= Shetland literature =

Shetland literature is literature written in Shetland, Scotland, or by writers from Shetland. The literature is often written in Shetland dialect or its parent language, Norn, and often depicts the history and folklore of Shetland. Common themes include reflections on island life and proximity to the sea, it is fishing and crofting traditions, the weather and seasons as determined by Shetland's climate, Shetland's unique landscape, its flora and fauna, and the influence of the people's Viking heritage. Folklore often displays features seen similarly in Scandinavia and some Celtic traditions.

== Norse literature ==
The earlier Norse language faded slowly, taking at least three hundred years to die out in certain isolated parts of Shetland such as Foula and Unst, as first Lowland Scots and then English became the language of power. The Norn language influences the variety of Lowland Scots spoken in Shetland today, in lexicon and grammar. This unique mix has come to be called either Shetland dialect, or simply "Shetland" by Shetlanders.

Little remains of the old Norse tongue, Norn, in script form, and what is extant (such as the ballad "Hildina", The "Unst Boat song" and various Norn fragments collected by Jakob Jakobsen) is often corrupted. These works have been studied in depth, and scholars have notionally fixed the old Shetland Norn as kin to Faroese and Vestnorsk. The oral tradition for which Shetland was famed in the Norse era (when it was known as a land of bards) died with the language, though it may well be that some of the old folktales and ballads were translated into the oral tradition now known in Shetland dialect, and that the continuing proliferation of writers in Shetland could be considered an ongoing form of that tradition of 'bards', even across the difficult cultural shift from Scandinavia to Britain.

Shetland is mentioned, however, in sources from the surrounding countries. For example, the Orkneyinga saga, mainly about Orkney talks about the archipelago on a number of occasions.

== British Period ==
In the British era, which properly began for Shetland with the Napoleonic Wars, Shetlanders developed a literature in variant written forms of the spoken Shetland dialect, as well as in English. The first widely published writers were two daughters of the Lerwick gentry, Dorothea Primrose Campbell and Margaret Chalmers, who wrote for the most part in a rather formal English. Subsequent Shetland dialect writers such as Haldane Burgess, James Stout Angus, George Stewart and Basil R Anderson helped forge the written form of the native tongue.

There are now a number of titles that might be termed Shetland dialect classics, in the sense that they found a ready market among Shetlanders when first published and became definitive of some part of the islands' culture. These works are not always the works of natives – incomers and visitors to Shetland have made considerable contributions to literature about Shetland, as in the cases of Jakob Jakobsen and Hugh MacDiarmid for instance. Much of this literature is currently out of print and has been, in some instances, for a very long time. As a result, subsequent generations of Shetlanders have grown up unaware of this tradition – and specialist readers, the scholars beyond the islands who might be interested, remain oblivious to the work.

== Modern writers ==
These include:

- Rhoda Bulter
- James W. Clarke
- Christine de Luca
- John J. Graham
- Lollie Graham
- Robert Alan Jamieson
- Laureen Johnson
- Jim Mainland
- John (Jack) Peterson
- Paul J. Ritch
- T. A. Robertson (Vagaland)
- Stella Sutherland
- Christian S. Tait
- William J. Tait
