= Haldane Burgess =

British author (1862 – 1927)

James John (J.J.) Haldane Burgess (28 May 1862 – 16 January 1927) was a Shetland historian, poet, novelist, violinist, linguist and socialist, a noted figure in Shetland's cultural history. His published works include Rasmie's Büddie, Some Shetland Folk, Tang, The Treasure of Don Andreas, Rasmie's Kit, Rasmie's Smaa Murr, and The Viking Path, the latter being translated into German. He was one of the Shetlanders who gave assistance to Jakob Jakobsen in his researches into the Norn language in Shetland.

== Early life ==
Burgess was born on 28 May 1862. He was a son of Lerwick, whose grandfather had left Dunrossness as a soldier during the Napoleonic period and lived in Edinburgh for a time before settling in 'da toon' as a shopkeeper.

Haldane Burgess won first place in the Glasgow Bursary Competition. He spent four years as a teacher in Bressay in order to pay for his university education. He studied divinity at the University of Edinburgh, but found himself in disagreement with certain doctrines. He lost his sight in his last year of study, took his final exams orally and returned to Lerwick. Later his promotion of socialist ideas made him a popular and radical figure. He was a major supporter of the development of the Shetland Festival Up Helly Aa. His 1894 book The Viking Path... was a major influence in creating the Viking theme of the Up Helly Aa festival. Burgess also wrote the Up Helly Aa Song (initially sung to the tune of 'John Brown's body') which is sung during the burning of the Viking longship and in village halls and schools in Shetland.

== Writings ==
He was a linguist and a champion of Esperanto. He developed a lifelong interest in Norse culture and taught himself Norwegian, later contributing articles to journals in Norway. In his lifetime he was best known for a novel entitled The Viking Path – A Tale of The White Christ (1894), set in Shetland and Norway at the coming of Christianity. The best-known of his work now is probably his verse in dialect, as published in Rasmie's Büddie: poems in the Shetlandic (1891), which was republished in 1913, and later in 1979 with illustrations by Frank Walterson. The poem 'Scranna' is one of the acknowledged classics of Shetland literature.

Laurence I. Graham, in his essay "Shetland Literature and the idea of community" in Shetland’s Northern Links: Language and History (1996), writes that his novel Tang "... was written in the closing years of the last century. It tells the story of a young girl, Inga, and her divided love for two men: one, her devoted admirer, a steady, hard working fisherman, and the other, a newly arrived minister, young, idealistic, unsure of himself and very susceptible to feminine charm and persuasion. It also presents a picture of a small community of crofter-fishermen, their women-folk, the merchant, the teacher, the minister and the laird. Burgess brings out the darker side of this community, the hypocrisy and occasional dishonesty, the servility of some crofters towards the gentry, the malicious gossip, the petty jealousies and spitefulness within the congregation and the damage done by itinerant hot-gospellers and their infernal, illegitimate-producing revival meetings' as Hakki, the agnostic schoolmaster, calls them. The novel certainly gives an unflattering picture of what passed for religious life at this period ... The arguments between Hakki, the outspoken agnostic, and the minister and laird are among the highlights of the book and it is obvious where the author's sympathies lie. It is certainly an unusual novel for its time when the Scottish Kailyard school of writing was still at its height ..."

== Personal ==
A street in Lerwick, Haldane Burgess Crescent, is named after him. His younger brother William A. S. Burgess was also an author.
