= Stella Sutherland =

Stella Sutherland (7 October 1924 – 15 October 2015) was one of the Shetland writers of the later 20th and early 21st century. Best known for poetry in both English and Shetland dialect, she also contributed articles and short stories to local magazines, especially The New Shetlander.

== Biography ==
Sutherland was born in Bressay in 1924. Her early years were spent in Sandwick, on the Shetland mainland, her teenage years in the island of Foula. As a young woman she worked in Lerwick, before her marriage in 1949 to Bressay farmer Laurence Sutherland. She died in Lerwick on 15 October 2015.

== Publications ==
Sutherland was an early contributor to The New Shetlander, and many of her articles, stories, and uncollected poems can be found in the pages of that magazine, and in the later monthly Shetland Life.

Poems by her appear in several anthologies: Nordern Lights (1964, Zetland County Council Education Committee); John and Laurence Graham's A Shetland Anthology (1998).; Swedish poet Håkon Anderson's Landskapets lycka: Vandringar och poesi i brittiska landskap (2005).; Bright pebbles (2010, Shetland Islands Council); These islands, we sing (2011, Polygon).

Published collections are:

Aa my Selves (1980, Shetland Times)

A Celebration and other poems (1991, the author)

Joy o creation (2008, Hansel Cooperative Press) (reviewed here, and the source of a 'Poem of the Week' in the Scotsman).

The Yule 2012 issue of The New Shetlander featured a CD celebrating "the work of one of Shetland’s best poets: a compilation of poems and stories, on archive tracks and new recordings, read by Stella and friends." Other audio clips can be found on the websites of the Shetland Library and Shetland ForWirds.
