= James Stout Angus =

Scottish writer (1830-1923)

James Stout Angus (20 September 1830 – 26 December 1923) was a writer from Shetland, Scotland.

== Life ==
Angus was born at Catfirth Haa in the parish of Nesting. His grandfather William Angus is recorded first at Burraness in Delting, but the lands of Catfirth were leased in 1782 to the Angus family who retained them until 1890. His son Hercules (1791–1871) married Janet Stout of Scatsta. He was a merchant at Catfirth and it was here that the writer grew up. James had some tuition from Robert Laing, schoolmaster, land surveyor and teacher of navigation, and he assisted his schoolmaster uncle in Reawick for a time, but he subsequently bound himself as a housewright or joiner, then worked as a ship's carpenter, sailing emigrant and East Indian ships. He settled in Lerwick when he married, establishing a successful business as a housewright at No. 6 Commercial Street.

Angus began to publish poetry in the press in the 1870s, and is credited by Laurence Graham as having composed, in ‘Eels’ (1877), the "first truly original poem written in what we know as the Shetland dialect". In 1910, aged 80, having been inspired by the work of the Faeroese philologist Jakob Jakobsen, he published his Etymological Glossary of Some Shetland Placenames, and four years later his Glossary of the Shetland Dialect. He lived to be 93, by which time his poetry had been collected in Echoes in Klingrahool, subsequently reprinted twice.

" … Messrs. T and J Manson, Lerwick, have sent out a third edition (3s.) of Mr. James Stout Angus's book of poems, mostly in the Shetland dialect, Echoes from Klingrahool. It adds some new pieces to the former editions which have already endeared themselves to Shetlanders at home and abroad, and which recommend it more than ever to the favour of students of a vernacular inexhaustible in the variety of tender touches it can impart to a northern mother tongue .. " The Scotsman, 9 May 1927

" … Angus was a very gifted man, a natural, who never received any real linguistic or literary training, but worked as an artisan all his life … His poetry is gentle, lightsome and he is generally regarded as the most masterful writer of the Shetland dialect …" Laurits Rendboe, The Shetland Literary Tradition, (1980)

" … Angus … used the language of an older age, Whether he spoke it naturally or not we do not know, but without question, he wrote it naturally, with no sense of strain, but giving the impression throughout of a deep and solemn knowledge that the old tongue was, as it were, a sacred thing …" William Sandison, Shetland Verse: Remnants of the Norn, (1953)

== See also ==
Articles by Laurence I. Graham in The New Shetlander 15; Karen Eunson in The New Shetlander 203
