= Shetland Folk Society =

The Shetland Folk Society was created in 1945 as a heritage group, to gather, record and support all aspects of Shetland's cultural history. The first president was T. A. Robertson (Vagaland), who served until his death in 1973, after which John J. Graham took on the role. Current president is Douglas Sinclair.

The Shetland Folk Society has been responsible for many key initiatives and publications, including regular volumes of The Shetland Folk Book (see below), Da Sangs At A'll Sing ta dee: a book of Shetland songs (Robertson & Robertson, 1973), Da Mirrie Dancers: A Book of Shetland Fiddle Tunes (Tom Anderson & Tom Georgeson, 1970), the 1985 reprint of Jakob Jakobsen's dictionary and Bertie Deyell's collection of Shetland Proverbs and Sayings (1993).

Shetland Folk Book:

- Vol. 1 - 1947, ed. E. S. Reid Tait;
- Vol. 2 - 1951;
- Vol. 3 - 1957, ed. T.A. Robertson;
- Vol. 4 - 1964;
- Vol. 5 - 1971;
- Vol. 6 - 1976, ed. John J. Graham;
- Vol. 7 - 1980, ed. John J. Graham;
- Vol. 8 - 1988, ed. John J. Graham;
- Vol. 9 - 1995, ed. John J. Graham
