= Hildina =

Tradition Orkney ballad in the Norn language

"Hildina" is a traditional ballad thought to have been composed in Orkney in the 17th century, but collected on the island of Foula in Shetland in 1774, and first published in 1805. It tells a story of love, bloodshed and revenge among characters from the ruling families of Orkney and Norway. This ballad is written in Norn, the extinct North Germanic language once spoken in Orkney and Shetland, and is the only surviving work of any length in that language. It is one of two Norn ballads included in The Types of the Scandinavian Medieval Ballad, where it is classified as type E 97. (Note: The other being the jocular ballad "Den huslige bondemand" (TSB F 33, Danish title, no Norn title given), printed in Knut Liestøl's Saga og folkeminne, and by Rendboe as "The Henpecked Farmer".)

== Synopsis ==
As the ballad opens the earl of Orkney makes off with Hildina, the daughter of the king of Norway, an act which the king vows to avenge. The king's daughter pledges her love to the earl and urges him to make peace with her father. This he attempts, offering the king a dowry, but his rival Hiluge offers a greater one. Hildina prophecies that someone will die if matters are not made up, and this indeed happens when Hiluge and the earl of Orkney fight a duel. The earl is killed, and Hiluge throws his rival's head into Hildina's lap. The king now agrees to allow Hiluge to marry his daughter, though warning that the match is ill-omened. At the wedding-feast Hildina drugs the wine, and when all but her are insensible she drags her father and the wedding-guests out of the hall. Finally she sets light to the hall, and, as Hiluge burns to death, tells him that he will never again harm one of the king's children.

== Discovery ==
In 1774 George Low, a young Scottish clergyman, visited the small and remote island of Foula in Shetland hoping to find remnants of oral literature in Norn, a language then nearing extinction. He found there fragments of songs, ballads and romances, and from his best source, an old farmer called William Henry, the ballad now known as "Hildina". Low had no knowledge of the language himself, and even Henry was quite poorly acquainted with it, so that although he had as a child memorised all 35 stanzas of the ballad in the original Norn he could give Low only a summary of its content rather than a translation. In 1893, when the Faroese philologist Jakob Jakobsen visited Shetland, he found that, though further fragments of folk poetry could still be collected, all memory of the ballad had been lost.

== Publication ==
Low's manuscript account of his expedition, "A Tour Through the Islands of Orkney and Schetland [sic]", included not only "Hildina", which he called "The Earl of Orkney and the King of Norway's Daughter: a Ballad", but also a translation into Norn of the Lord's Prayer and a list of 34 common words. The ballad was first published from Low's transcript by the Rev. George Barry in his History of the Orkney Islands (Edinburgh, 1805), then by Peter Andreas Munch in Samlinger til det Norske Folks Sprog og Historie ('Collections of the Norwegian People's Language and History') (Christiania, 1838). Low's book was eventually published in Kirkwall in 1879. Finally, a scholarly edition of "Hildina" by the Norwegian linguist Marius Hægstad under the title Hildinakvadet med utgreiding um det norske maal paa Shetland i eldre tid ('Hildina's poem with an explanation of the Norwegian language on Shetland in ancient times') appeared in 1900. Hægstad reconstructed from Low's inevitably garbled transcript a version of what Henry might actually have recited. No English translation of this study has ever appeared.

== Language ==
The literary historian Nora Kershaw Chadwick called the language of "Hildina" "so obscure...as to be almost untranslatable", partly because there are so few other examples of Norn, and partly because of the difficulties produced by George Low's total and William Henry's partial ignorance of the poem's meaning. The language is certainly a branch of Norse, most closely related to its south-west Norwegian and Faroese varieties. It exhibits a few loanwords from Danish, Faroese, Frisian and Scots, but not from Gaelic. The grammar of "Hildina"'s Norn is fundamentally that of Old Norse, though with reduced morphological complexity. Stanza 22 illustrates the similarities and differences:

George Low's text	Marius Hægstad's corrected version	Old Norse translation	English translation
Nu fac an Jarlin dahuge Dar min de an engine gro An east ans huge ei Fong ednar u vaxhedne more neo.	Nu fac an Iarlin dahuge – dar minde an engin gro –. An cast ans huge ei fong ednar, u vaks hedne mere meo.	Nú fekk hann jarlinn dauðahøggit – þar myndi hann engan grœða –. Hann kastaði hans hǫfði í fang hennar, ok óx henni meiri móðr.	Now the Earl received a deadly cut, no one there could heal him Hiluge threw his head into Hildina's lap; thus added to her grief.

== Sources and analogues ==
The first half of the story of Hildina, until the appearance of Hiluge, is believed to derive from the legend of Hjaðningavíg, which relates among other things the abduction of the valkyrie Hildr by a prince named Heðinn, and their pursuit by Hildr's father Hǫgni. This legend is attested in sources from across the Teutonic world, notably Snorri Sturluson's "Skáldskaparmál", the Icelandic "Sörla þáttr", the Gesta Danorum of Saxo Grammaticus, and the Middle High German poem Kudrun. It must also have been known in Orkney, since it is referred to in a poem called "Háttalykill inn forni" which the Orkneyinga saga attributes to Jarl Rögnvald of Orkney and the Icelander Hallr Þórarinsson.

The second half of the ballad bears no relation to any form of the Hjaðningavíg story, except possibly the later chapters of Kudrun. Parallels to the wedding of Hildina and Hiluge have been found in the Icelandic poem "Guðrúnarkviða II", in which the heroine Gudrun is urged to marry king Atli, the murderer of her lover Sigurd. There are further echoes of Hiluge's death by fire when Atli dreams of his own death at Gudrun's hands, a dream which Gudrun re-interprets and proposes to fulfill:

He asked me to interpret an ill-prophecy:
"Just now the Norns awoke me;
I imagined, Gudrun, Gjuki's daughter,
That you pierced my heart with a poisoned sword."

"A dream of metal, that means fire,
Of a maid's anger, that means pride:
To ban evil I will burn you with fire
For your comfort and health, though hateful to me."

Throughout "Hildina" there appear plot-elements which have been identified as Celtic. These include the motif of "hurling the head", which is also found in the Irish stories Bricriu's Feast and Mac Da Thó's Pig, and the "king and goddess" theme, found also in the Galatian story of Camma, Sinatus and Sinorix (recorded by Plutarch) and in the Irish saga Baile in Scáil. Distant parallels with the mabinogi of Branwen have also been claimed.

== English translations ==
- Collingwood, W. G. (1908). "The Ballad of Hildina". Orkney and Shetland Miscellany of the Viking Club. 1: 211–216.
- Kershaw, N. (1921). Stories and Ballads of the Far Past. Cambridge: Cambridge University Press. pp. 217–219. First twelve stanzas only.
- Lockwood, W. B. (1975). Languages of the British Isles Past and Present. London: Andre Deutsch. p. 216. ISBN 0233966668. First four stanzas only.
- Barnes, Michael (1984). "Orkney and Shetland Norn". In Trudgill, Peter (ed.). Language in the British Isles. Cambridge: Cambridge University Press. p. 356. ISBN 0521284090. Stanzas 22 and 23 only.
- Barnes, Michael P. (1998). The Norn Language of Orkney and Shetland. Lerwick: Shetland Times. p. 46. ISBN 1898852294. Stanzas 1–4, 20–23 only.
- Graham, John J.; Graham, Laurence I., eds. (1998). A Shetland Anthology: Poetry from Earliest Times to the Present Day. Lerwick: Shetland Publishing. pp. 1–11. ISBN 0906736196.
- Anonymous (2006–2014). "The Ballad of Hildina (Foula)". Norn. Hnolt.
- Fischer, Frances J. (2007). "'Hildina'—A Norn Ballad in Shetland". Scottish Studies. 35. University of Edinburgh: 211–216.
