= Shetland Library =

Public library service in Scotland

- 60°09′14″N 1°08′49″W
- Location: Shetland Library, Lower Hillhead, Lerwick, Shetland, ZE1 0EL, Scotland
- Established: 1918

Other information
- Website: http://www.shetland-library.gov.uk

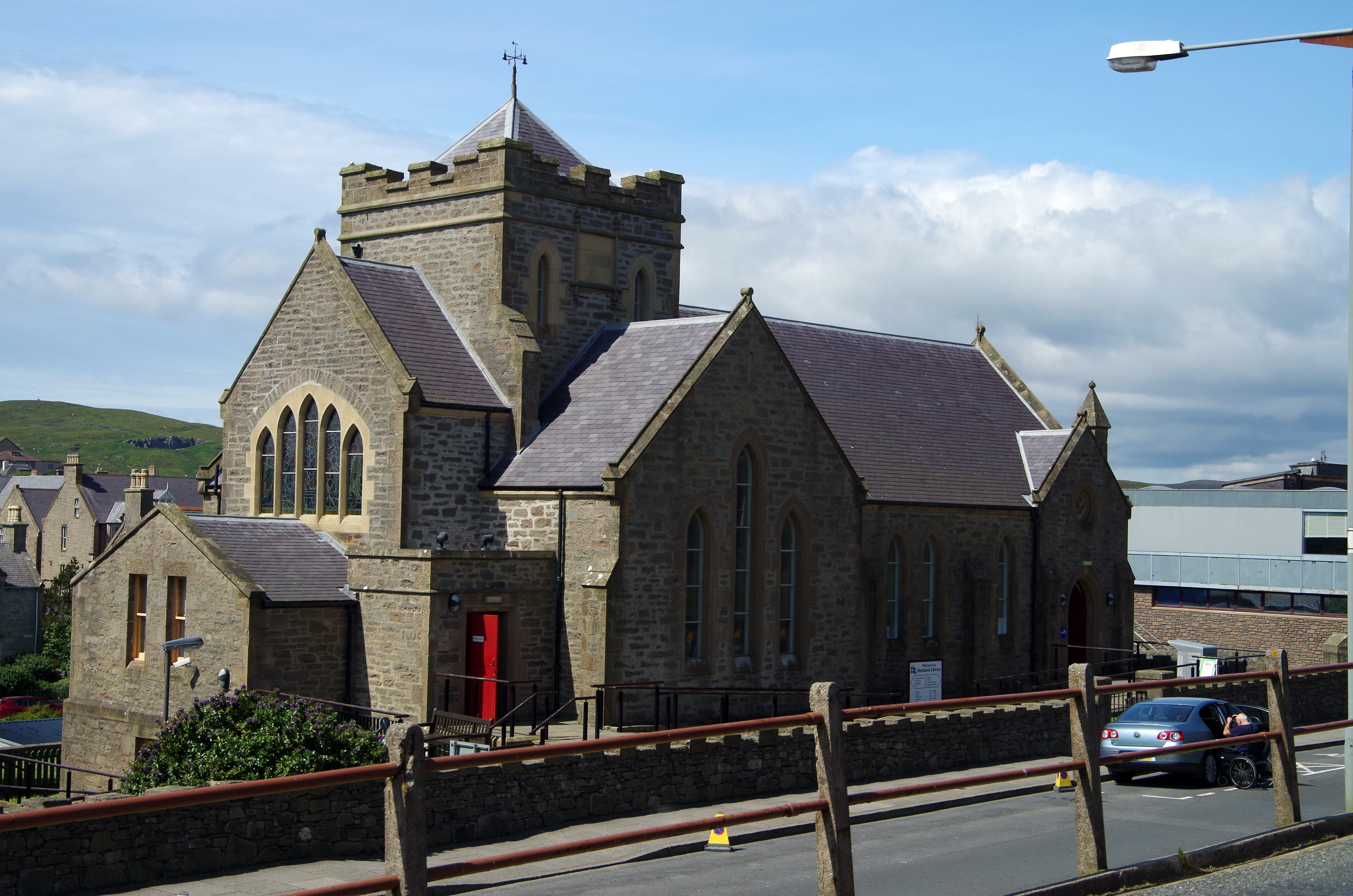
Shetland Library occupied the former St Ringan's Church

Shetland Library is the public library service of Shetland, with its main branch based in Lerwick. Membership is open to both residents of and visitors to the islands. The library has a range of digital, online and physical material and collections that support the literary traditions of the Northern Isles.

Aside from the main branch, the service also provides seven school libraries, two of which (in Baltasound and Mid Yell) are community libraries open to the public, and a mobile library. The Shetland Library service is provided by the Shetland Islands Council (SIC).

== History ==
Shetland Library was established in 1916, two years before Scottish county libraries were constituted by law in 1918 and was part of a pilot scheme financed by Carnegie United Kingdom Trust to promote wider access to library privileges.

Having resided in ‘temporary’ accommodation from 1948 onwards which no longer provided adequate space for their expanding collections, the decision to relocate was taken. On 29 June 1966 the new library and museum building was opened on Lower Hillhead by the Lord Lieutenant R. H. W. Bruce. The building was shared with Shetland Museum and Archive, and was built in 1966 by Zetland County Council.

The library relocated in 2002 to the former St Ringan's Church on Lower Hillhead in Lerwick. This United Free Church's congregation had been dwindling throughout the 1970s and 1980s and there had been considerable thought given to what use the B-listed building could be put to. In fact, in the early 1980s the congregation of St Ringan's had proposed selling the building to Shetland Islands Council (SIC) for the purpose of turning it into a library. Plans were drawn up but the project came to nothing. The building was still sold to the SIC – for the price of £1.00 – and after some renovations which were overseen by Historic Environment Scotland, St Ringan's became a library after all. The church was renovated to include a mezzanine floor and rolling shelving. St Ringan's United Free Church is a B-listed, Gothic grey sandstone building with a squat crenellated central tower; it was built by R. G. Sykes of Liverpool in 1885–86.

Since the 2002 move, the old library building on Lower Hillhead had been used partially as a library store as well as housing council services such as adult learning and social services. In 2005 plans were approved to renovate this building and bring it back into more active use. Members of the public were invited to open days in 2016 to offer their opinions on what could be done to make the building useful to the community. Due to rising projected costs, this renovation plan was stalled.

In December 2021 the library moved back to the old library building which had been refurbished. The top floor of the building had housed the Shetland Museum for many years until the new museum building opened in 2007.

== Collections ==
The Shetland Library houses adult, young adult and children's fiction and non-fiction, eAudio, eBooks, eMagazines, online reference resources, large print material, reference material, DVDs and videos, talking books and music and their Shetland Collection.

=== Shetland collections ===
In aid of promoting local literary traditions Shetland Library seeks to collect as many books published in or about Shetland as possible. The library also supplements this by publishing material on Shetland themselves, from local history to poetry. Local authors published include Christine De Luca and Lollie Graham,

The Shetland Collection also includes Shetland periodicals, pamphlets and maps and microfilm of The Shetland Times and The Shetland News among other newspapers which go back into the 19th century.

== Services and community outreach ==
Shetland Library takes part in the Scottish Government's book-gifting programme for under fives, Bookbug.

The main branch in Lerwick runs book groups and there is a regular series of events including author talks and book launches (many of which tie into the Library's Shetland Collection) as well as behind the scenes ‘Basement Browsing’ and practical ICT help. In 2016, the library received a 3D printer due to a Scottish Library and Information Council (SLIC) initiative which was funded by the Scottish Government.

The Shetland Library hosts a local writers’ showcase which features writing in the Shetland dialect. It works with Shetland ForWirds, an organisation which promotes the use of the Shetland dialect and, aside from having a range of material on the dialect for both adults and children, it also offers a dialect writing prize in its annual Young Writer competition.

Mobile and housebound services are provided by a van, which travels around Shetland, including the islands of Yell, Unst, Whalsay, Trondra, Burra and Muckle Roe.

== Twitter presence ==
Shetland Library enjoys a good-natured Twitter rivalry with Orkney Library.
