= Christine De Luca =

Scottish poet (born 1947)

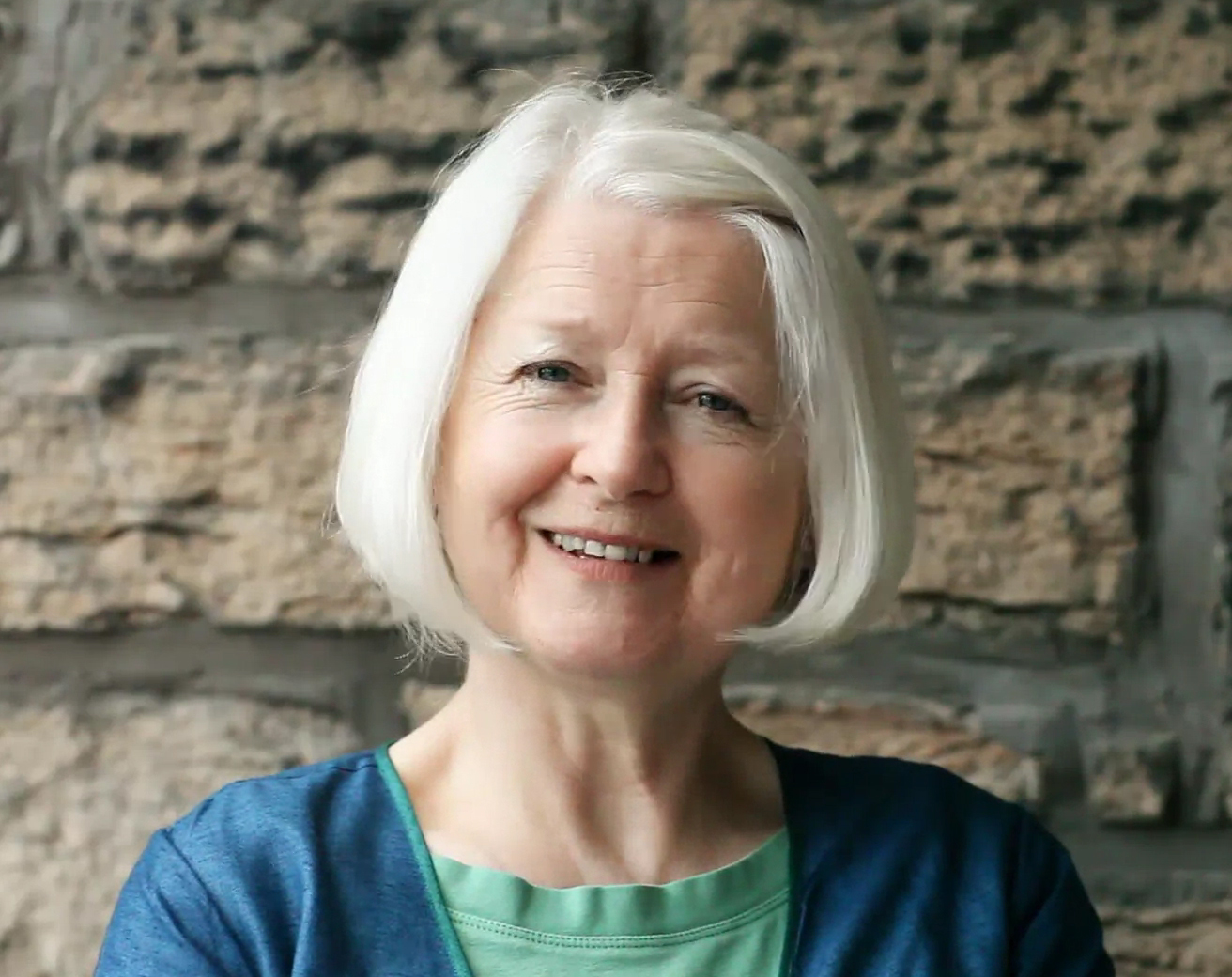
- De Luca in 2014
- Born: Christine Pearson; 4 April 1947 (age 79); Bressay, Shetland, Scotland
- Education: University of Edinburgh
- Occupations: Poet, writer
- Writing career
- Language: English, Shetland dialect
- Notable work: Dat Trickster Sun
- Notable awards: Appointed Edinburgh's Makar (2014—2017)
- Website: De Luca's website

Christine De Luca (née Pearson; born 4 April 1947) is a Scottish poet and writer from Shetland, who writes in both English and Shetland dialect. (Note: De Luca frequently refers to Shetland dialect as Shetlandic, however, this term is considered controversial and is commonly disliked by native speakers.) From 2014 to 2017, she was Edinburgh Makar (Poet Laureate for the City of Edinburgh). Several of her collections have won awards or have been short-listed for awards. She is widely translated and has been involved in numerous translation activities. She is also an active collaborator with musicians and visual artists; and has been one of the Shore Poets for over 30 years, a group of poets who organise monthly poetry/music events in Edinburgh.

== Early life and education ==
De Luca was born Christine Pearson in Walls, Shetland and grew up in Walls. Her father, Sandy Pearson, was the headmaster of Happyhansel Junior Secondary School in Shetland. De Luca moved to Edinburgh in her late teens to study at University of Edinburgh. After graduation, she taught high school for several years and later obtained a master's degree in Educational Research in 1980.

== Writing career ==
De Luca's first three poetry collections were published by the Shetland Library. Her first collection, Voes and Sounds was published in 1994 and her second work, Wast Wi Da Valkyries, was published in 1997. Both collections won the Shetland Literary Prize. A third collection, 'Plain Song', was published in Shetland and Edinburgh in 2002.

In 2004, De Luca's pamphlet, Drops in Time's Ocean, was published by Hansel Co-operative Press. It is based on eight generations of De Luca's family's history. Her poetry collection, Parallel Worlds (Luath Press) was published in 2005. A bi-lingual volume of Du Luca's poetry was published in 2007 by éditions fédérop; Parallel Worlds (Mondes Parallèles), Poems Translated from English and Shetlandic, include De Luca's first four volumes of poetry and recent work, and was translated by Jean-Paul Blot and De Luca. Mondes Parallèles, published was awarded the Poetry Prize at the Salon International du Livre Insulaire in Brittany in 2007.

In 2007, the collection won the poetry prize at the 9th Salon International du Livre Insulaire in Ouessant.

De Luca's sixth poetry collection, North End of Eden was published by Luath Press in 2010. In 2011, De Luca's novel, And Then Forever, was published by the Shetland Times. Her pamphlet, Dat Trickster Sun, (Mariscat Press 2014), was short-listed for the Michael Marks Awards for Poetry Pamphlets award in 2014. This was translated into Italian by Francesca Romana Paci in 2015 (Questo sole furfante) and published by Trauben, Torino.

De Luca was appointed Edinburgh's Makar (poet laureate) in 2014. She served as poet laureate from 2014 to 2017. Her poems have been chosen four times (2006, 2010, 2013 and 2015), by the Scottish Poetry Library for its annual 20 Best Scottish Poems list. De Luca's work has been translated into several languages, including French, Italian, Swedish, Norwegian, Danish, Icelandic, Finnish, Estonian, Latvian, Polish, and Welsh.

== Northern Isles advocacy ==
De Luca speaking about the Shetland dialect.

De Luca is an advocate for the Shetland dialect, travelling internationally to share her native dialect with similar linguistic cultures, like Scandinavia and Iceland. De Luca is a co-founder of Hansel Co-operative Press, a non-profit cooperative, which promotes literary and artistic work in Shetland and Orkney.

De Luca has focused on promoting her native language through work with Shetland children. She has written children's stories in the Shetland dialect. De Luca translated Roald Dahl’s George’s Marvellous Medicine into Shetland dialect as Dodie’s Phenomenal Pheesic (Hansel Cooperative Press, 2008). Also published in 2016 by Black and White Publishing are two Julia Donaldson books, translated by De Luca: Da Trow (The Troll) and The Shetland Gruffalo's Bairn, (The Gruffalo's Child).

== Theatre ==
De Luca read the role of Elspa, Symon's wife, in The Merchants o Renoun presentation of Allan Ramsay's The Gentle Shepherd staged at the Netherbow Theatre, Edinburgh, on Thursday 26th and Saturday 28 November 1998.

== Selected publications ==
=== Poetry Collections ===
- 1997, Wast Wi Da Valkyries, The Shetland Library, poetry collection
- 1994, Voes and Sounds, The Shetland Library, poetry collection
- 2002, Plain Song, The Shetland Library, poetry collection
- 2004, Drop's in Time's Ocean, Hansel Cooperative Press, pamphlet
- 2005, Parallel Worlds, Luath Press, poetry collection
- 2010, North End of Eden, Luath Press, poetry collection
- 2014, Dat Trickster Sun, Mariscat Press, pamphlet
- 2017, Edinburgh Singing the City, Saltire Society, poetry collection
- 2021, Veeve, Mariscat Press, poetry collection
- 2021, The Art of Poetry & Other Poems, Hansel Cooperative Press, Selected poems by Eugénio de Andrade (Portuguese) with versions in English (A Levitin) and Shetlandic
- 2025, Vod – Abandoned Crofthouses in Shetland, forthcoming from The Shetland Times, Lerwick, Shetland (with photographs)

=== Collaborations as poet ===
- 2013 Havera – The story of an island (with J Laughton Johnston, Mark Sinclair and Pauleen Wiseman), Shetland Amenity Trust, Lerwick
- 2018 Paolozzi at Large in Edinburgh – Artworks and Creative Responses (with Carlo Pirozzo), Luath Press Ltd, Edinburgh
- 2022, Another Time, Another Place, The Scottish Gallery, 12 paintings by Victoria Crowe, with 12 poems
- 2025 Something of the Marvellous – with artist Brigid Collins – forthcoming from Luath Press, Edinburgh

=== Bilingual volumes of poetry ===
- 2007, Mondes Parallèles Translated from English and Shetlandic by Jean-Paul Blot, éditions fédérop, poetry collection
- 2015, Questo sole furfante (with Francesca Romana Paci), Nuova Trauben, Turin, Italy – translated collection
- 2017, Glimt av opphav/ Glims o Origin, Ura Forlag, Selected bilingual, Shetlandic with Norwegian versions by Odd Goksøyr
- 2017, Heimferðir/ Haemfarins, Dimma, Selected bilingual, (mainly) Shetlandic with Icelandic versions by Aðalsteinn Ásberg Sigurðsson
- 2020, Northern Alchemy, Patrician Press, Selected bilingual, Shetlandic with English versions
- 2022, Tutto è Percezione, (with Francesco Romana Paci and artist Victoria Crowe), Ludo Edizioni, Italy
- 2024, Whit ails, whit heals – Ce qui afflige, ce qui apaise (with Jean-Yves Le Disez), Francis Boutle Publishers, London – New & Selected

=== Fiction ===
- 2011, And Then Forever, The Shetland Times, novel
- 2022, The Trials of Mary Johnsdaughter, Luath Press Ltd, Edinburgh

=== Children’s storybook ===
- 2005, Smootie comes ta Lerrick, Hansel Co-operative Press, Orkney
- 2010, Smootie an da Toon Hall Clock, Hansel Co-operative Press, Orkney
- 2021, Grotti-Buckie an Tirli-Wirli, The Shetland Times Ltd, Shetland

=== Translations of storybooks for children ===
- 2008, Dodie’s Phenomenal Pheesic, Hansel Co-operative Press, Orkney
- 2016, Da Trow, Itchy Coo with Black & White Publishing Ltd, Edinburgh
- 2016, The Shetland Gruffalo’s Bairn, Itchy Coo with Black & White Publishing Ltd, Edinburgh
- 2022, Da Peerie Prince, Edition Tintenfass, Germany

== Awards and recognition ==
- 2014, appointed Edinburgh's Makar, (2014—2017)
- 2014, shortlisted for Michael Marks Awards for Poetry Pamphlets, for Dat Trickster Sun
- 2007, International Book Fair in Ouessant, poetry prize, for Parallel Worlds, poems translated from English and Shetlandic
- 1999, Shetland Literary Prize for Wast Wi Da Valkyries
- 1996, Shetland Literary Prize, for Voce and Sounds
