= Pamphlet (poetry) =

Small, printed poetry collection

A chapbook of Robert Burns's The Whistle: A Poem

A pamphlet or chapbook is a small collection of poetry, usually 15 to 30 poems, centering around one theme. Poets often publish a pamphlet as their first work. Pamphlets are not usually more than 40 pages. They are sometimes handmade or saddle-stitched, a format best suited for small print runs. Compared to a full-length poetry collection, a pamphlet is fairly inexpensive to produce. Some poets design and print their own pamphlets.

The poetry pamphlet has always been a good way for new poets to reach an audience. Many of today's well-known poets were first published in pamphlet form – or have at different times in their career enjoyed the delicacy and artistry of a small pamphlet. They are the connoisseur's version of a very tasty starter. Straight away, they give you a sense of somebody, an idea of their voice, just enough to make you know that you'd like more – or not.

— Jackie Kay, Edinburgh poet laureate

In the United States, a poetry pamphlet is called a chapbook. Since 2003, the Poetry Society of America offers an annual chapbook fellowship. Beginning in 2009 in Britain, the Poetry Book Society partnered with the British Library, to establish the Michael Marks Awards for Poetry Pamphlets.

== See also ==
- Pamphlet
- Chapbook
