= Vagaland =

Scottish poet (1909–1973)

Vagaland (6 March 1909 – 30 December 1973) was a poet from Shetland.

== Biography ==
Vagaland was born Thomas Alexander Robertson in Westerwick at the southern tip of the parish of Sandsting, his mother's home. He was the second son of Andrina Johnston and Thomas Robertson of Skeld, a merchant seaman. His father drowned before his first birthday, and his mother moved with her two sons to Stove in Waas.

He grew up in hardship. A shy boy who adjusted with difficulty to the rough and tumble environment of school, he was nonetheless able to excel at both physical and intellectual pursuits. He took his MA at the University of Edinburgh and was offered the possibility of postgraduate work at Oxford, which he turned down for financial reasons, instead becoming a teacher at the Lerwick Central School and carer to his ailing mother.

He adopted the old Norse name for the Westerwick area as his pen name.

In 1953, he married Martha (‘Pat’), daughter of the Reverend Robert Andrew, Church of Scotland minister in Walls. Pat was a girl he had known in childhood. She became his colleague and collaborator on many fronts, and together they edited Da Sangs at A’ll sing ta Dee (The Songs that I'll sing to you), a collection of dialect songs and music (1973). One of his own lyric poems, Da Sang o da Papa Men, written from the perspective of the Papa Stour fishermen 'rowin Foula doon', has become a favourite Shetland song, to music composed by T. M. Y. Manson.

In 1945, Vagaland was instrumental in the founding of the Shetland Folk Society and he was an office-bearer from its inception until his death after a long illness, in Lerwick on 30 December 1973. He was one of the writers who helped to establish The New Shetlander in 1947, and he was a key supporter of the journal for 27 years till his death. Each issue included at least one poem by Vagaland. With John J. Graham, he co-wrote Grammar and Usage of the Shetland Dialect (1952); co-edited the influential anthology of Shetland verse and prose, Nordern Lights (1964), both crucially important publications, and a number of volumes of The Shetland Folk Book.

" … His constant passion for maintaining the continuity of local tradition … was no mere antiquarian indulgence. It was fired by a real conviction, founded on personal experience, that the past revealed true insights into the art of living; that out of the lives of ordinary folk, engaged in their daily tasks and sustained by the warmth of close communities, there emerged basic truths about the human situation. And his poems were evocations of that life and affirmations of those truths … " John J. Graham, The New Shetlander

" … His poetry is simple and direct and often has the quality of the historical ballad … he had a natural gift for expressing himself in a lyrical poetry that also reveals his attitude to life and people …" Liv K. Schei, The Shetland Story, (London, 1988)

"A poet of the countryside, like Wordsworth or Clare ... ... the timeless Shetland before the twentieth century overwhelmed it ..." The Orcadian

== Bibliography ==
- Laeves fae Vagaland, Lerwick, 1952
- Maer Laeves fae Vagaland, Lerwick,1965
- Grammar and Usage of the Shetland Dialect with John J. Graham, Lerwick, 1952
- The Collected Poems of Vagaland, edited by M. Robertson and introduced by Ernest Marwick, The Shetland Times, Lerwick 1975, 1980

== Sources ==
- The original text of this article was from http://shetlopedia.com/Vagaland a GFDL wiki.
