= Shetland Museum =

Scottish museum

Shetland Museum and Archives
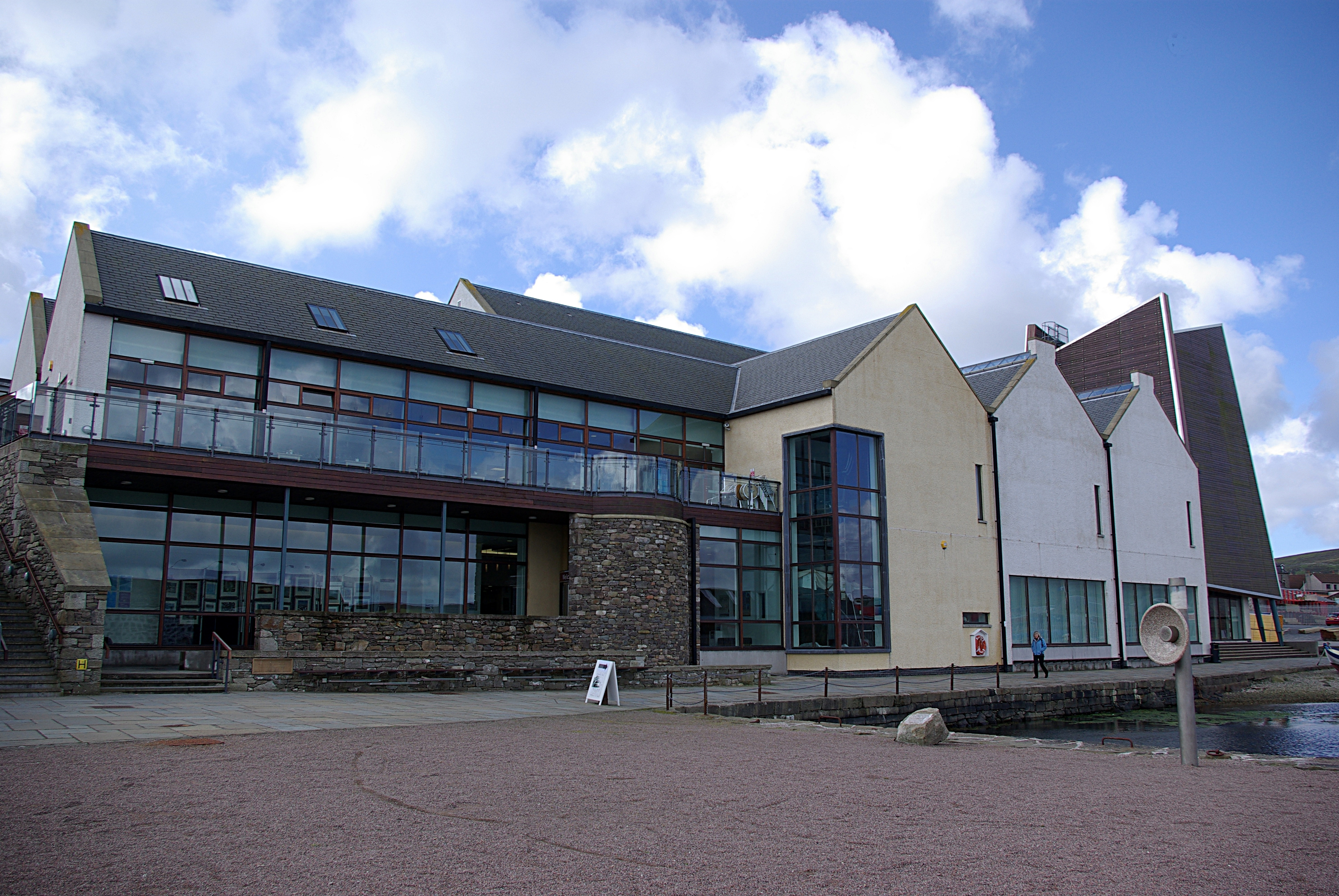
- The Shetland Museum's frontage
- Interactive map of the Shetland Museum and Archives area

General information
- Location: Hay's Dock; Lerwick; Shetland; ZE1 0WP; Scotland
- Coordinates: 60°09′28″N 1°09′00″W
- Construction started: 2004
- Inaugurated: 31 May 2007
- Cost: ~£11.6 million
- Owner: Shetland Islands Council

Technical details
- Floor count: 2

Design and construction
- Architect: Building Design Partnership
- Main contractor: DITT Construction Ltd

Website
- www.shetlandmuseumandarchives.org.uk

The Shetland Museum and Archives is a museum in Lerwick, Shetland, Scotland. The current building at Hay's Dock was officially opened on 31 May 2007 by Charles III & Camilla (then the Duke & Duchess of Rothesay) and Queen Sonja of Norway.

== Previous building ==
On 29 June 1966, a library and museum building was opened on Lower Hillhead and King Harald Street, Lerwick by the Lord Lieutenant R.H.W. Bruce. The building was built in 1966 by Zetland County Council and was shared with Shetland Library.

== New building ==
The new building, which cost in the region of £11.6 million, was part-funded by a Heritage Lottery Fund grant of £4.9 million, and replaced the much smaller buildings in Lerwick. The lead consultant for the development was the Building Design Partnership, and the main contractor D.I.T.T. Construction Ltd. started work on the building in 2004. The display designs in the building were created by GBDM of Dundee in collaboration with museum staff. The completed building is a massive step forward for the Shetland Museum with five times the space for exhibits, not including the three-storey boat hall. The building also contains a state-of-the-art archive-storage facility and search room – again with increased space and much better facilities. There is also a 120-seat lecture hall, temporary display areas, and a cafe, which serves, as much as possible, local produce.

In April 2008, the Museum and Archives was nominated for the Art Prize Fund for museums & galleries. The building won the "Commercial & Public Access" award and the overall "Gold Award" in the 2008 Wood Awards.

== Galleries ==
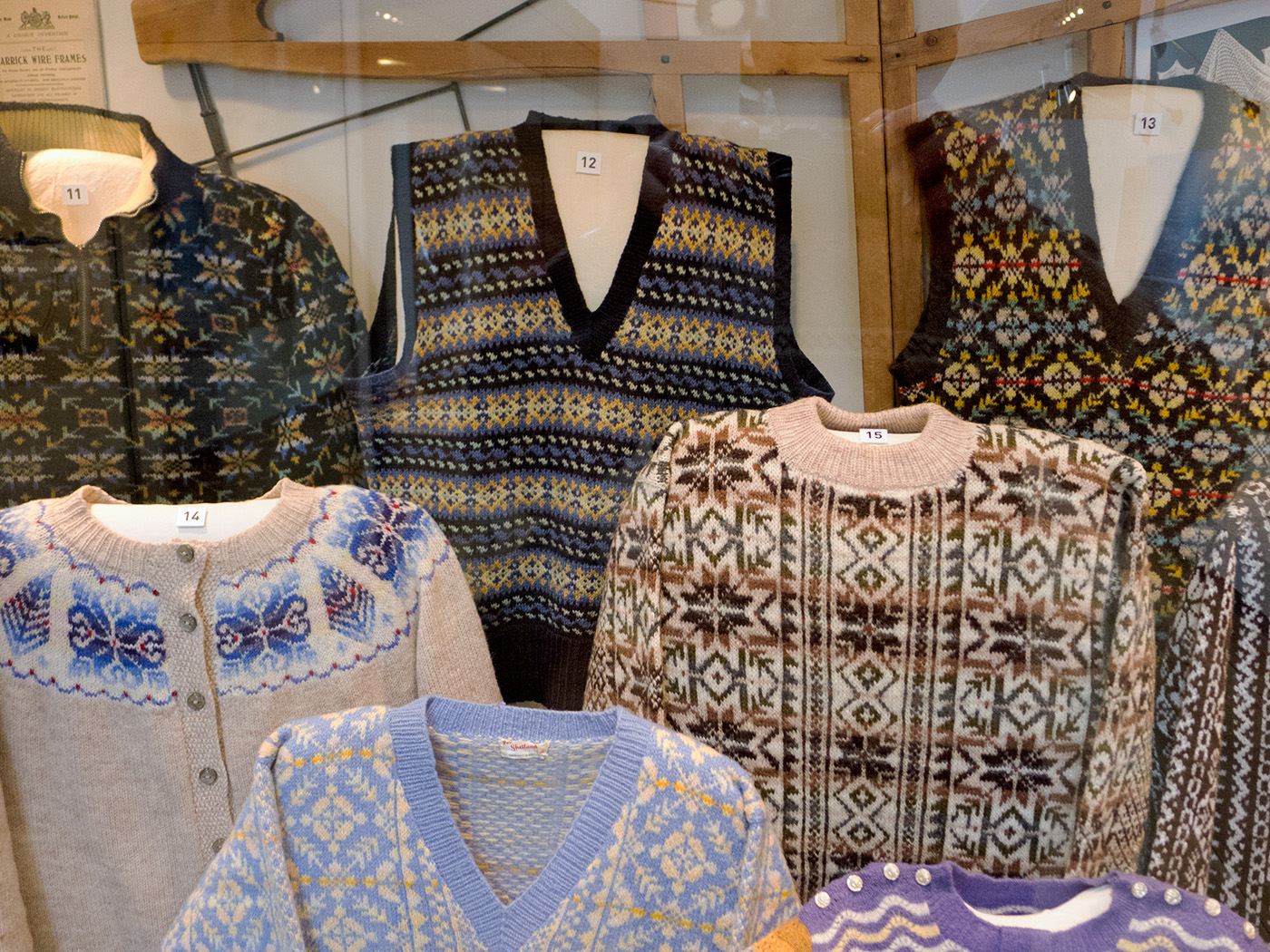
Fair Isle knitwear in the museum

The display galleries are split between two floors. The ground floor, with approximately 500 m^{2} of gallery space, concentrates on the history of Shetland up until 1800, from environmental, geological, and geographical factors, early settlers in the islands, through early agriculture, fishing, early boats, and the rich folklore of Shetland. The 360 m^{2} of first-floor gallery space brings the story of Shetland up to date with exhibits from the last 200 years. These detail the changes in culture, politics, population, and industry, including the development of the knitwear industry and Shetland's association with the sea through fishing, whaling, wartime service, and merchant shipping.

The exhibits in the museum range from items of great historical importance, to items, which although not old, are of great significance to Shetland. From items which tell a story on their own, to items which help form part of a larger picture, and from items as delicate as lace shawls, to complete boats. The Shetland Archives contains records from the 15th to the 21st century, and a big library of local literature.

== Hay's Dock ==
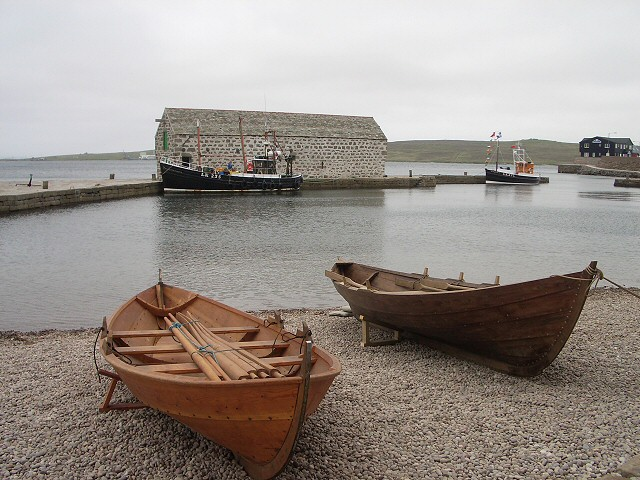
Boats at Hay's Dock

The building sits on the shore of the biggest exhibit, the Category B listed Hay's Dock, which was built in 1815 by the company Hay & Ogilvy. As part of the project the dock area has seen major refurbishment works including the restoration of the pier house, and dredging of the dock itself, which will be home to the museum's floating exhibits.

== Crofthouse ==
The Shetland Crofthouse Museum at Dunrossness is a traditional 19th-century thatched crofthouse.

== Sources ==
- This article is based on http://shetlopedia.com/Shetland_Museum a GFDL wiki.
