= Foula =

Island of the Shetland Islands, Scotland

Fughlaigh (Gaelic); Foula (Scots)
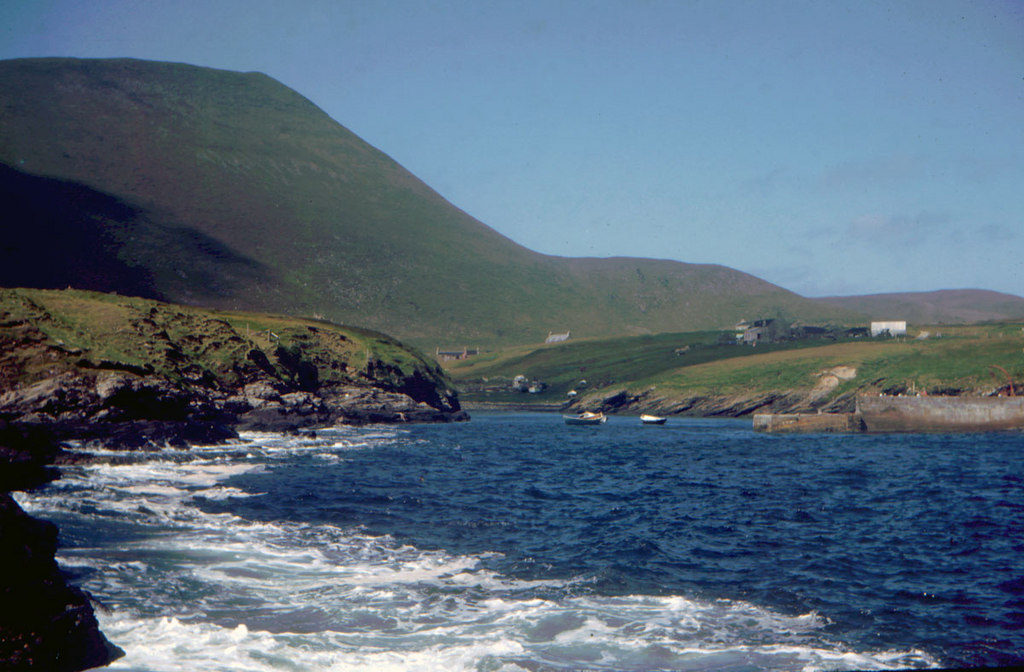
- Da Voe, the harbour of Foula

Location
- Foula shown within Shetland
- OS grid reference: HT960392
- Coordinates: 60.133°N 2.067°W

Name
- Old Norse name: Fuglaey

Physical geography
- Island group: Shetland
- Area: 1,265 hectares (4.88 sq mi)
- Area rank: 43
- Highest elevation: The Sneug 418 m (1,371 ft)

Administration
- Council area: Shetland Islands
- Country: Scotland
- Sovereign state: United Kingdom

Demographics
- Population: 17
- Population rank: 62=
- Population density: 1.34 people/km^{2}
- Largest settlement: Ham
- Foula Lighthouse
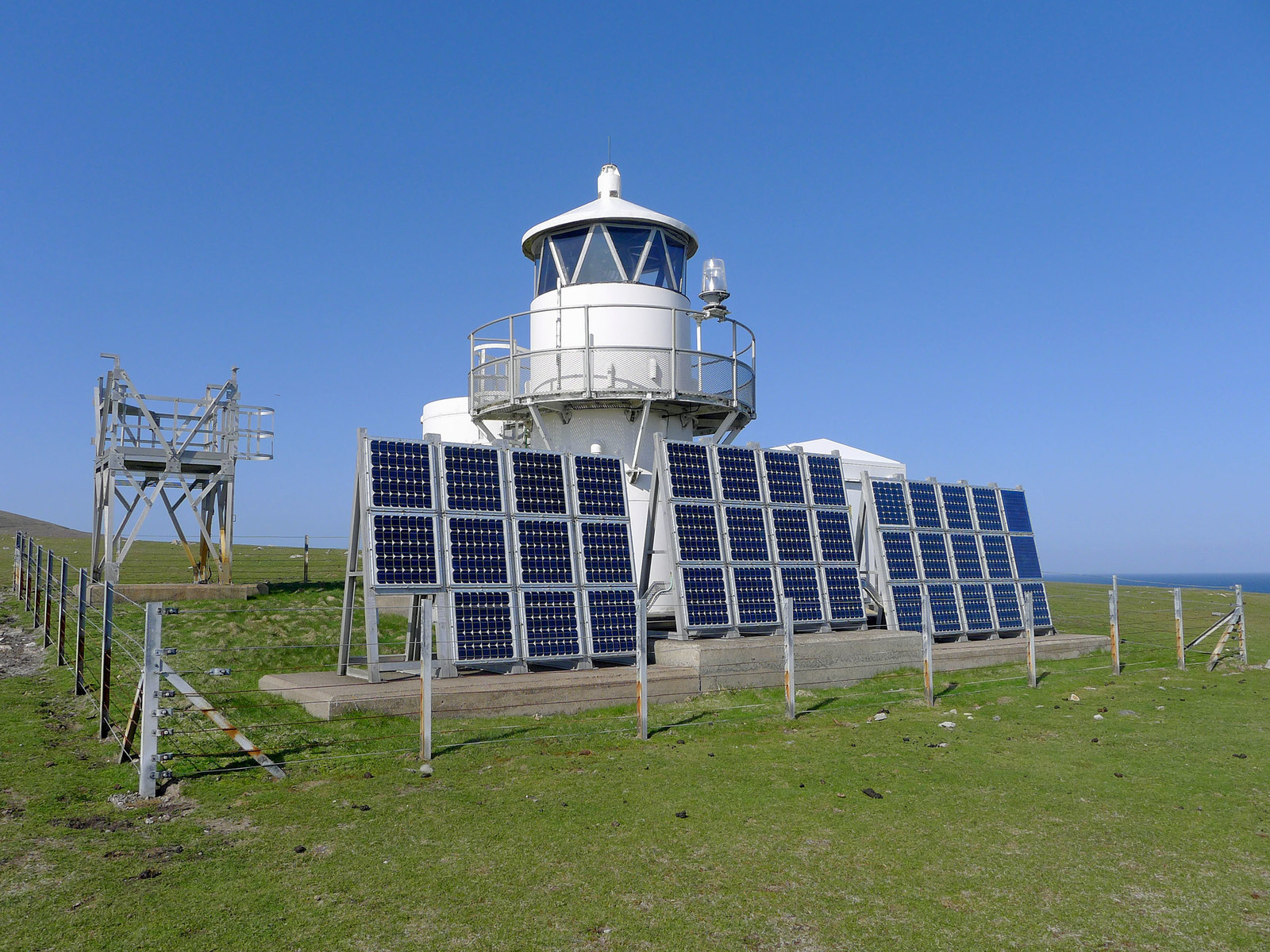
- Constructed: 1986
- Construction: concrete (foundation), metal (tower)
- Height: 8 m (26 ft)
- Shape: cylindrical tower with balcony and lantern
- Markings: White
- Power source: solar power
- Operator: Northern Lighthouse Board
- Focal height: 36 m (118 ft)
- Lens: fourth order Fresnel lens
- Light source: 35 watt metal halide lamps
- Range: 18 nmi (33 km; 21 mi)
- Characteristic: Fl(3) W 15s

Foula (Shaetlan pronunciation: [ˈfuːlə] FOO-lə), located in the Shetland archipelago of Scotland, is one of the United Kingdom's most remote permanently inhabited islands. The liner RMS Oceanic was wrecked on the Shaalds of Foula in 1914. Foula was the location for the film The Edge of the World (1937).

== Toponym ==
The name "Foula" comes from the Old Norse Fugley 'bird island'. On some early Modern maps (such as Willem Blaeu's 1654 map of Orkney and Shetland), it is called Fule or Thule. The former – pronounced "foo-lay"– is just an alternative spelling of Foula. The latter is due to ancient sources – notably Tacitus' Agricola – often locating the mythical land of Thule in the Shetland Islands region, and the phonetic closeness of the island's name. However, the Ancient Norse name post-dates the Thule narrative and is not connected to it.

== Geography ==
Foula lies in the Atlantic Ocean, 15 nautical miles (28 kilometres) west of Walls on Mainland, Shetland. It was part of Walls civil parish and now is in the parish of Walls and Sandness. The island is about 2 1/2 by 3 1/2 miles (4 by 6 kilometres), with a low-lying coastal strip along the east side. With an area of 12.7 km^{2} (4 7/8 sq mi), it is the eighth largest and most westerly of the Shetland Islands. It rises from low broken cliffs in the east to precipitous 150–365 m (490–1,200 ft) cliffs in the west. The island has five peaks, rising to 418 m (1,371 ft) at the Sneug and 376 m (1,234 ft) at the Kame. At the north end is Gaada Stack, a natural arch and towards the south-west is Da Sneck Ida Smaalie, a 30 m deep and 2 m wide crack in the cliffs. Foula lies on the same latitude as Saint Petersburg.

In 2011 Foula had a population of 30 people, living in Hametun and Ham. At the time of the 2022 census the resident population was 17. Islanders previously made a living from fishing – first for whitefish, then lobster. Today, most islanders are crofters with income from sheep farming and birdwatching tourism. The island retains a post office in Ham.

A hidden reef, the "Hoevdi Grund" or the "Shaalds o' Foula", lies just over 3 km (1 1/2 nmi) east of Foula between the island and the Shetland Mainland. Tides here can reach 12 knots (22 km/h; 6 m/s), and as the reef comes to within less than a metre of the surface, it poses a significant threat to shipping.

=== Transport ===
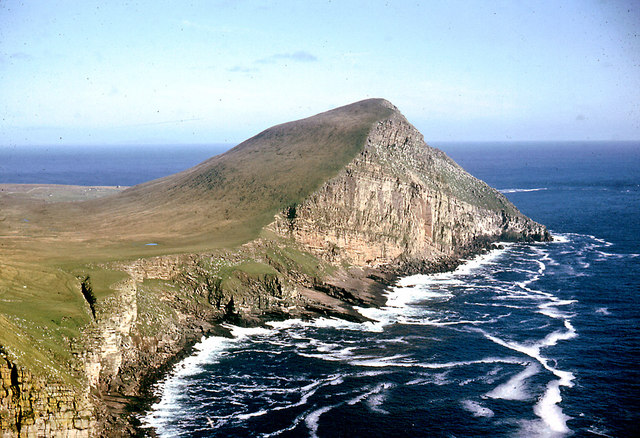
Da Noup, Foula

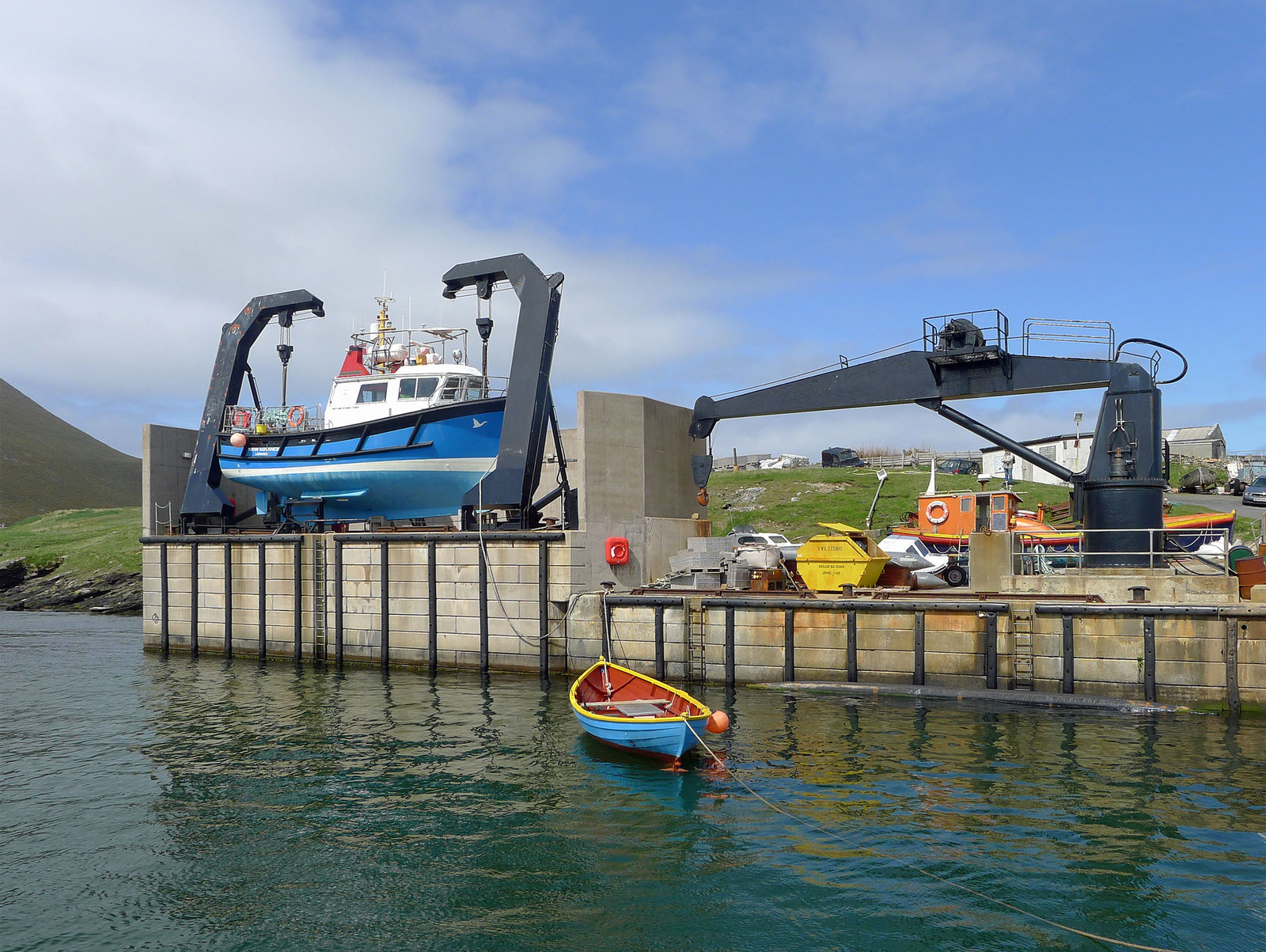
Harbour at Ham with the crane for lifting boats out of the water carrying the ferry New Advance

BK Marine Limited operates the ferry service from Ham to Walls on Mainland, Shetland. New Advance carries up to 12 passengers and completes the voyage in about two hours. Flights take off from Foula Airfield to Tingwall Airport. A ferry service ran from Foula to Scalloway until 2010.

There is little shelter for boats in the island. The only beach is at the head of Ham Voe on the east coast. Local boats, including the mail boat, are hauled out of the water.

== Wildlife ==
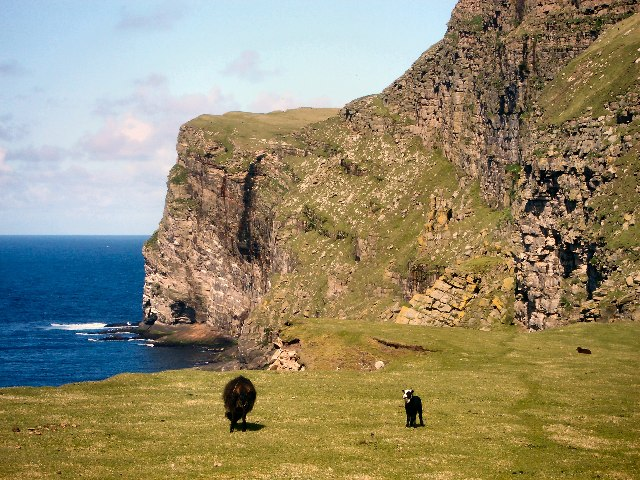
Cliffs in Foula

The island's 370-metre (1,210 ft) cliffs are home to numerous birds, including Arctic terns, red-throated divers and great skuas, and birders make up the bulk of visitors to the island. The island has been designated an Important Bird Area (IBA) by BirdLife International because it supports large colonies of cliff- and moorland-nesting seabirds.

== History ==
=== Prehistory ===
Foula was first inhabited as far back as 5,000 years ago. Between 2006 and 2008, the Bath & Camerton Archeological Society took several trips to Foula to study prehistoric standing stones. A particular sub-circular stone circle of interest was discovered in 2006 at Da Heights in the north of Foula. A further investigation launched in 2007 revealed that the sub-circular stone construction was man-made, elliptical in shape with its long axis pointing towards the mid-winter solstice, built before 1000 BC.

=== 15th to 19th centuries ===
In 1490, the Ciske family's estates were divided and Vaila and Foula became the property of Alv Knutsson. However, the Ciskes were Norwegian, and as Scotland had annexed Shetland a few decades before, there were confusing and conflicting claims of ownership.

In 1720, a smallpox epidemic struck the two hundred people living on Foula. Because the islanders were so isolated from the rest of the world, they had no immunity to smallpox, unlike most North European peoples at that time, and nine out of ten of the island's population died in the epidemic.

Foula remained on the Julian calendar when the rest of the Kingdom of Great Britain adopted the Gregorian calendar in 1752. Foula adhered to the Julian calendar by keeping 1800 as a leap year, but it did not observe a leap year in 1900. As a result, Foula is now one day ahead of the Julian calendar and 12 days behind the Gregorian, observing Christmas Day on 6 January Gregorian and New Year on 13 January Gregorian.

The writer and journalist John Sands lived on Foula and Papa Stour for a while during the late 19th century. He opposed the prevailing truck system and drew political cartoons lampooning its deficiencies. In one, he drew Foula as a beautiful young woman being strangled by a boa-constrictor labelled 'landlordism' watched by other reptiles called 'missionary', 'laird' and 'truck'.

The island was one of the last places where the Norn language was spoken (although it is claimed that Walter Sutherland of Skaw in Unst was the last speaker), and the local dialect is strongly influenced by Old Norse. In 1774 George Low, a young Scottish clergyman, visited Foula hoping to find remnants of oral literature in Norn, then nearing extinction. He found fragments of songs, ballads and romances, and from his best source, an old farmer called William Henry, the ballad now known as "Hildina". Henry was quite poorly acquainted with the language, so that, although he had as a child memorised all 35 stanzas of the ballad in the original Norn, he could give Low only a summary of its content rather than a translation. "Hildina" is the only extant poem in Norn.

=== 20th century ===
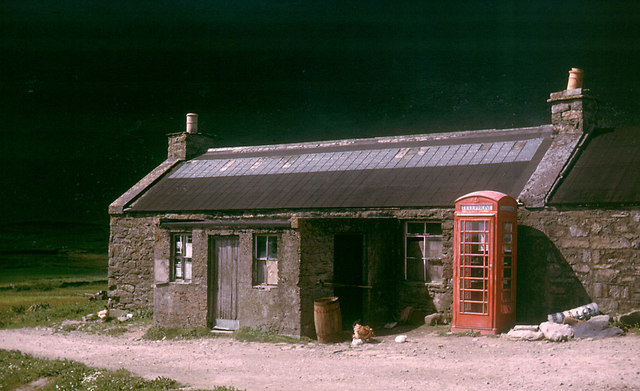
Foula's post office in 1964

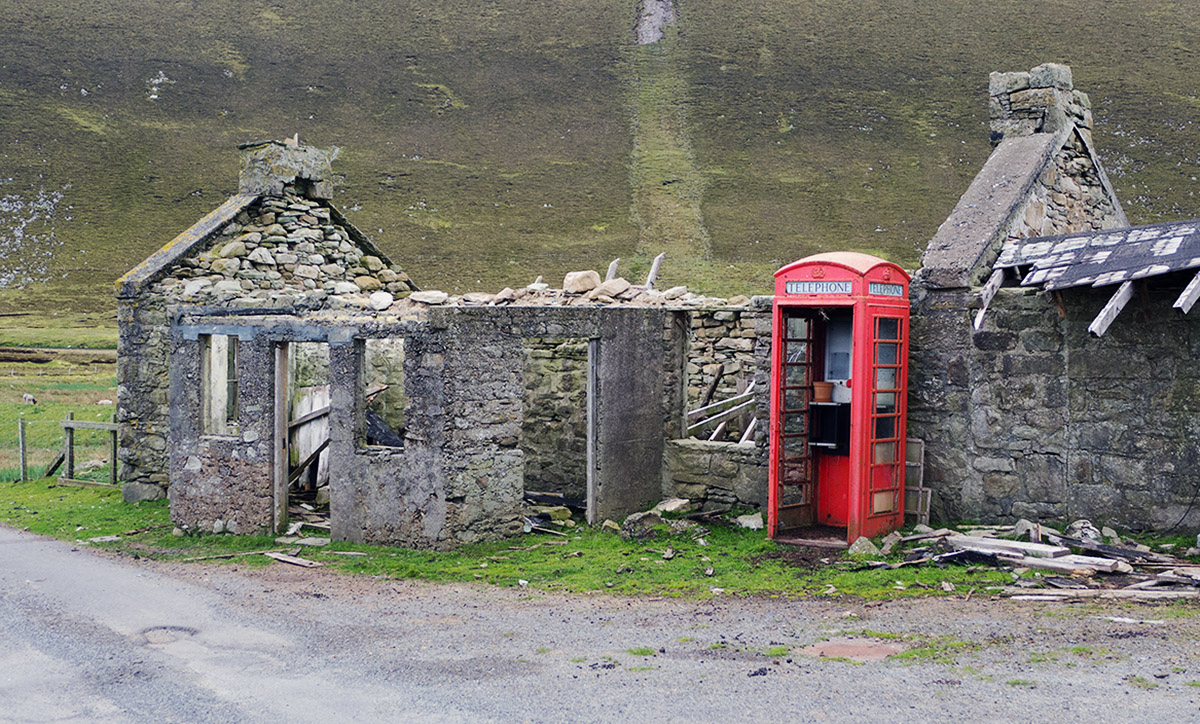
The former post office in 2016

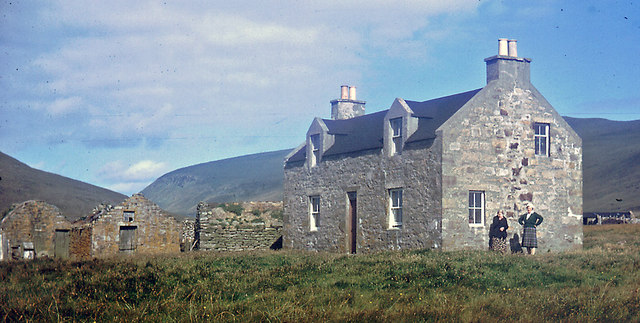
The farm of Punds in 1964

Professor Ian Holbourn purchased Foula around 1900, becoming its last laird. He described the disaster of 8 September 1914, when the armed merchant cruiser HMS Oceanic, formerly a White Star liner, wrecked on the Shaalds o' Foula. Holbourn embarked upon the RMS Lusitania in May 1915 and survived its sinking.

The professor's grandson, Robert Holbourn, a naval architect, acted as the island's "Peat Marshal" for many years. Peat is a valuable and scarce resource for heat and fuel in Shetland. Its cutting requires skill, taking several years to master. The most able islanders become known as the 'cutters' and, in the spirit of a long-standing Foula tradition, all able-bodied men are now and then "bid to the banks" of women who "didn't have a cutter in the house".

Simon Martin, who stayed in Foula for five years in the 1970s while salvaging metal from Oceanic, describes the island as follows:

Foula, or Ultima Thule, as it was known as far back as the Roman times, rises impurely out of the water, and from the Shetland Isles mainland its five peaks, the Noup, Hamnafield, the Sneug, Kame and Soberlie stand out starkly and characteristically. The cliffs on the west side vie with those of St Kilda as the highest sheer cliffs in Britain, 1,200 feet (370 metres) of solid rock towering from the sea. Foula, or Fughley as it was once also known, means literally 'Bird Island', with an estimated half million birds of various breeds sharing the rock with the inhabitants. The island’s surface largely consisting of a peat bog on rock.

A lighthouse at the southern tip of the island was built in 1986. Originally powered by acetylene gas, it has been converted to solar and wind power.

== Fishing ==
The Annual Reports of the Fishery Board for Scotland provide an insight into fishing in Foula in the years before the First World War.

Fishery Statistics

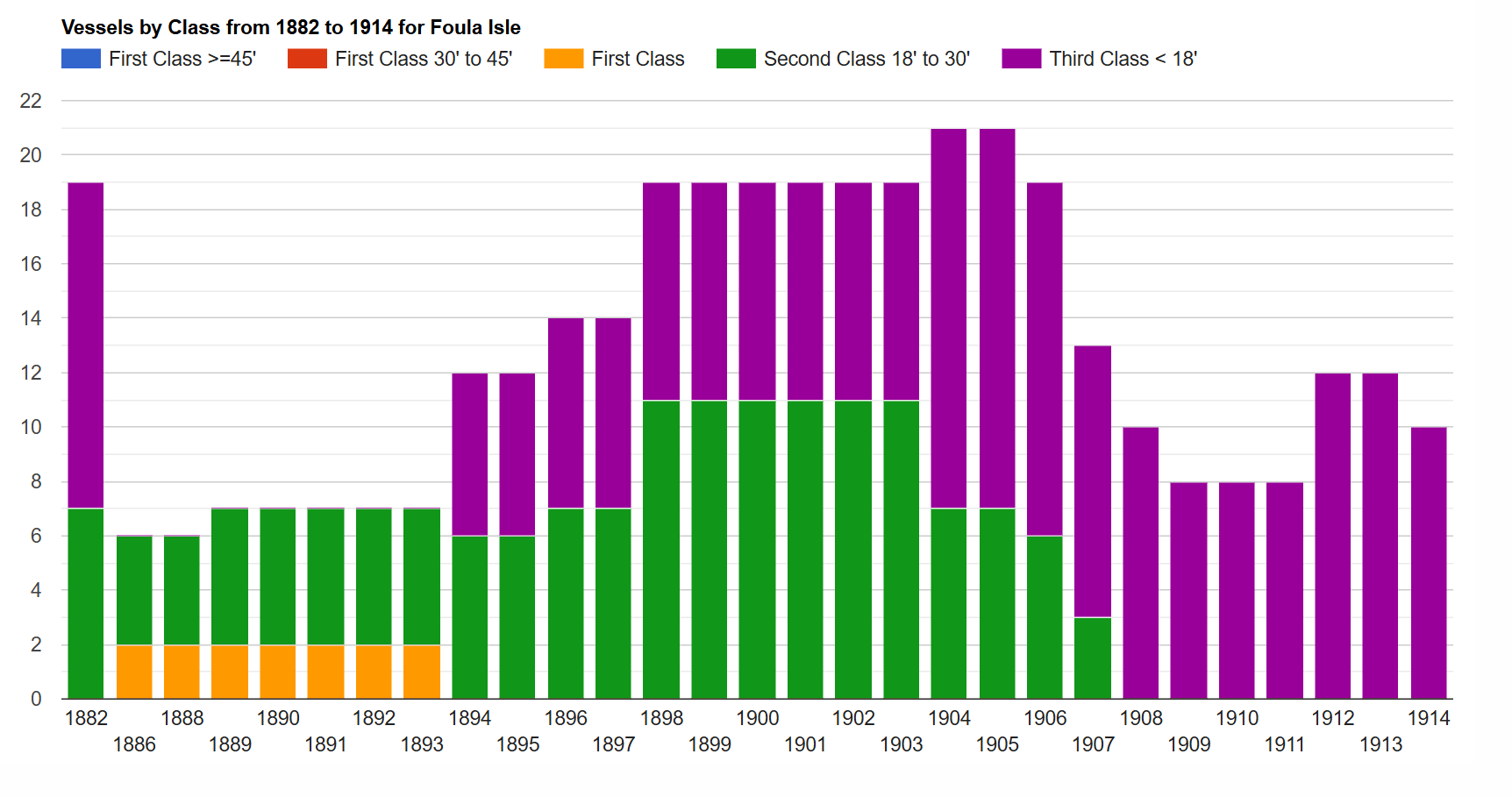
Vessels by class

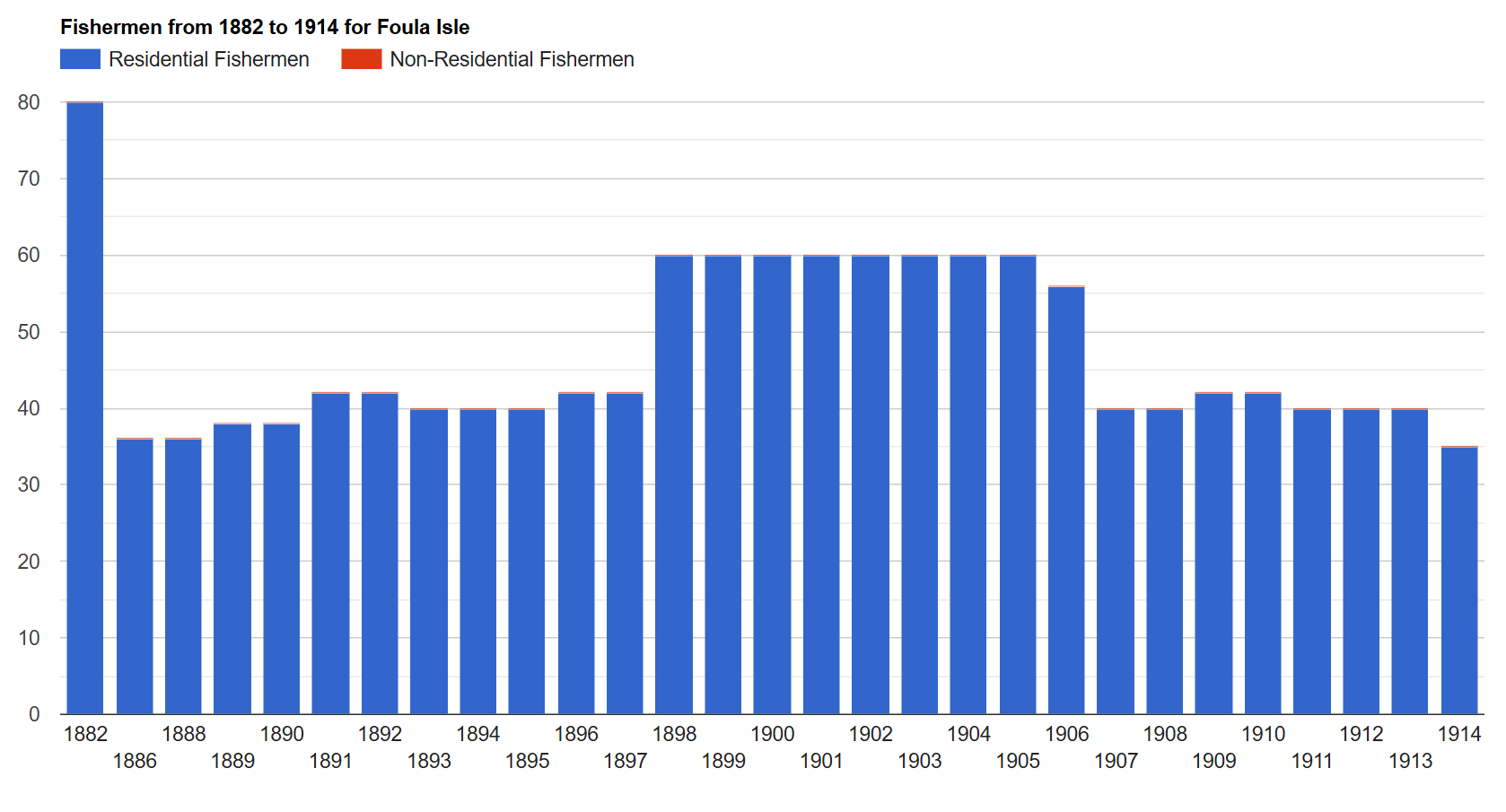
Fishermen

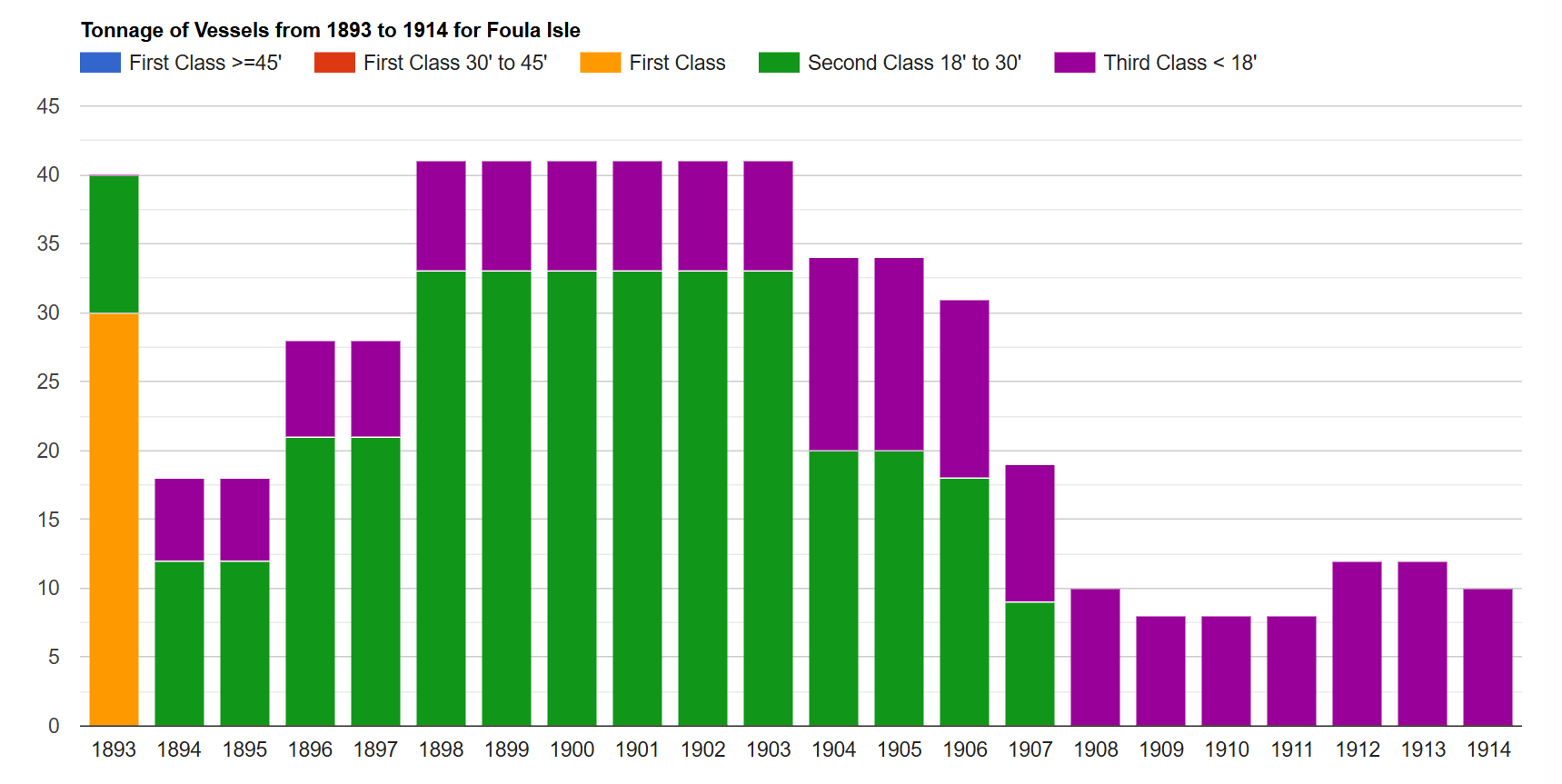
Tonnage of vessels

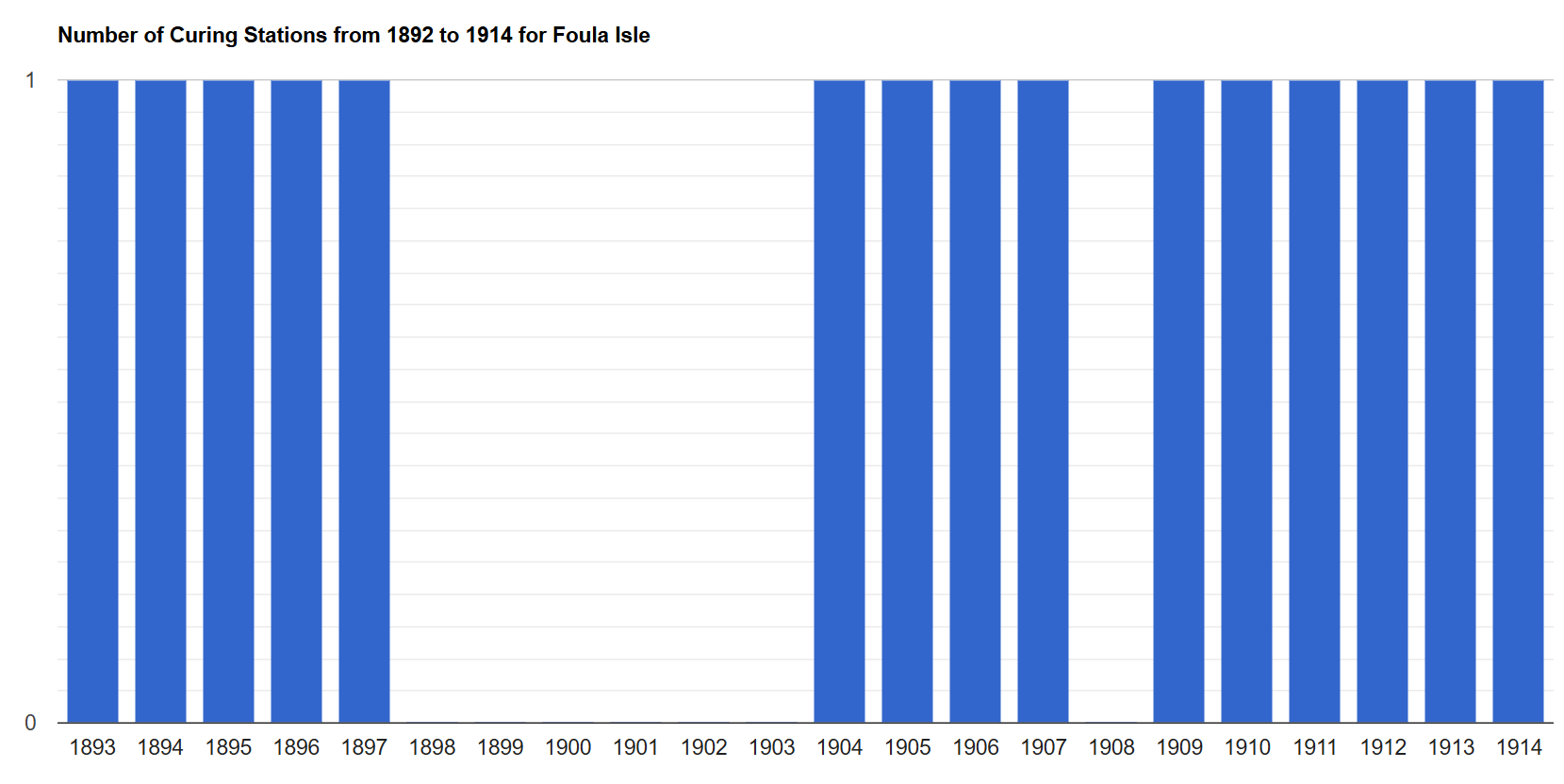
Number of curing stations

== Culture and the arts ==
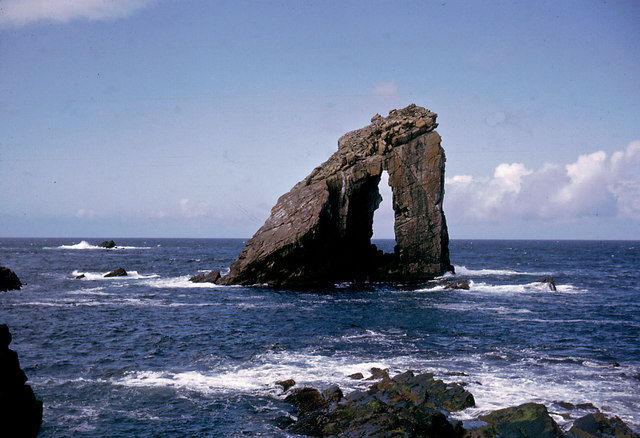
Gaada Stack, Foula

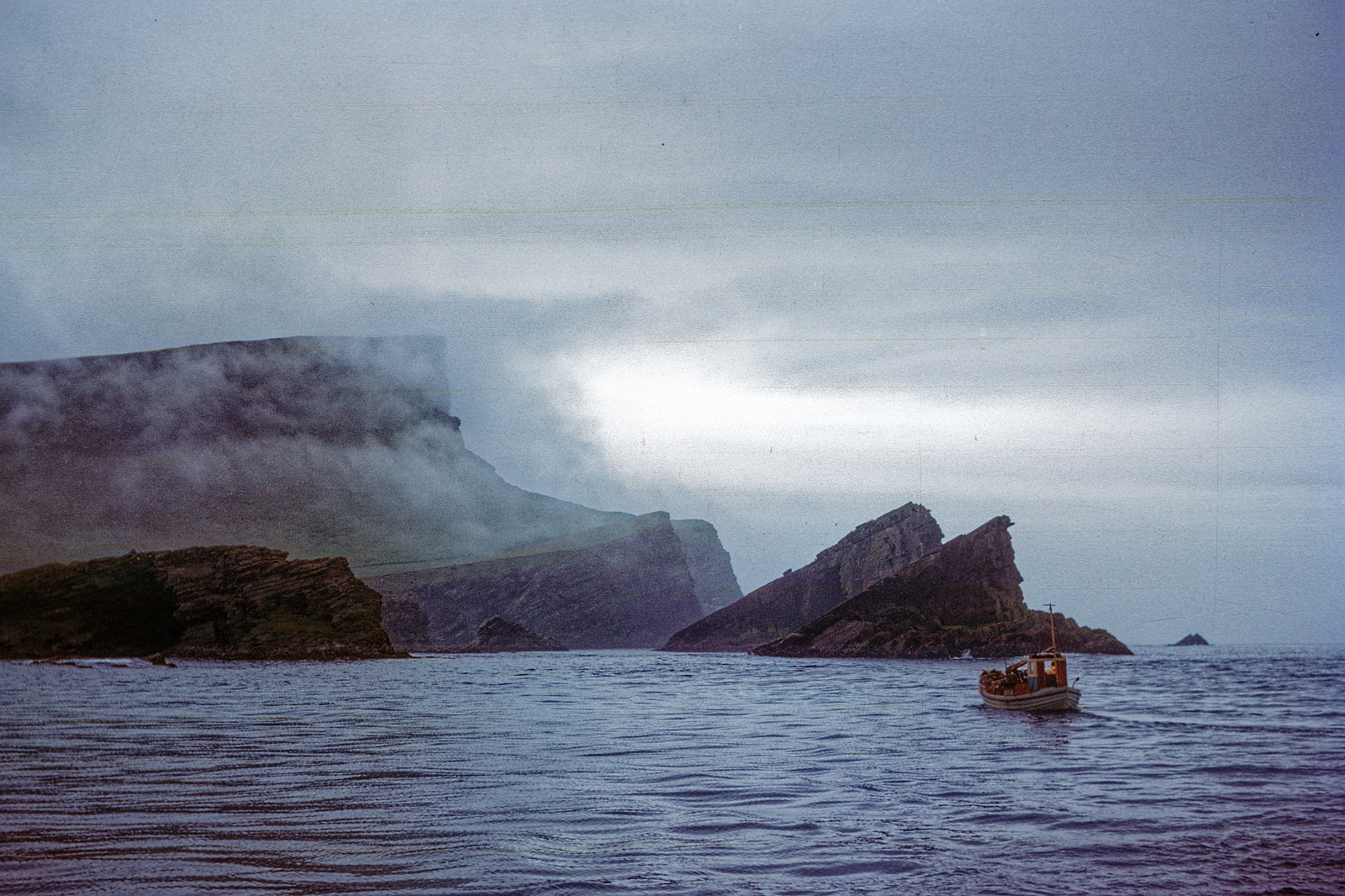
Fishing boat off the northern coast of the island

=== Religion ===
Many inhabitants of Foula attend the Presbyterian Kirk, also known as Baxter Chapel, that is part of the Church of Scotland. It is built of grey stone and is situated "on the tail of 7 Hamnafield".

=== Film ===
- Michael Powell's film The Edge of the World (1937) is a dramatisation based on the true story of the evacuation of the last 36 inhabitants of the remote island of St Kilda, on 29 August 1930. St Kilda lies in the Atlantic Ocean, 64 kilometres (40 miles) west-northwest of North Uist in the Outer Hebrides; the inhabitants spoke Gaelic. Powell was unable to get permission to film in St Kilda. Undaunted, he made the film over four months during the summer of 1936 on Foula, where the islanders speak Shetland dialect.
- Return To The Edge Of The World (1978) is a documentary capturing a reunion of the 1937 film's cast and crew, 40 years later, as they revisit the island.
- In 2023 Polish writer and director Klaudiusz Chrostowski made a low-budget film Ultima Thule, starring Jakub Gierszał as a 30-year-old man arriving on the island to get over the death of his father. The film was almost entirely shot on Foula and features Arthur Henri, a local inhabitant, in the main supporting role. The film won the Best Micro Budget Film Award at Gdynia Film Festival in 2023.

=== Folklore, festivities and traditions ===
Foula's inhabitants preserve many Norse traditions of folklore and festivities. They still follow the Julian calendar for Christmas celebrations, with all the islanders gathering in one house on 6 January. New Year's Day falls on 13 January.

=== Poetry ===
Vagaland's poem "Da Sang o da Papa men" about the fishermen of Papa Stour includes an insistent chorus chant, "Rowin Foula Doon". This refers to the fishermen's practice of rowing their open fishing boat out to sea until the high cliffs of Foula were no longer visible. This entailed the boat's being some 96 kilometres (60 mi) west of Papa Stour.

== Geodesy ==
The Sneug in Foula was the origin (meridian) of the 6 inch and 1:2500 Ordnance Survey maps of Orkney and Shetland.

== Notable residents ==
- Martin Ferguson Smith (b. 1940), scholar and writer. Since retiring in 1995 he has lived in voluntary self-isolation on Foula.
- Ian Holbourn (1872 – 1935), was Laird of Foula, a professor and lecturer at the University of Oxford, and a writer.
- Sheila Gear, author of Foula, Island West of the Sun (published 1983 by Robert Hale Limited). She was born in Oxford and studied zoology at Aberdeen University. She married Jim Gear, a crofter, and wrote a book about crofter life in Shetland.
- John Sands (1826–1900) of Ormiston, was a Scottish freelance journalist and artist with an interest in archaeology and folk customs. He spent almost a year on St Kilda and lived on several other remote islands including Foula.

== See also ==
- Fair Isle
- List of lighthouses in Scotland
- List of listed buildings in Walls and Sandness, Shetland Islands
- List of Northern Lighthouse Board lighthouses
