= Lollie Graham =

Scottish author and poet

Laurence I. "Lollie" Graham (1924–2008) was an author and poet from Scotland.

Born in Stromfirth, Shetland, in 1924. The Graham family moved to one of the new croft holdings at Veensgarth, Tingwall and Graham lived there until he died. He had been a part-time crofter most of his life, and active in local politics.

After World War II, Graham studied at the University of Edinburgh and Moray House College, Edinburgh, during which time he was active in literary circles and co-edited a volume of Scottish student verse. He returned to Shetland to take up a teaching post and taught at the Anderson Educational Institute and the Scalloway Junior High School. He was also headmaster at Urafirth Primary School and latterly the long-term and much loved headmaster of Gott Primary School. He contributed biographical sketches to the important textbook The Shetland Book (1967), edited by Andrew T. Cluness.

Graham provided an introduction and a commentary to Shetland Poetry - a recital in 1950, arranged by himself, his brother John J. Graham, and T. A. Robertson (Vagaland), with assistance from A. T. Cluness in selecting the poems. The text included a translation into Danish by Martin Melsted of an article by William J. Tait on Shetland language and literature.

He was Joint Editor of The New Shetlander from 1956 till 1988 along with his brother, the novelist John J. Graham. He was editor of Shetland Crofters (1986), co-editor with Brian Smith of MacDiarmid in Shetland, a fine collection of essays on Hugh MacDiarmid published to coincide with the centenary of the birth of this eminent Whalsay resident in 1992, Hjaltland (1993), and A Shetland Anthology (1998).

In 2000, the Shetland Library published his selected poems in Love's Laebrack Sang, a volume which demonstrates Graham as both a committed political poet, engaged in making response to the public events of the day via satire, and a Shetland poet with a deep love of his community and its history.

Lollie Graham's oldest daughter is the artist Ruth Graham.
