= The New Shetlander =

Scotland's longest running literary magazine

The New Shetlander is Scotland's longest-running literary magazine, founded in 1947, and edited originally by Peter Jamieson. Its title and to some extent its content were modeled on the socialist journal The Shetlander, published in the early twenties.Following financial difficulties, since 1956 it has been published by the Shetland Council of Social Service and its successor Voluntary Action Shetland. It has had a central role in Shetland's Literature since it was founded. For the greater part of its existence thus far, 1956 till 1998, the New Shetlander benefited from the editorial care of the brothers John J. Graham and Laurence I. Graham. In 1998 Alex Cluness and John Hunter took on the task of following that sterling team. In 2002 the historian Brian Smith and the author Laureen Johnson became editors.

The New Shetlander now appears three times a year, price £3.50. In 2007 it celebrated its 60th anniversary by publishing issue number 239. A redesign and relaunch took place with issue 294 in 2021.

The archive is a treasure trove of varied material, reflecting the many changes Shetland has gone through since World War II.

The New Shetlander′s office is located at Market House, Market Street, Lerwick, Shetland.
