= Northern Isles =

Pair of archipelagos near Scotland

Location
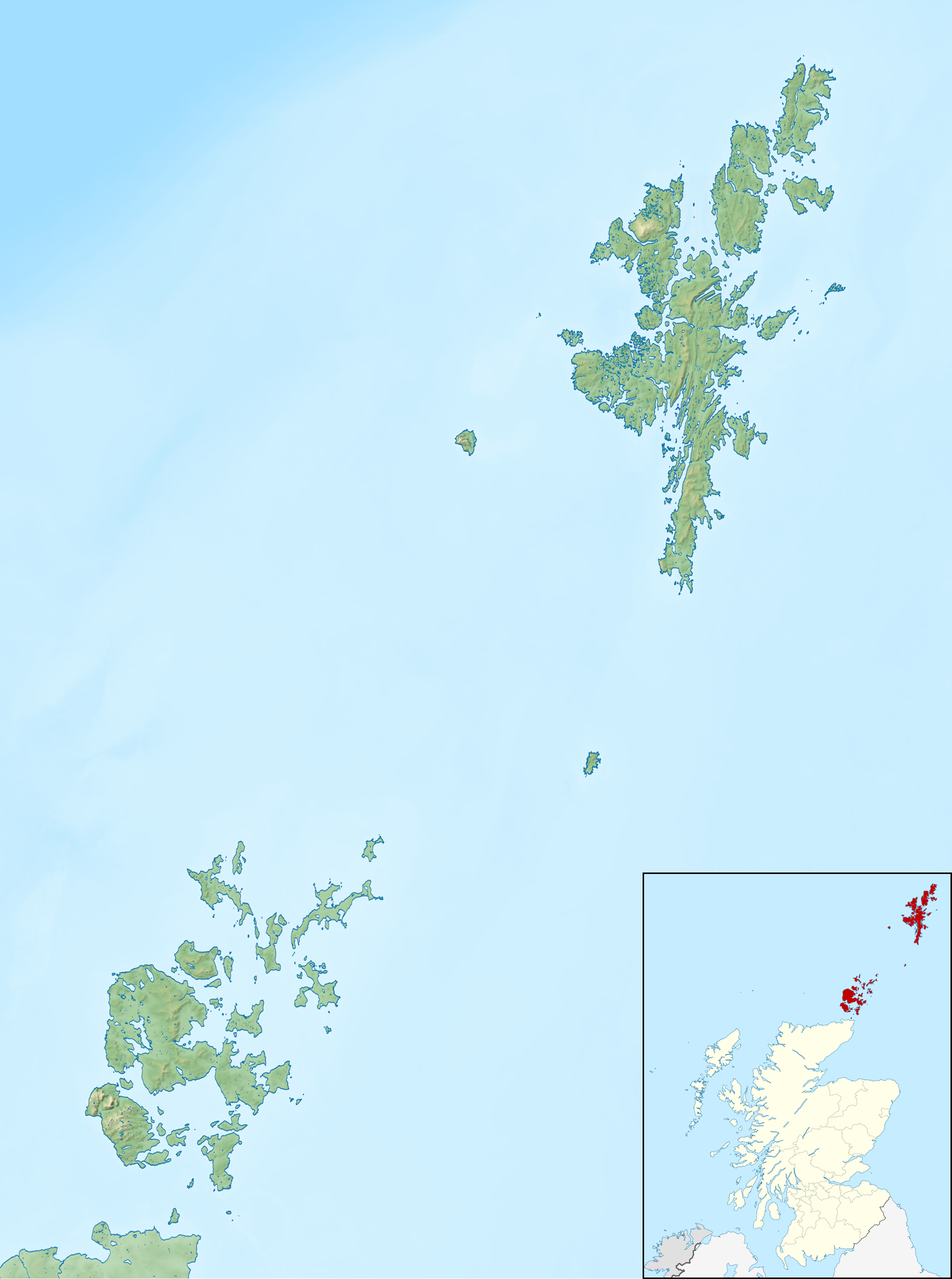
- The Northern Isles The Northern Isles within Scotland
- OS grid reference: HY99
- Coordinates: 59°50′N 2°00′W

Physical geography
- Island group: British Isles
- Area: 2,458 km^{2} (949 sq mi)
- Highest elevation: Ward Hill 481 m (1,578 ft)

Administration
- Country: Scotland
- Sovereign state: United Kingdom

Demographics
- Population: 44,630 (2025)
- Population density: 18/km^{2} (47/sq mi)
- Largest settlement: Kirkwall

The Northern Isles (Scots: Northern Isles; Scottish Gaelic: Na h-Eileanan a Tuath; Old Norse: Norðreyjar) are two archipelagos comprising Orkney and Shetland that are located off the north coast of the Scottish mainland. The climate is cool and temperate and highly influenced by the surrounding seas. There are a total of 36 inhabited islands, with the fertile agricultural islands of Orkney contrasting with the more rugged Shetland islands to the north, where the economy is more dependent on fishing and the oil wealth of the surrounding seas. Both archipelagos have a developing renewable energy industry. They share a common Pictish and Norse history, and were part of the Kingdom of Norway before being absorbed into the Kingdom of Scotland in the 15th century. The islands played a significant naval role during the world wars of the 20th century.

Tourism is important to the Northern Isles, with their distinctive prehistoric ruins playing a key part in their attraction, and there are regular ferry and air connections with mainland Scotland. The Scandinavian influence remains strong, especially in local folklore and both island chains have strong, though distinct local cultures. The names of the islands are dominated by the Norse heritage, although some may retain pre-Celtic elements.

== Geography ==
Shetland

The phrase "Northern Isles" generally refers to the islands within the Orkney and Shetland boundaries. The Island of Stroma, which lies between mainland Scotland and Orkney, is part of Caithness, so for local government purposes it falls under the jurisdiction of the Highland council area, rather than that of Orkney. It is nevertheless clearly one of the "northern isles" of Scotland. Fair Isle and Foula are outliers of Shetland, but would normally be considered part of Shetland, and thus of the Northern Isles. Conversely, Sule Skerry and Sule Stack are both administratively part of Orkney- but due to being small, uninhabitable and significantly distant from the rest of the isles, they are not generally considered to be part of the "Northern Isles" and are often overlooked in maps of the county. Other small islands that lie off the north coast of Scotland are in Highland, and are also not usually considered to be part of the Northern Isles.

Orkney has 20 inhabited islands and Shetland has 16.

Orkney is situated 16 kilometres (10 mi) north of the coast of mainland Scotland, separated from it by the waters of the Pentland Firth. The largest island of Orkney, known as the "Mainland" has an area of 523.25 square kilometres (202.03 sq mi), making it the sixth largest Scottish island. Its total population in 2001 was 19,245, and its largest town is Kirkwall. Shetland is around 170 kilometres (110 mi) north of mainland Scotland. It covers an area of 1,468 square kilometres (567 mi^{2}) and its coastline is 2,702 kilometres (1,679 mi) long. Lerwick, the capital and largest settlement, has a population of around 7,500. About half of the archipelago's total population of 22,000 people live within 16 kilometres (10 mi) of the town.

== Geology ==
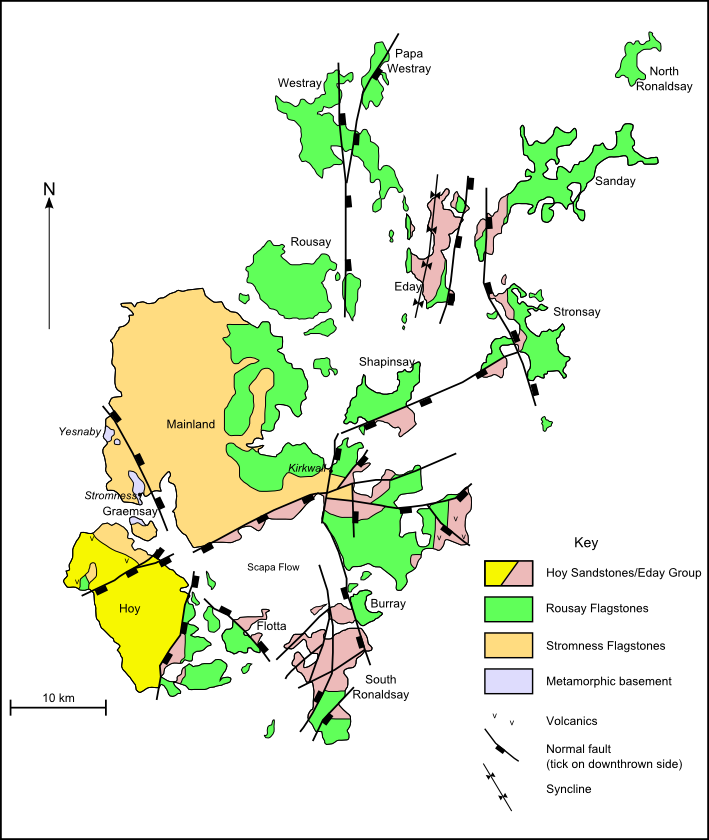
Geology of Orkney

The superficial rock of Orkney is almost entirely Old Red Sandstone, mostly of Middle Devonian age. As in the neighbouring mainland county of Caithness, this sandstone rests upon the metamorphic rocks of the Moine series. This can be seen on the Orkney Mainland, where a narrow strip of the older rock is exposed between Stromness and Inganess, and also on the small island of Graemsay.

Middle Devonian basaltic volcanic rocks are found on western Hoy, on Deerness in eastern Mainland and on Shapinsay. A correlation between the Hoy volcanics and the other two exposures has been proposed, but because of differences in their chemical makeup, this remains uncertain. Lamprophyre dykes of Late Permian age are found throughout Orkney. Glacial striation and the presence of chalk and flint erratics that originated from the bed of the North Sea demonstrate the influence of ice action on the geomorphology of the islands. Boulder clay is also abundant, and moraines cover substantial areas.

The geology of Shetland is quite different from that of Orkney. It is extremely complex, with numerous faults and fold axes. The Shetland Islands are the northern outpost of the Caledonian orogeny, and there are outcrops of Lewisian, Dalriadan and Moine metamorphic rocks whose histories are similar to those of their counterparts on the Scottish mainland. There are also small Old Red Sandstone deposits and granite intrusions. Shetland's most distinctive geological feature is the ultrabasic ophiolite, peridotite and gabbro on Unst and Fetlar, which are remnants of the Iapetus Ocean floor. There are oil-bearing sediments in the surrounding seas, on which much of Shetland's economy depends.

Geological evidence shows that, sometime around 6100 BC, a tsunami caused by the Storegga Slides hit the Northern Isles (as well as much of the east coast of Scotland), and may have created a wave of up to 25 metres (82 ft) high in the voes of Shetland, where modern populations are largest.

== Climate ==
The Northern Isles have a cool, temperate climate that is remarkably mild and steady for such a northerly latitude, due to the influence of the surrounding seas and the Gulf Stream. In Shetland, average peak temperatures are 5 °C (41 °F) in February and 15 °C (59 °F) in August. Temperatures over 21 °C (70 °F) are rare. The frost-free period may be as short as three months.

The average annual rainfall is 982 millimetres (38.7 in) in Orkney and 1,168 millimetres (46.0 in) in Shetland. Winds are a key feature of the climate. In summer, there are almost constant breezes. In winter, there are frequent strong winds: Orkney has an average of 52 hours of gales annually. The Burradale wind farm in Shetland, which operates with five Vestas V47 660 kW turbines, achieved a world record of 57.9% capacity over the course of 2005 due to the persistent strong winds.

Snowfall is usually confined to the period of November to February and seldom lies on the ground for more than a day. Less rain falls between April and August than at other times of the year, but no month has an average rainfall of less than 50 mm (2.0 in). In Shetland there are 1082 hours of bright sunshine per year, on average, and overcast days are common.

To tourists, one of the fascinations of the islands is their "nightless" summers. On the longest day in Shetland there are over 19 hours of daylight, and it never gets completely dark. The long twilight is known in the Northern Isles as the "simmer dim". Winter nights are correspondingly long, with less than six hours of daylight at midwinter. At this time of year the aurora borealis can occasionally be seen on the northern horizon during moderate auroral activity.

== Prehistory ==
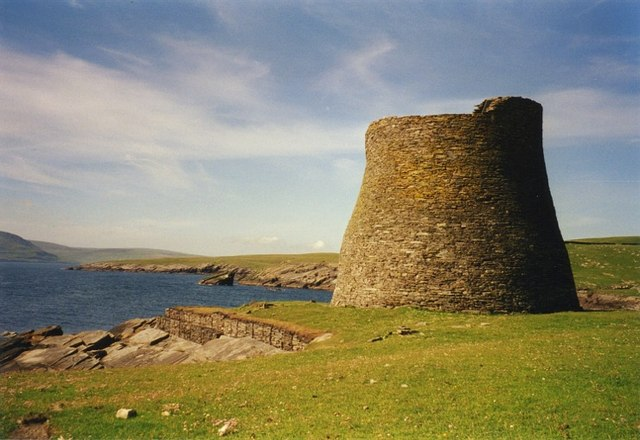
The Iron Age Broch of Mousa

There are numerous important prehistoric remains in Orkney, especially from the Neolithic period. Four of these remains compose the Heart of Neolithic Orkney UNESCO World Heritage Site (designated as such in 1999). They are: Skara Brae; Maes Howe; the Stones of Stenness; and the Ring of Brodgar. The Knap of Howar Neolithic farmstead on the island of Papa Westray is probably the oldest preserved house in northern Europe. This structure was inhabited for 900 years, beginning around 3700 BC, but it had evidently been built on the site of an even older settlement. The Shetland Islands are also extremely rich in physical remains from prehistoric eras: They contain a total of over 5,000 archaeological sites. On the island of Fetlar, there is a dividing wall, dating from the Neolithic period, that at one time extended for 4 kilometres (2.5 mi) across the island. It is known as Funzie Girt. But it is the Iron Age that has provided the most outstanding archaeology in Shetland. Numerous brochs were erected during that period. The finest preserved example of these distinctive round towers is the Broch of Mousa. In 2011, a site known as "the Crucible of Iron Age Shetland", which includes the Broch of Mousa, Old Scatness and Jarlshof, joined the UK's "Tentative List" of World Heritage Sites.

== History, culture and politics ==
=== Pictish times ===
The culture that built the brochs is unknown, but by the late Iron Age, the Northern Isles had become part of the Pictish kingdom. The most common archaeological relics from that period are symbol stones. One of the best examples of these stones is on the Brough of Birsay: It depicts three warriors with spears and sword scabbards, as well as characteristic Pictish symbols. In 1958, a trove of silver metalwork, known as the St Ninian's Isle Treasure, was discovered. The silver bowls, jewellery and other pieces it contains are believed to date from around 800 AD. According to O'Dell (1959), "The treasure is the best survival of Scottish silver metalwork from the period .... [T]he brooches show a variety of typical Pictish forms, with both animal-head and lobed geometrical forms of terminal".

Christianity probably arrived in Orkney in the 6th century, and organised church authority emerged in the 8th century. An Ogham–inscribed artefact known as the Buckquoy spindle-whorl was found at a Pictish site on Birsay. There has been controversy about its origin and meaning, but it is now generally considered to be of Irish Christian origin. From the late sixth to the late eighth century, the Papar, monks from Ireland and Scotland, established eremitic communities in the Northern Isles. They brought with them improved manuring practices that enriched and deepened local soils to support the cultivation of barley and oats.

=== Norse era ===
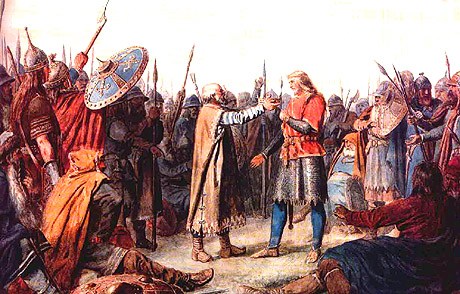
King Olav Tryggvason of Norway, who forcibly Christianised Orkney. Painting by Peter Nicolai Arbo.

The 8th century was also the time when the Vikings started invading the Scottish seaboard. They brought to the Northern Isles a new culture and a new language; rendering the fate of the existing indigenous peoples uncertain. According to the Orkneyinga Saga, Vikings then made the islands the headquarters of the pirate expeditions they carried out against Norway and the coasts of mainland Scotland. According to some sources, in 875, the Norwegian king Harald Hårfagre ("Harald Fair Hair") annexed the Northern Isles and gifted Orkney and Shetland to Rognvald Eysteinsson as an earldom in recompense for the death of his son in battle in Scotland. (Some scholars believe this story is apocryphal and is based instead on events connected with the later voyages of Magnus III of Norway, known as Magnus Barelegs.)

In 995, King Olaf I of Norway (Olav Tryggvasson) fully Christianised the islands by fiat, when he stopped in South Walls on his way from Ireland to Norway. The king summoned the jarl Sigurd the Stout and said, "I order you and all your subjects to be baptised. If you refuse, I'll have you killed on the spot and I swear I will ravage every island with fire and steel." Unsurprisingly, Sigurd agreed, and the islands became Christian at a stroke. In the early 11th century, they received their own bishop (the Bishop of Orkney).

=== Annexation by Scotland ===
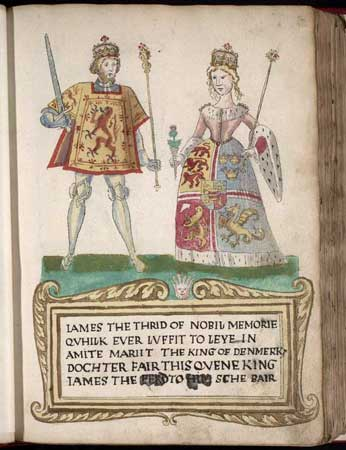
James III and Margaret, whose betrothal led to Shetland passing from Norway to Scotland

In the 14th century, Orkney and Shetland remained a Norwegian province, but Scottish influence was growing. Jon Haraldsson, who was murdered in Thurso in 1231, was the last of an unbroken line of Norse jarls, and thereafter the earls were Scots noblemen of the houses of Angus and St. Clair. In 1468 Shetland was pledged by Christian I, in his capacity as King of Norway, as security against the payment of the dowry of his daughter Margaret, betrothed to James III of Scotland. As the money was never paid, the connection with the crown of Scotland became permanent. In 1470 William Sinclair, 1st Earl of Caithness ceded his title to James III and the following year the Northern Isles were directly annexed to Scotland.

=== 17th, 18th and 19th centuries ===
From the early 15th century on the Shetlanders had sold their goods through the Hanseatic League of German merchantmen. This trade with the North German towns lasted until the 1707 Act of Union when high salt duties prohibited the German merchants from trading with Shetland. Shetland then went into an economic depression as the Scottish and local traders were not as skilled in trading with salted fish. However, some local merchant-lairds took up where the German merchants had left off, and fitted out their own ships to export fish from Shetland to the Continent. For the independent farmer/fishermen of Shetland this had negative consequences, as they now had to fish for these merchant-lairds.

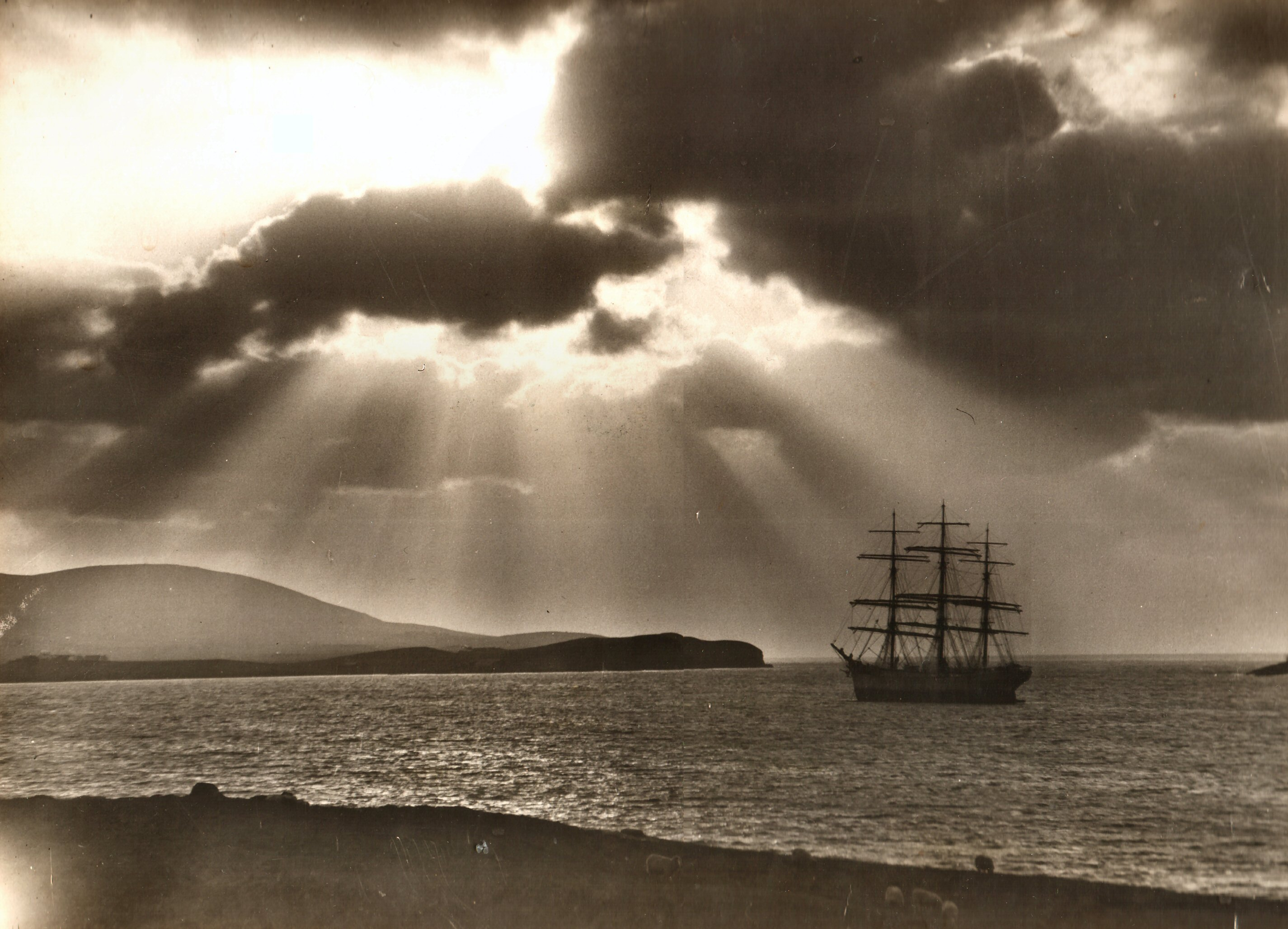
Full-rigged ship Maella, of Oslo, in Bressay Sound circa January 1922

British rule came at a price for many ordinary people as well as traders. The Shetlanders' nautical skills were sought by the Royal Navy: some 3,000 served during the Napoleonic Wars from 1800 to 1815 and press gangs were rife. During this period 120 men were taken from Fetlar alone and only 20 of them returned home. By the late 19th century 90% of all Shetland was owned by just 32 men, and between 1861 and 1881 more than 8,000 Shetlanders emigrated. With the passing of the Crofters' Act in 1886 the Liberal prime minister William Gladstone emancipated crofters from the rule of the landlords. The Act enabled those who had effectively been landowners' serfs to become owner-occupiers of their own small farms.

The Orcadian experience was somewhat different. An influx of Scottish entrepreneurs helped to create a diverse and independent community that included farmers, fishermen and merchants that called themselves comunitatis Orcadie and who proved themselves increasingly able to defend their rights against their feudal overlords. In the 17th century, Orcadians formed the overwhelming majority of employees of the Hudson's Bay Company in Canada. The harsh climate of Orkney and the Orcadian reputation for sobriety and their boat-handling skills made them ideal candidates for the rigours of the Canadian north. During this period, burning kelp briefly became a mainstay of the islands' economy. For example, on Shapinsay over 3,048 tonnes (3,000 long tons) of burned seaweed were produced per annum to make soda ash, bringing in £20,000 to the local economy. Agricultural improvements beginning in the 17th century coincided with the enclosure of the commons and in the Victorian era the emergence of large and well-managed farms using a five-shift rotation system and producing high-quality beef cattle. There is little evidence of an Orcadian fishing fleet until the 19th century but it grew rapidly and 700 boats were involved by the 1840s with Stronsay and then later Stromness becoming leading centres of development. (Note: Coull (2003) quotes the old saying that an Orcadian is a farmer with a boat, in contrast to a Shetlander, who is a fisherman with a croft.) Many Orcadian seamen became involved in whaling in Arctic waters during the 19th century, although the boats were generally based elsewhere in Britain.

=== World Wars ===
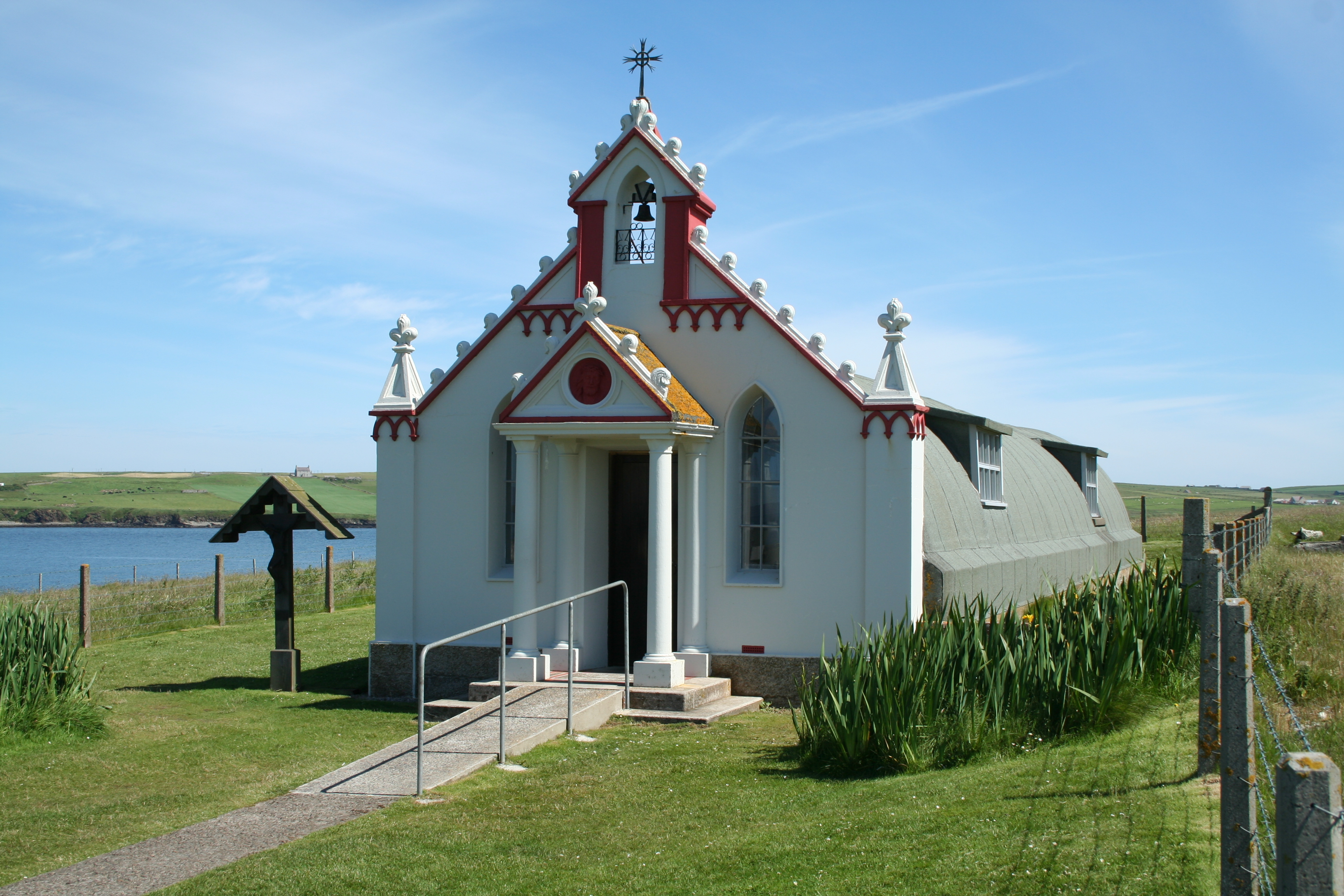
The Italian Chapel on Lamb Holm, built by POWs

Orkney was the site of a naval base at Scapa Flow, which played a major role in World War I. After the Armistice in 1918, the German High Seas Fleet was transferred in its entirety to Scapa Flow while a decision was to be made on its future; however, the German sailors opened the sea-cocks and scuttled all the ships. During World War I the 10th Cruiser Squadron was stationed at Swarbacks Minn in Shetland and during a single year from March 1917 more than 4,500 ships sailed from Lerwick as part of an escorted convoy system. In total, Shetland lost more than 500 men, a higher proportion than any other part of Britain, and there were waves of emigration in the 1920s and 1930s.

One month into World War II, the Royal Navy battleship HMS Royal Oak was sunk by a German U-boat at Scapa Flow. As a result, barriers were built to close most of the access channels; these had the advantage of creating causeways enabling travellers to go from island to island by road instead of being obliged to rely on ferries. The causeways were constructed by Italian prisoners of war, who also constructed the ornate Italian Chapel. The Scapa Flow base was neglected after the war, eventually closing in 1957.

During World War II, a Norwegian naval unit nicknamed the "Shetland Bus" was established by the Special Operations Executive in the autumn of 1940 with a base first at Lunna and later in Scalloway to conduct operations around the coast of Norway. About 30 fishing vessels used by Norwegian refugees were gathered, and the Shetland Bus conducted covert operations, carrying intelligence agents, refugees, instructors for the resistance, and military supplies. It made over 200 trips across the sea, with Leif Larsen, the most highly decorated allied naval officer of the war, making 52 of them.

The problem of a declining population was significant in the post-war years, although in the last decades of the 20th century there was a recovery and life in the islands focused on growing prosperity and the emergence of a relatively classless society.

== Modern times ==
=== Politics ===
Due to their history, the islands have a Norse, rather than a Gaelic flavour, and have historic links with the Faroes, Iceland, and Norway. The similarities of both geography and history are matched by some elements of the current political process. Both Orkney and Shetland are represented in the House of Commons as constituting the Orkney and Shetland constituency, which elects one Member of Parliament (MP), the current incumbent being Alistair Carmichael. Both are also within the Highlands and Islands electoral region for the Scottish Parliament.

In the 2014 Scottish independence referendum, 65.4% of the constituency's electors voted for Scotland to stay part of the United Kingdom.

However, there are also two separate constituencies that elect one Member of the Scottish Parliament each for Orkney and Shetland by the first past the post system. Orkney and Shetland also have separate local Councils which are both dominated by independents.

The Orkney Movement, a political party that supported devolution for Orkney from the rest of Scotland, contested the 1987 general election as the Orkney and Shetland Movement (a coalition of the Orkney movement and its equivalent for Shetland). Their candidate, John Goodlad, came 4th with 3,095 votes, 14.5% of those cast.

=== Transport ===
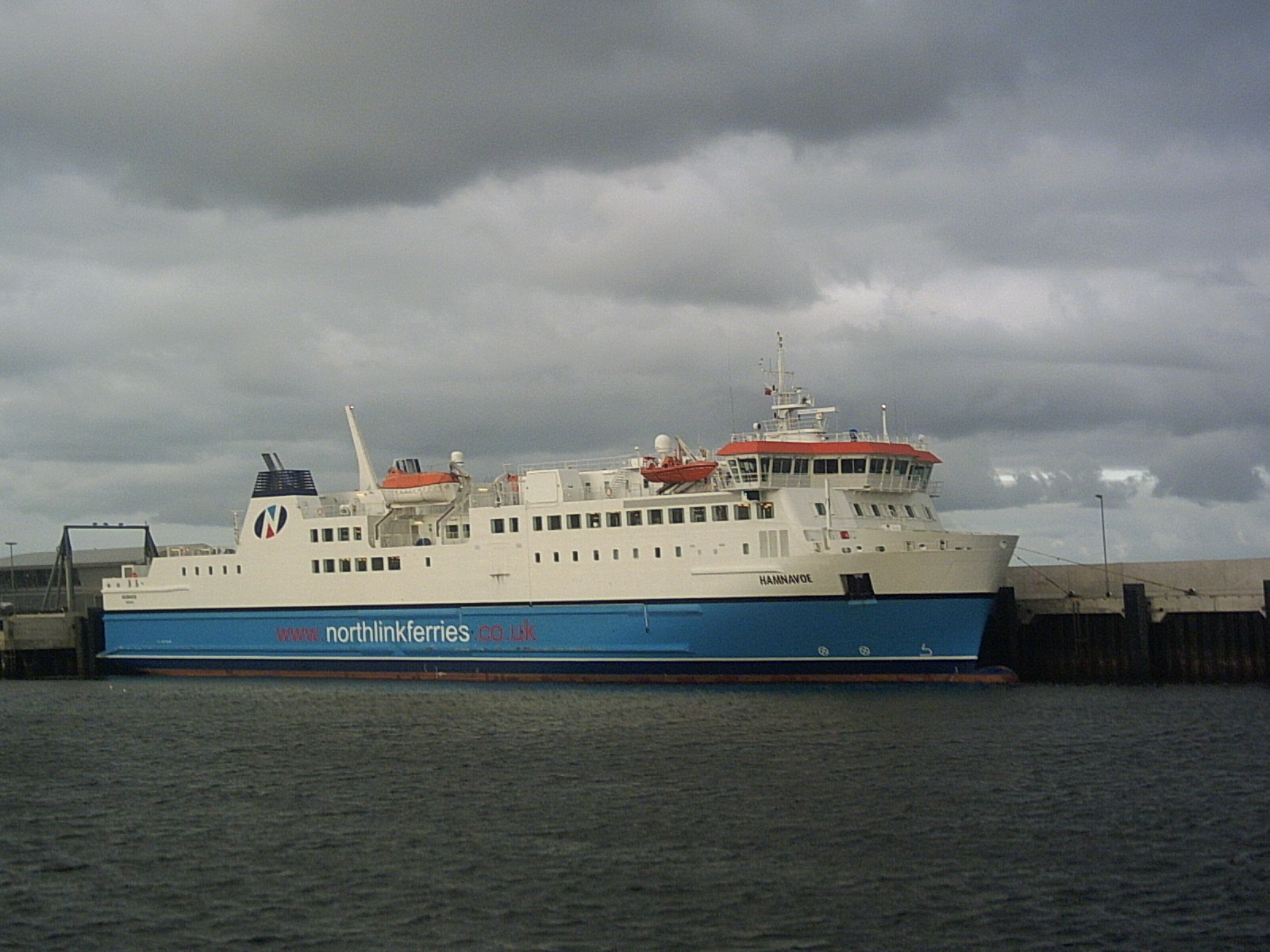
NorthLink Ferries MV Hamnavoe at Scrabster harbour

Ferry services link Orkney and Shetland to the rest of Scotland, the main routes being Scrabster harbour, Thurso to Stromness and Aberdeen to Lerwick, both operated by NorthLink Ferries. Inter-island ferry services are operated by Orkney Ferries and SIC Ferries, which are operated by the respective local authorities and Northlink also run a Lerwick to Kirkwall service. Automatic lighthouses are commonly sited across the islands as an aid to navigation at various locations.

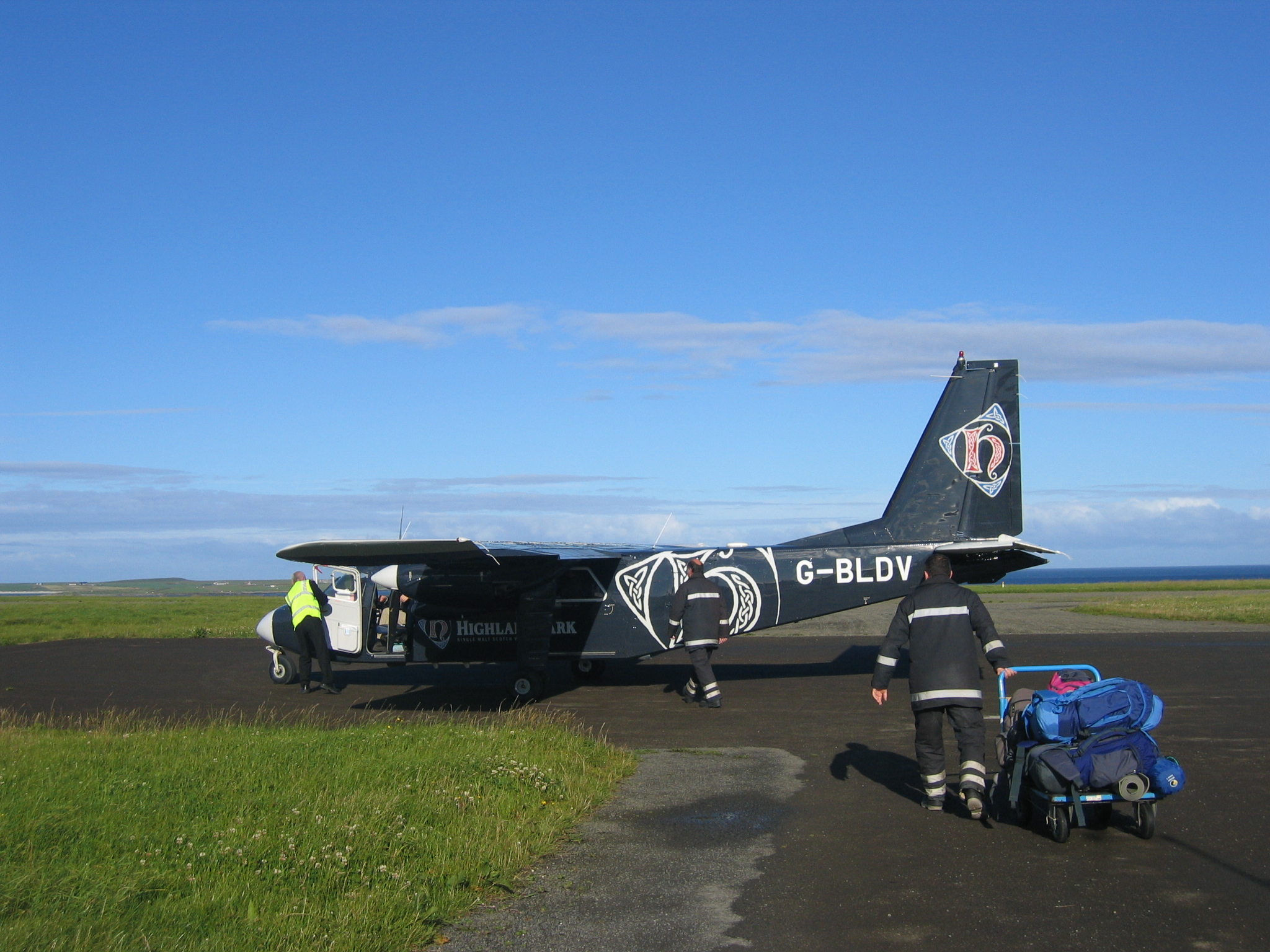
BN2 Islander being loaded with luggage at Papa Westray Airport

Kirkwall Airport serves as the sole commercial airport in Orkney, which is operated by Highland and Islands Airports. Loganair provides services to Aberdeen, Edinburgh, Glasgow and Inverness for both Kirkwall and Sumburgh Airport.

Inter-Island flights are available from Kirkwall to several Orkney islands and from the Shetland Mainland to most of the inhabited islands including those from Tingwall Airport. There are frequent charter flights from Aberdeen to Scatsta near Sullom Voe, which are used to transport oilfield workers and this small terminal has the fifth largest number of international passengers in Scotland. The scheduled air service between Westray and Papa Westray is reputedly the shortest in the world at two minutes' duration.

=== Economics ===
The very different geologies of the two archipelagos have resulted in dissimilar local economies. In Shetland, the main revenue producers are agriculture, aquaculture, fishing, renewable energy, the petroleum industry (offshore crude oil and natural gas production), the creative industries and tourism. Oil and gas was first landed at Sullom Voe in 1978, and it has subsequently become one of the largest oil terminals in Europe. Taxes from the oil have increased public sector spending in Shetland on social welfare, art, sport, environmental measures and financial development. Three-quarters of the islands' workforce is employed in the service sector and Shetland Islands Council alone accounted for 27.9% of output in 2003. Fishing remains central to the islands' economy today, with the total catch being 75,767 tonnes (74,570 long tons; 83,519 short tons) in 2009, valued at over £73.2 million.

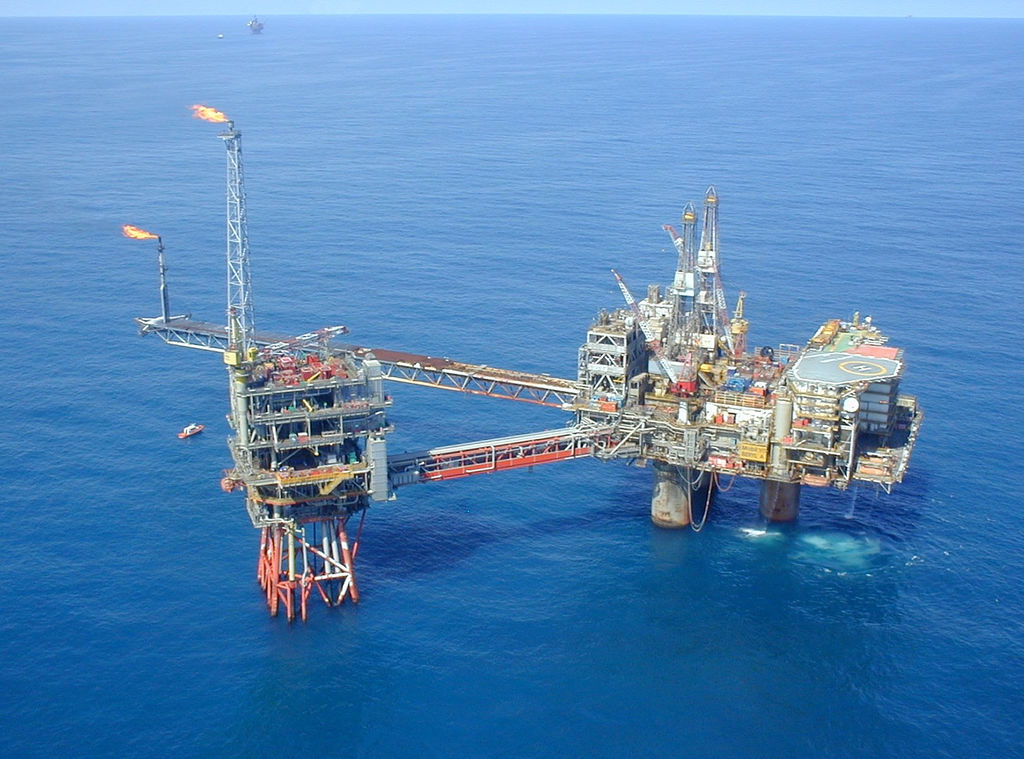
ExxonMobil's Beryl alpha oil platform in the East Shetland Basin

Orkney and Shetland have significant wind and marine energy resources, and renewable energy has recently come into prominence. The European Marine Energy Centre is a Scottish Government–backed research facility that has installed a wave testing system at Billia Croo on the Orkney Mainland and a tidal power testing station on the island of Eday. This has been described as "the first of its kind in the world set up to provide developers of wave and tidal energy devices with a purpose-built performance testing facility." Billia Croo also houses an experimental underwater data center run by Microsoft.

=== Culture ===
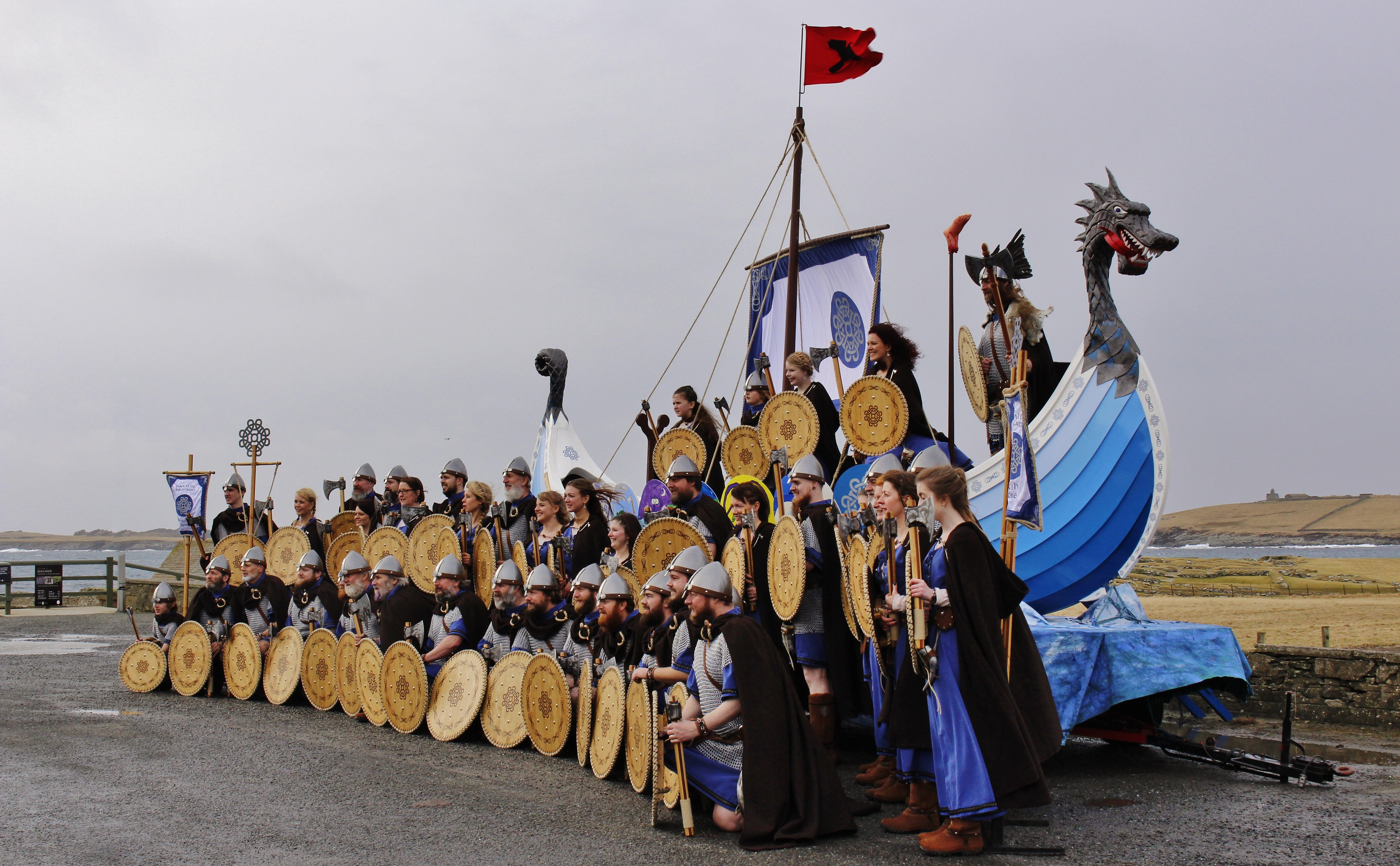
Jarl squad for the South Mainland Up Helly Aa, one of several of Shetland's Viking fire festivals.

The Northern Isles have a rich source of folklore. There are many Orcadian tales concerning trows, a form of troll that draws on the islands' Scandinavian connections. Local customs in the past included marriage ceremonies at the Odin Stone that forms part of the Stones of Stenness. The best known literary figures from modern Orkney are the poet Edwin Muir, the poet and novelist George Mackay Brown and the novelist Eric Linklater.

Shetland has a strong tradition of local music. The Forty Fiddlers was formed in the 1950s to promote the traditional fiddle style, which is a vibrant part of local culture today. Notable exponents of Shetland folk music include Aly Bain and the late Tom Anderson and Peerie Willie Johnson. Thomas Fraser was a country musician who never released a commercial recording during his life, but whose work has become popular more than 20 years after his untimely death in 1978.

=== Language ===
The Norn language, formerly spoken in the islands, is descendant of Old Norse brought by the Vikings in the 9th century. Since 1468-1469, after Orkney and Shetland were absorbed by the Kingdom of Scotland, Norn gradually began to fade as the influx of Scots-speaking settlers migrated to the islands. Norn as such became an extinct language around 1850, after the death of its last-known speaker Walter Sutherland. The local dialects of the Scots language, collectively known as Insular Scots, are distinctive and retain strong Nordic influences.

== Main settlements ==
The main centres of population in the Orkney and Shetland islands as of 2020, with populations of over 500
Settlement	Island	Population	Area (km^{2})	Old Norse name	Picture
Kirkwall	Mainland, Orkney	10,020	4.01	Kirkjuvágr	
Lerwick	Mainland, Shetland	6,760	3.15	Leirvik	
Stromness	Mainland, Orkney	2,490	1.21	Straumnes	
Scalloway	Mainland, Shetland	1,170		Skálivágr	
Symbister	Whalsay, Shetland	797		Sunnbólstaðr	
Brae	Mainland, Shetland	750		Breiðeið	Brae,_the_marina_from_the_east_-_geograph.org.uk_-_2742231
St Margaret's Hope	South Ronaldsay, Orkney	600	0.42	Hjop	St_Margaret's_Hope_-_geograph.org.uk_-_2047202
Pierowall	Westray, Orkney	570		Hofn	The_bay_at_Pierowall_-_geograph.org.uk_-_405236
Finstown	Mainland, Orkney	550		Fjörðr	Finstown,_view_across_the_bay_-_geograph.org.uk_-_2631321

== Island names ==
The etymology of the island names is dominated by Norse influence. There follows a listing of the derivation of all the inhabited islands in the Northern Isles.

=== Shetland ===
The oldest mention of a name related to "Shetland" is a derived Latin adjective, Hetlandensis, recorded in 1190 becoming Hetland in 1431 after various intermediate transformations. This then became Hjaltland in the 16th century. As Shetland's Norn was gradually replaced by Scots Hjaltland became Ȝetland. When use of the letter yogh was discontinued, it was often replaced by the similar-looking letter z, hence Zetland, the mispronounced form used to describe the pre-1975 county council. However the earlier name is Innse Chat – the island of the cats (or the cat tribe) as referred to in early Irish literature and it is just possible that this forms part of the Norse name. The Cat tribe also occupied parts of the northern Scottish mainland – hence the name of Caithness via the Norse Katanes ("headland of the cat"), and the Gaelic name for Sutherland, Cataibh, meaning "among the Cats".

The location of "Thule", first mentioned by Pytheas of Massilia when he visited Britain sometime between 322 and 285 BC is not known for certain. When Tacitus mentioned it in AD 98 it is clear he was referring to Shetland.

Island	Derivation	Language	Meaning	Alternatives
Bressay	Breiðøy	Norse	broad island	
Bruray		Norse	east isle	Norse: bruarøy – "bridge island"
East Burra		Scots/Norse	east broch island	
Fair Isle	Frioarøy	Norse	fair island	Norse: feoerøy – "far-off isle".
Fetlar	Unknown	Pre-Celtic?	Unknown	Norse: fetill – "shoulder-straps" or "fat land". See also Funzie Girt.
Foula	Fugløy	Norse	bird island	
Housay	Húsøy	Norse	house isle	
Shetland Mainland	Possibly hjalt + land	Norse/ Gaelic	island of the cat people?	Perhaps originally from Gaelic: Innse Chat – see above
Muckle Roe	Rauðey Mikla	Scots/Norse	big red island	
Papa Stour	Papøy Stóra	Celtic/Norse	big island of the priests	
Trondra		Norse	boar island	Norse: "Þrondr's isle" or "Þraendir's isle". The first is a personal name, the second a tribal name from the Trondheim area.
Unst	Unknown	Pre-Celtic?	Unknown	Norse: omstr – "corn-stack" or ørn-vist – "home of the eagle"
Vaila	Valøy	Norse	falcon island	Norse: "horse island", "battlefield island" or "round island"
West Burra		Scots/Norse	west broch island	
Whalsay	Hvalsey	Norse	whale island	
Yell	Unknown	Pre-Celtic?	Unknown	Norse: í Ála – "deep furrow" or Jala – "white island"

=== Orkney ===
Pytheas described Great Britain as being triangular in shape, with a northern tip called Orcas. This may have referred to Dunnet Head, from which Orkney is visible. Writing in the 1st century AD, the Roman geographer Pomponius Mela called the Orkney islands Orcades, as did Tacitus in AD 98 "Orc" is usually interpreted as a Pictish tribal name meaning "young pig" or "young boar". The old Irish Gaelic name for the islands was Insi Orc ("island of the pigs"). (Note: The proto-Celtic root *φorko-, can mean either pig or salmon, thus giving an alternative of "island(s) of (the) salmon".) The ogham script on the Buckquoy spindle-whorl is also cited as evidence for the pre-Norse existence of Old Irish in Orkney. The Pictish association with Orkney is lent weight by the Norse name for the Pentland Firth – Pettaland-fjörðr i.e "Pictland Firth".

The Norse retained the earlier root but changed the meaning, providing the only definite example of an adaption of a pre-Norse place name in the Northern Isles. The islands became Orkneyar meaning "seal islands". An alternative name for Orkney is recorded in 1300—Hrossey, meaning "horse isle" and this may also contain a Pictish element of ros meaning "moor" or "plain".

Unlike most of the larger Orkney islands, the derivation of the name "Shapinsay" is not obvious. The final 'ay' is from the Old Norse for island, but the first two syllables are more difficult to interpret. Haswell-Smith (2004) suggests the root may be hjalpandis-øy (helpful island) due to the presence of a good harbour, although anchorages are plentiful in the archipelago. The first written record dates from 1375 in a reference to Scalpandisay, which may suggest a derivation from "judge's island". Another suggestion is "Hyalpandi's island", although no one of that name is known to have been associated with Shapinsay.

Island	Derivation	Language	Meaning	Alternatives
Auskerry	Østr sker	Norse	east skerry	
Burray	Borgrøy	Norse	broch island	
Eday	Eidøy	Norse	isthmus island	
Egilsay	Égillsey	Norse or Gaelic	Egil's island	Possibly from Gaelic eaglais – church island
Flotta	Flottøy	Norse	flat, grassy isle	
Gairsay	Gáreksøy	Norse	Gárekr's isle	
Graemsay	Grims-øy	Norse	Grim's island	
Holm of Grimbister		Norse	Small and rounded islet of Grim's farm	
Hoy	Háøy	Norse	high island	
Inner Holm		English/Norse	inner rounded islet	
North Ronaldsay	Rinansøy	Norse	Uncertain – possibly "Ringa's isle"	
Orkney Mainland	Orcades	Various	isle(s) of the young pig	See above
Papa Stronsay	Papey Minni	Norse	priest isle of Stronsay	The Norse name is literally "little priest isle"
Papa Westray	Papey Meiri	Norse	priest isle of Westray	The Norse name is literally "big priest isle"
Rousay	Hrólfsøy	Norse	Hrólfs island	
Sanday	Sandøy	Norse	sand island	
Shapinsay		Unknown	Possibly "helpful island"	See above
South Ronaldsay	Rognvaldsey	Norse	Rognvald's island	
South Walls	Sooth Was	Scots/Norse	"southern voes"	"Voe" means fjord. Possibly "south bays".
Stronsay	Possibly Strjónsøy	Norse	good fishing and farming island	
Westray	Vestrøy	Norse	western island	
Wyre	Vigr	Norse	spear-like island	

=== Uninhabited islands ===
Stroma, from the Norse Straumøy means "current island" or "island in the tidal stream", a reference to the strong currents in the Pentland Firth. The Norse often gave animal names to islands, and these have been transferred into English in, for example, the Calf of Flotta and Horse of Copinsay. Brother Isle is an anglicisation of the Norse breiðareøy meaning "broad beach island". The Norse holmr, meaning "a small islet" has become "Holm" in English and there are numerous examples of this use including Corn Holm, Thieves Holm and Little Holm. "Muckle" meaning large or big is one of few Scots words in the island names of the Nordreyar and appears in Muckle Roe and Muckle Flugga in Shetland and Muckle Green Holm and Muckle Skerry in Orkney. Many small islets and skerries have Scots or Insular Scots names such as Da Skerries o da Rokness and Da Buddle Stane in Shetland, and Kirk Rocks in Orkney.

== See also ==
- Kingdom of the Isles
