= Norn language =

Extinct Germanic language spoken in the Northern Isles of Scotland

Norn
- norn
- Native to: Scotland
- Region: Northern Isles and Caithness
- Extinct: c. 1850, with the death of Walter Sutherland possibly after 1932
- Language family: Indo-European: Germanic; North Germanic; West Scandinavian; Insular Scandinavian; Norn
- Early forms: Old Norse: Old West Norse
- Writing system: Younger Futhark (original); Old Norse alphabet

Language codes
- ISO 639-3: nrn
- Glottolog: oldn1246
- Linguasphere: 52-AAA-ac
- Languages of Scotland around the early 15th century, based on placename evidence Norn Scottish Gaelic Scots

Norn is an extinct North Germanic language that was spoken in the Northern Isles (Orkney and Shetland) off the north coast of mainland Scotland and in Caithness in the far north of the Scottish mainland. After Orkney and Shetland were pledged to Scotland by Norway in 1468–69, it was gradually replaced by Scots. Norn is thought to have become extinct around 1850, after the death of Walter Sutherland, the language's last known speaker, though there are claims the language persisted as late as 1932.

== History ==
Norse Scottish island possessions in the 11th century

Norse settlement in the islands probably began in the early 9th century. These settlers are believed to have arrived in very substantial numbers, and like those who migrated to Iceland and the Faroe Islands, it is probable that most came from the west coast of Norway. Shetland toponymy bears some resemblance to that of northwest Norway, while Norn vocabulary implies links with more southerly Norwegian regions.

Orkney and Shetland were pledged to James III in 1468 and 1469 respectively, and it is with these pledges that the replacement of Norn with Scots is most associated. However, the decline of Norse speech in Orkney probably began in 1379 when the Earldom of Orkney, covering all of the Northern Isles, passed into the hands of Henry Sinclair, of Clan Sinclair. Scots had superseded Norse as the language of prestige on Orkney by the early 15th century.

In Shetland, the transition began later, but by the end of the 15th century both island groups were bilingual. Despite this, the process by which Scots overtook Norn as the primary spoken language on the islands was not a swift one, and most natives of Orkney and Shetland probably spoke Norn as a first language until the late 16th and early-to-mid 17th centuries respectively. One of the last documents written in Norn was for a 1597 mortgage issued over a property belonging to Else, sister of Anna Throndsen, who had married a Shetland man Andrew Mowat of Heogoland in Eshaness.

=== Extinction ===
It is not known exactly when Norn became extinct. Sources from the 17th and 18th centuries speak of Norn (sometimes identified as "Norse", "Norwegian" or "Danish") as being in a state of decline and generally indicate that the language remained stronger in Shetland than in Orkney. A source from 1670 states that there are "only three or four parishes" in Orkney where people speak "Noords or rude Danish" and that they do so "chiefly when they are at their own houses". Another from 1701 indicates that there were still a few monoglot "Norse" speakers who were capable of speaking "no other thing", and notes that there were more speakers of the language in Shetland than in Orkney. It was said in 1703 that the people of Shetland generally spoke a Lowland Scots dialect brought to Shetland from the end of the fifteenth century by settlers from Fife and Lothian, but that "many among them retain the ancient Danish Language"; while in 1750 Orkney-born James Mackenzie wrote that Norn was not yet entirely extinct, being "retained by old people", who still spoke it among each other.

The last reports of Norn speakers are claimed to be from the 19th century, with some claims of a very limited use until the early 20th century, but it is more likely that the language was dying out in the late 18th century. The isolated islands of Foula and Unst are variously claimed as the last refuges of the language in Shetland, where there were people "who could repeat sentences in Norn", probably passages from folk songs or poems, as late as 1894. Walter Sutherland from Skaw in Unst, who died about 1850, has been cited as the last native speaker of the Norn language. However, fragments of vocabulary survived the death of the main language and remain to this day, mainly in place-names and terms referring to nature, mood, and fishing. For example, 'vae'/'voe' (an inlet or small bay) are found in some English dictionaries and are legal words in Scrabble.

Norn had also been a spoken language in Caithness but had probably become extinct there by the 15th century, replaced by Scots. Hence, some scholars also speak about "Caithness Norn", but others avoid this. Even less is known about "Caithness Norn" than about Orkney and Shetland Norn. Almost no written Norn has survived, but what little remains includes a version of the Lord's Prayer and a ballad, "Hildina". Michael P Barnes, professor of Scandinavian Studies at University College London, has published a study, The Norn Language of Orkney and Shetland.

Songs in Norn survived in the oral tradition long enough to be recorded. In the 1940s and 1950s, John Stickle of Unst and Kitty Anderson of Lerwick were recorded singing versions of the 'Unst Boat Song' in Norn and the ballad of Orfeo with a Norn refrain.

== Modern use ==
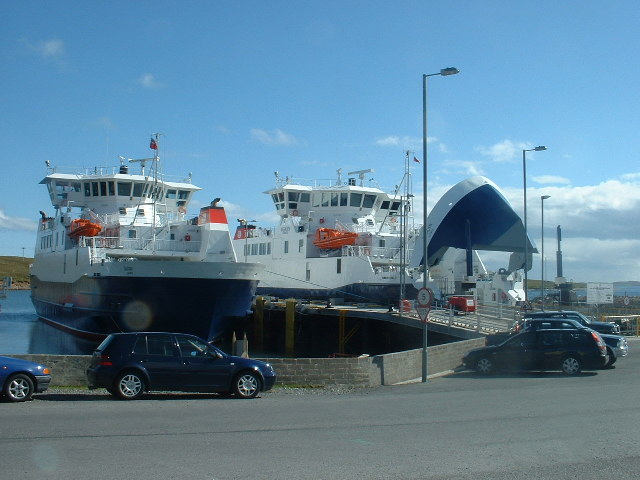
Daggri and Dagalien at Ulsta, Yell, Shetland

Most of the use of Norn/Norse in modern-day Shetland and Orkney is purely ceremonial, and mostly in Old Norse, for example the Shetland motto, Með lögum skal land byggja 'with law shall land be built', which is the same motto used by the Icelandic police force and inspired by the medieval Norwegian Frostathing Law.

Another example of the use of Norse/Norn in the Northern Isles can be found in the names of ferries:

- NorthLink Ferries has ships named MV Hamnavoe (after the old name for Stromness), and MV Hjaltland (Shetland) and MV Hrossey ('horse island', an old name for Mainland, Orkney).
- The Yell Sound Ferry sails from Ulsta on the island to Toft on the Shetland Mainland. The service is operated by two ferries, Daggri (Norse for 'dawn'), launched in 2003 and Dagalien (Norse for 'dusk'), launched in 2004.

Norn words are still used to describe many of the colour and pattern variations in the native sheep of Shetland and Orkney, which survive as the Shetland and North Ronaldsay breeds. Icelandic uses similar words for many of the same colour variations in Icelandic sheep.

There are some enthusiasts who are engaged in developing and disseminating a modern form called Nynorn ("New Norn"), based upon linguistic analysis of the known records and Norse linguistics in general.

In 2022 at the Glasgow Royal Concert Hall, as part of the Shetland 550 concert celebrating the 550th anniversary of Shetland becoming Scottish, singer Inge Thompson sang a rendition of a song in Norn.

In 2023 the singer Siobhan Wilson released a song featuring the Norn language.

== Classification ==
Norn is an Indo-European language belonging to the North Germanic branch of the Germanic languages. Together with Faroese, Icelandic and Norwegian, it belongs to the West Scandinavian group, separating it from the East Scandinavian and Gutnish groups consisting of Swedish, Danish and Gutnish.

While this classification is based on the differences between the North Germanic languages at the time they split, their present-day characteristics justify another classification, dividing them into Insular Scandinavian and Mainland Scandinavian language groups based on mutual intelligibility. Under this system, Norwegian is grouped together with Danish and Swedish because the last millennium has seen all three undergo important changes, especially in grammar and lexis, which have set them apart from Faroese and Icelandic.

Norn is generally considered to have been fairly similar to Faroese, sharing many phonological and grammatical traits, and might even have been mutually intelligible with it. Thus, it can be considered an Insular Scandinavian language.

Few written texts remain. It is distinct from the present-day Shetland dialect, which evolved from Middle English.

== Phonology ==
The phonology of Norn can never be determined with much precision because of the lack of source material, but the general aspects can be extrapolated from the few written sources that exist. Norn shared many traits with the dialects of southwest Norway. That includes a voicing of /p, t, k/ to [b, d, ɡ] after vowels and (in the Shetland dialect but only partially in the Orkney dialect) a conversion of /θ/ and /ð/ ("thing" and "that" respectively) to [t] and [d] respectively.

== Morphology ==
Norn grammar had features very similar to the other Scandinavian languages. There were two numbers, three genders and four cases (nominative, accusative, genitive and dative). The two main conjugations of verbs in present and past tense were also present. Like all other North Germanic languages (except West and South Jutlandic), it used a suffix instead of a prepositioned article to indicate definiteness as in modern Scandinavian: man(n) ("man"); mannen ("the man"). Though it is difficult to be certain of many of the aspects of Norn grammar, documents indicate that it may have featured subjectless clauses, which were common in the West Scandinavian languages.

== Sample text ==
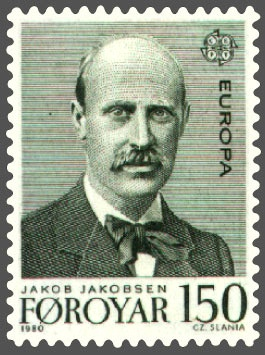
Jakob Jakobsen was a Faroese linguist and leading documentarist of Norn.

The following are Norn, Old Norse and contemporary Scandinavian versions of the Lord's Prayer:

- Orkney Norn:

Fa vor i ir i chimrie, / Helleur ir i nam thite,
gilla cosdum thite cumma, / veya thine mota vara gort
o yurn sinna gort i chimrie, / ga vus da on da dalight brow vora
Firgive vus sinna vora / sin vee Firgive sindara mutha vus,
lyv vus ye i tumtation, / min delivera vus fro olt ilt.
Amen.

- Shetland (Foula) Norn: ^{:104}

Fy vor or er i Chimeri. / Halaght vara nam dit.
La Konungdum din cumma. / La vill din vera guerde
i vrildin sindaeri chimeri. / Gav vus dagh u dagloght brau.
Forgive sindorwara / sin vi forgiva gem ao sinda gainst wus.
Lia wus ikè o vera tempa, / but delivra wus fro adlu idlu.
[For do i ir Kongungdum, u puri, u glori.] Amen.

- Old West Norse:

Faþer vár es ert í himenríki, / verði nafn þitt hæilagt
Til kome ríke þitt, / værði vili þin
sva a iarðu sem í himnum. / Gef oss í dag brauð vort dagligt
Ok fyr gefþu oss synþer órar, / sem vér fyr gefom þeim er viþ oss hafa misgert
Leiðd oss eigi í freistni, / heldr leys þv oss frá ollu illu.
Amen.

- Faroese

Faðir vár, tú sum ert í himlinum. / Heilagt verði navnið títt.
Komi ríkið títt. / Verði vilji tín,
so sum á himli, so á jørð. / Gev okkum í dag okkara dagliga breyð.
Fyrigev okkum syndir okkara, / so sum vit eisini fyrigeva teimum, ið móti okkum synda.
Leið okkum ikki í freistingar, / men frels okkum frá tí illa.
[Tí at títt er ríkið, valdið og heiðurin um aldur og allar ævir.] Amen.

- Icelandic

Faðir vor, þú sem ert á himnum. / Helgist þitt nafn,
til komi þitt ríki, / verði þinn vilji,
svo á jörðu sem á himni. / Gef oss í dag vort daglegt brauð.
Fyrirgef oss vorar skuldir, / svo sem vér og fyrirgefum vorum skuldunautum.
Og eigi leið þú oss í freistni, / heldur frelsa oss frá illu.
[Því að þitt er ríkið, mátturinn og dýrðin að eilífu.] Amen.

- Norwegian (Landsmål 1920, present-day Nynorsk)

Fader vår, du som er i himmelen! / Lat namnet ditt helgast;
lat riket ditt koma; / lat viljen din råda på jordi som i himmelen;
gjev oss i dag vårt daglege brød; / og forlat oss vår skuld, som me òg forlet våre skuldmenn;
og før oss ikkje ut i freisting; / men frels oss frå det vonde.
For riket er ditt, og magti og æra i all æva! Amen

- Swedish

Fader vår, du som är i himmelen / helgat vare ditt namn.
Tillkomme ditt rike/ ske din vilja såsom i himmelen så ock på jorden.
Vårt dagliga bröd giv oss idag / och förlåt oss våra skulder,
såsom ock vi förlåta dem oss skyldiga äro,
och inled oss icke i frestelse / utan fräls oss ifrån ondo.
Ty riket är ditt, och makten och härligheten i evighet! Amen.

- Danish

Vor fader, du som er i himlene / helliget blive dit navn.
Komme dit rige / ske din vilje
som i himlen således også på jorden / giv os i dag vort daglige brød,
Og forlad os vor skyld / som også vi forlader vore skyldnere,
Og led os ikke ind i fristelse / men fri os fra det onde.
For dit er riget og magten og æren i evighed! Amen.

A Shetland "guddick" (riddle) in Norn, which Jakob Jakobsen heard told on Unst, the northernmost island in Shetland, in the 1890s. The same riddle is also known from the Faroe Islands, Norway, and Iceland, and a variation also occurs in England.

Unst Norn (Jakob Jakobsen) : Førə hoŋgə, førə gɔŋgə, førə stad əpo skø̄, twa vɩstrə vegəbi and en comes atə drɩᶅandɩ.	Faroese Fýra hanga, fýra ganga, Fýra standa uppí ský Tvey vísa veg á bø Og ein darlar aftast	Icelandic Fjórir hanga, fjórir ganga, Tveir veg vísa, Tveir fyrir hundum verja Einn eftir drallar, sá er oftast saurugur
Orcadian dialect of Scots (not Norn) Foweer hing-hangers, An’fower ching-changers, [line missing] An’ een comes dinglan efter	English translation Four hang, four walk, Two stand skyward, Two show the way to the field And one comes shaking behind	Traditional version from England Four dilly danders Four upstanders Two lookers Two crookers And a wig-wag

The answer is a cow: four teats hang, four legs walk, two horns and two ears stand skyward, two eyes show the way to the field and one tail comes shaking (dangling) behind.

== See also ==
- Udal law, the Norse law system of the Northern Isles.
