= MV Cemfjord =

Cargo ship sunk near the Orkney Islands, Scotland

Coordinates: 58.7175°N 3.0994°W

History

Cyprus
- Name: Margareta (1984–2004); Cemfjord (2004–15)
- Owner: Thekla Schepers KG, Haren (1984–95); Shark Shipping Co, NV, Willemstad (1995–2008); Arouno Shipping Co Ltd, Limassol (2008–15)
- Operator: Margareta & Co, Haren (1984–95); Brise Bereederungs GmbH & Co KG, Hamburg (1995–2015)
- Port of registry: Haren, West Germany (1984–89); Haren, Germany (1989–2008); Limassol, Cyprus (2008–15)
- Builder: Detlef Hegemann Rolandwerft, Bremen
- Yard number: 126
- Laid down: 15 February 1984
- Launched: 31 August 1984
- Completed: November 1984
- Out of service: 2 January 2015
- Identification: IMO number: 8403569; Callsign DCOG (1984–2008), P3ZG9 (2008–15)
- Fate: Sank with all hands lost

General characteristics
- Tonnage: 1,850 GT; 2,327 DWT; 661 NT
- Length: 83.13 metres (272 ft 9 in) overall
- Beam: 11.34 metres (37 ft 2 in)
- Height: 21.00 metres (68 ft 11 in)
- Draught: 4.40 metres (14 ft 5 in)
- Installed power: Klöckner-Humboldt-Deutz SBV 6M 628 diesel engine, 1,175 kilowatts (1,576 hp) @ 90rpm; bow thruster 136 kilowatts (182 hp)
- Propulsion: Screw propeller
- Speed: 10 knots (19 km/h)
- Capacity: 72 twenty-foot equivalent unit (1984–2008)
- Crew: 8

The Cemfjord was a Cyprus-registered cargo ship which foundered in the Pentland Firth off the north-east coast of Scotland on 2 January 2015. Built as the general cargo ship Margareta in 1984, she was converted to carry cement in 1998. She was en route from Aalborg, Denmark to Runcorn, Cheshire, United Kingdom in January 2015 when she capsized in bad weather and sank in 82 metres (270 ft) of water. All eight crew were presumed lost. No bodies were recovered, and the ship has been left as a sea grave.

== Description ==
The ship was 83.13 metres (272 ft 9 in) long overall, with a beam of 11.34 metres (37 ft 2 in). She had a draught of 4.40 metres (14 ft 5 in) and a height of 21.00 metres (68 ft 11 in). The ship was assessed at 1,850 GT, 2,327 DWT, 661 NT.

She was powered by a Klöckner-Humboldt-Deutz 6M 628 diesel engine which produced 1,175 kilowatts (1,576 hp) at 790 rpm. The engine was a four-stroke engine with six cylinders of 240 mm diameter by 280 mm stroke. It drove a screw propeller, which could propel her at 10 knots (19 km/h). The ship was also equipped with a 136-kilowatt (182-horsepower) bow thruster.

== History ==
The ship was built as yard number 126 by Detlef Hegemann Rolandwerft GmbH, Bremen, West Germany. Her keel was laid on 15 February 1984 and she was launched as the general cargo ship Margareta on 31 August. Completion was in November 1984. She was allocated the IMO number 8403569. Her call sign was DCOG. She had a cargo capacity of 72 twenty-foot equivalent unit. Margareta was built for Thekla Schepers KG and operated under the management of MS Margareta & Co, Haren, West Germany. In May 1995 she was sold to the Margareta – Shark Shipping Co NV, Willemstad, Netherlands Antilles and placed under the management of Briese Schiffahrts GMBH & Co KG, Bremen, Germany.

In June 1998, she was converted to a cement carrier by Morska Stocznia Remontowa S.A., Świnoujście, Poland. Pneumatic equipment was installed which enabled her to self load and self discharge. She was allocated the call sign P3ZG9. She was owned by Partenreederei Baltic Sun and operated by Brise Bereederungs GmbH, Hamburg, Germany.

Following an inspection at Runcorn, Cheshire, on 15 December 2013, Cemfjord was detained due to deficiencies found. The launch apparatus for her lifeboats was inoperative and her safety management did not meet the required standard. There were nine other deficiencies of a lesser nature. She was released from detention on 18 December 2013.

At 22:14 on 29 July 2014, Cemfjord ran aground in the Kattegat off Læsø, Denmark. The authorities were contacted at 01:47 on 30 July and the ship was refloated later that day. Her Russian captain was subsequently convicted of being drunk in charge of the vessel. He was fined DKK 10,000 by a Danish court. A new Polish captain was appointed to take charge of the ship. In August 2014, a second Russian captain in command of Cemfjord was convicted by a court in Stavanger, Norway. The court sentenced him to 35 days' imprisonment for steering his ship while being intoxicated, and banned him from being in charge of a ship in Norwegian waters for two years.

=== Sinking ===
On her last voyage, Cemfjord was carrying 2,000 tonnes of cement from Aalborg in Denmark to Runcorn in Cheshire and was due to arrive on 5 January 2015. She was last sighted at 13:00 on 2 January 2015 in the Pentland Firth. At 14:30 on 3 January, her upturned hull was sighted eleven nautical miles (20 km) east of the Pentland Skerries by the NorthLink ferry Hrossey, which was sailing from Shetland to Aberdeen. Only the bow was visible above the waves. The ferry searched for survivors for two-and-a-half hours pending the arrival of lifeboats. No distress call had been received and the weather at the time was bad, with storm-force winds. There was no trace of her eight crew, comprising seven Poles and a Filipino. Lifeboats were launched from Longhope, Scrabster, Stromness and Wick. Two helicopters and an aircraft also joined the search for the missing crew members, as did HMS Somerset. By mid-afternoon on 4 January, the ship had sunk entirely.

The Marine Accident Investigation Branch (MAIB) conducted an investigation into the sinking. An MAIB underwater survey located the vessel on the seabed at a depth of around 82 metres (270 ft), twelve miles (19 km) east of Muckle Skerry. The wreck was found to be intact but inverted and resting on its superstructure; no evidence was observed of structural failure. It is thought that the Cemfjord may have been overwhelmed so quickly by bad weather that the crew did not have time to evacuate. The MAIB investigation concluded that the ship "capsized in extraordinarily violent sea conditions caused by gale-force winds and a strong, opposing tidal stream. Such conditions are commonly experienced within the Pentland Firth, were predictable and could have been avoided by effective passage planning. The master's decision to take Cemfjord into the Pentland Firth at that time was probably influenced by actual or perceived commercial pressures and his personal determination to succeed." According to the MAIB, the Cemfjord also suffered from "significant safety deficiencies relating to its rescue boat launching arrangements and bilge pumping system in the void spaces beneath the cement cargo holds. Both shortcomings were subject to Flag State [Cyprus] approved exemptions from safety regulations; however, the exemption regarding the rescue boat was not applicable to the equipment on board. This resulted from misunderstandings caused by the imprecise nature of the communication between the vessel's managers, the Flag State and the Flag State's recognised organisation."

No bodies were seen or recovered during the survey or subsequently. The ship's manager, Brise of Hamburg, has said that no attempt to raise the wreck would be made and it will be left as a sea grave.

Less than two months prior to her sinking, on 7 October 2014, Cemfjord was left with a list in the Pentland Firth, after her cargo shifted. The list was corrected by ballasting the ship. Contrary to regulations, the incident was not reported to the MAIB, although an internal investigation was carried out by Brise, the ship's managers.
