= Steven of Wick =

Steven of Wick, also known as D. Steven & Son, is a Scottish transport company founded in 1920 in the town of Wick, Scotland. It primarily transports seafood.

The company began in 1920 in the town of Wick in Scotland. They began with a horse and cart at Wick harbour where they still have a depot today. The town where the company originated, Wick, was once the biggest fishing port in the world. Steven of Wick did not start in the fish business; they started in the farming business.

Steven of Wick was in competition with Hendry of Wick. They were both two of Scotland's oldest hauliers to date. Hendry of Wick also had their depot at the Wick harbour. Their competition that went on for decades.

In the 1990s Steven of Wick bought out Hendry of Wick adding to their fleet.

Steven of Wick is mostly known to many as D. Steven & Son. They now have four depots; their smallest one is actually in Wick. Their biggest one is Scrabster about 45 minutes from Wick, and also one in Glasgow and Aberdeen. D. Steven & Son now transports goods around the UK and Europe. D. Steven & Sons' fleet consists of nearly 40 HGVs. In 2003, they were named Scottish European Haulier of the year and, in 2012, Scotland's Top Trailer fleet.
