= Inner Holm =

Island of the Orkney islands, Scotland

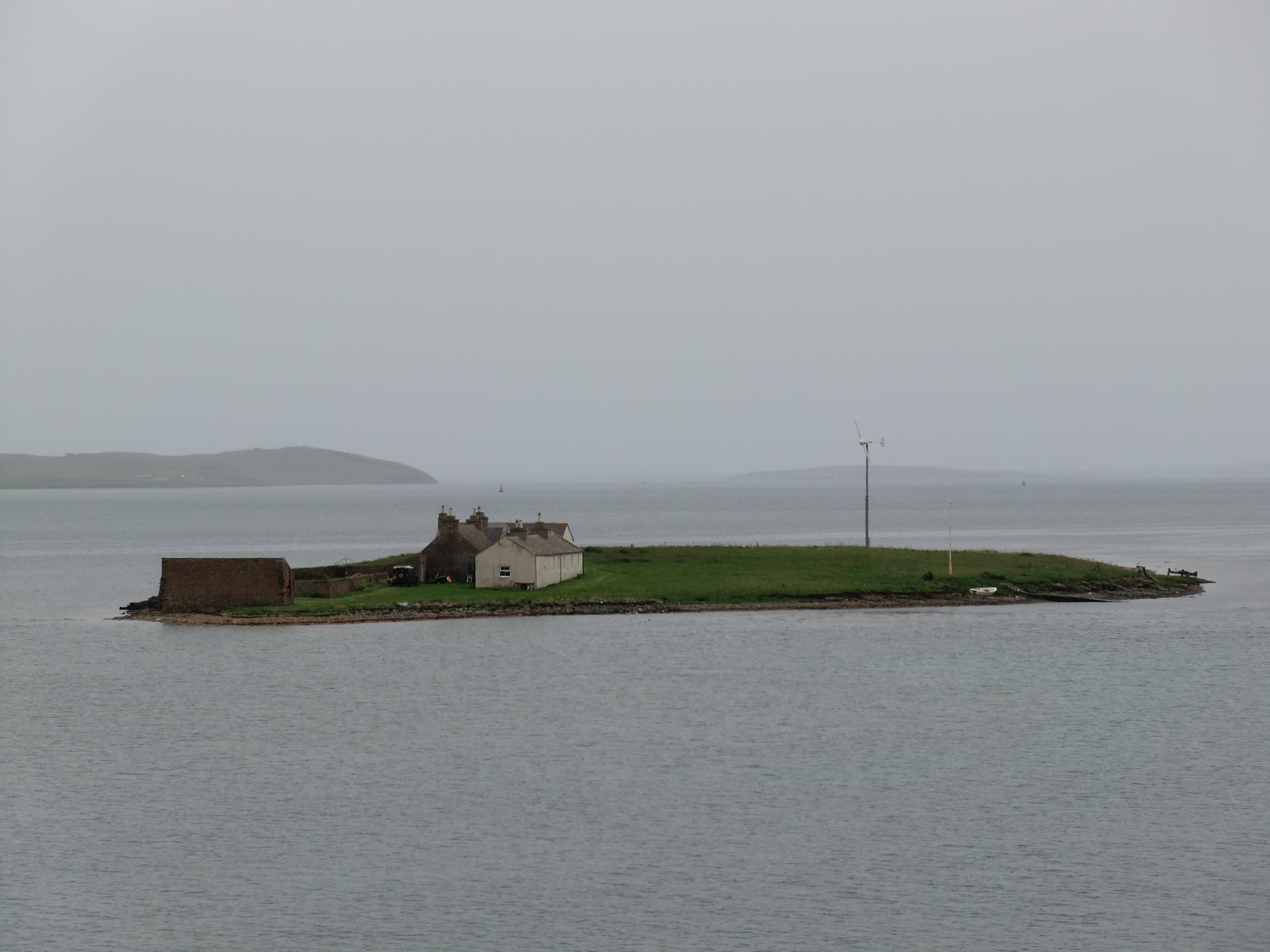
- Inner Holm from MV Hamnavoe

Location
- Inner Holm shown within Orkney
- OS grid reference: HY259087
- Coordinates: 58.96°N 3.289°W

Name
- Name meaning: inner rounded islet
- Old Norse name: Unknown

Physical geography
- Island group: Orkney
- Area: c. 2 hectares (4.9 acres)
- Highest elevation: 16 m (52 ft)

Administration
- Council area: Orkney Islands
- Country: Scotland
- Sovereign state: United Kingdom

Demographics
- Population: 1
- Population rank: 89=

Inner Holm is a small inhabited island in Stromness harbour and one of the Orkney islands of Scotland.

It is about 350 metres (1,150 ft) east of the harbour front of Stromness but it is connected to the Orkney Mainland shore at low tide on the opposite side of the bay. The larger islet of Outer Holm, to which Inner Holm is also connected at low tide, lies to the south. The waters of Cairston Roads, part of Scapa Flow, lie to the east.

Although not recorded as permanently inhabited in 2001 according to the 2011 census there was a single inhabitant both at that time and in 2001 when the total for the islet was included with that of Orkney itself. There built structures are at the north end and a stony causeway allows for vehicular access at low tides. A small wind turbine has been erected on the west coast.

The SS Gnome ran aground on 23 January 1857 while entering Stromness harbour "on the Holme side". It is thought she was successfully recovered from a position between the Inner and Outer Holm.

== Notes ==
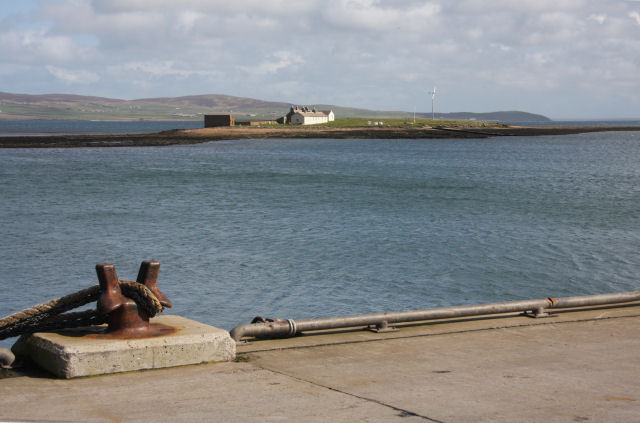
Inner Holm from Stromness harbour at mid-tide
