= MV Hamnavoe =

Scottish car and passenger ferry

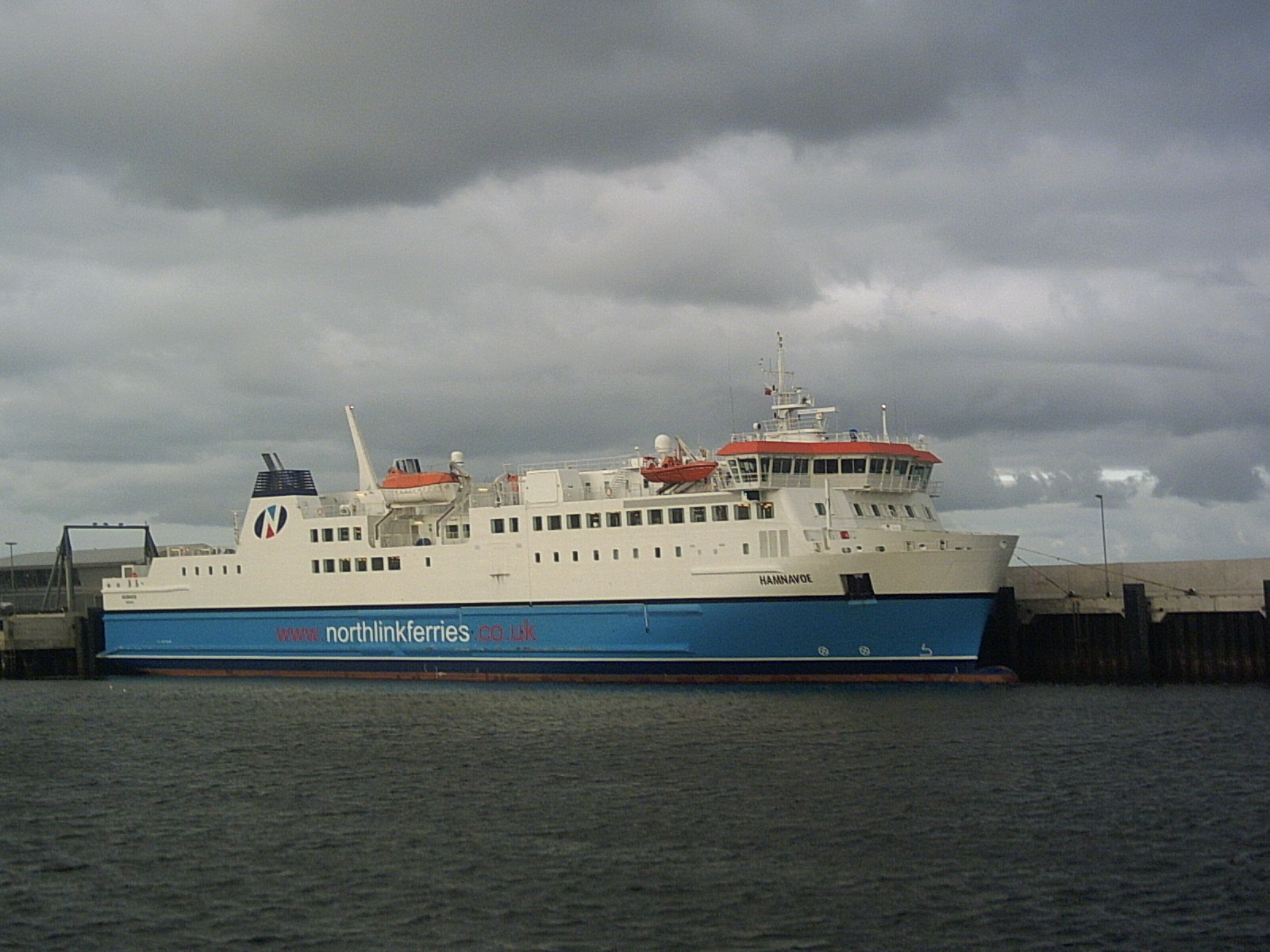
- MV Hamnavoe at Scrabster Harbour in 2008

History

United Kingdom
- Name: Hamnavoe
- Namesake: The old Viking name for Stromness, meaning safe harbour
- Owner: 2002–2004: NorthLink Orkney & Shetland Ferries Limited; 2004–2012: RBS - RBSSAF (20) Limited; 2012–2018: previous owner renamed Northern Isles Ferries Limited; 2018–present: Caledonian Maritime Assets Limited
- Operator: NorthLink Ferries
- Port of registry: Kirkwall, UK
- Route: Scrabster to Stromness, Orkney
- Builder: Aker Finnyards, Rauma, Finland
- Cost: £28 million
- Yard number: 440
- Laid down: 27 November 2001 (metal cutting)
- Launched: June 2002 (float-out)
- Christened: 19 October 2002; by Mrs Linda Harcus
- Completed: 2002
- In service: 23 April 2003
- Homeport: Stromness
- Identification: IMO number: 9246061; MMSI number: 235449000; Call sign: VSTY7
- Status: In service

General characteristics
- Type: Roll on/Roll Off Passenger Ferry
- Tonnage: 8,780 GT; 2,634 NT
- Displacement: 5,350 tons
- Length: 112 m (367 ft)
- Beam: 18.5 m (61 ft)
- Draught: 4.4 m (14 ft)
- Decks: 7
- Installed power: 2 × MaK 9M32C, each 4,340 kW (5,820 bhp)
- Propulsion: Controllable pitch propellers
- Speed: 19 knots (35 km/h; 22 mph)
- Capacity: 600 passengers; 450 lane meters; 95 cars
- Crew: 28

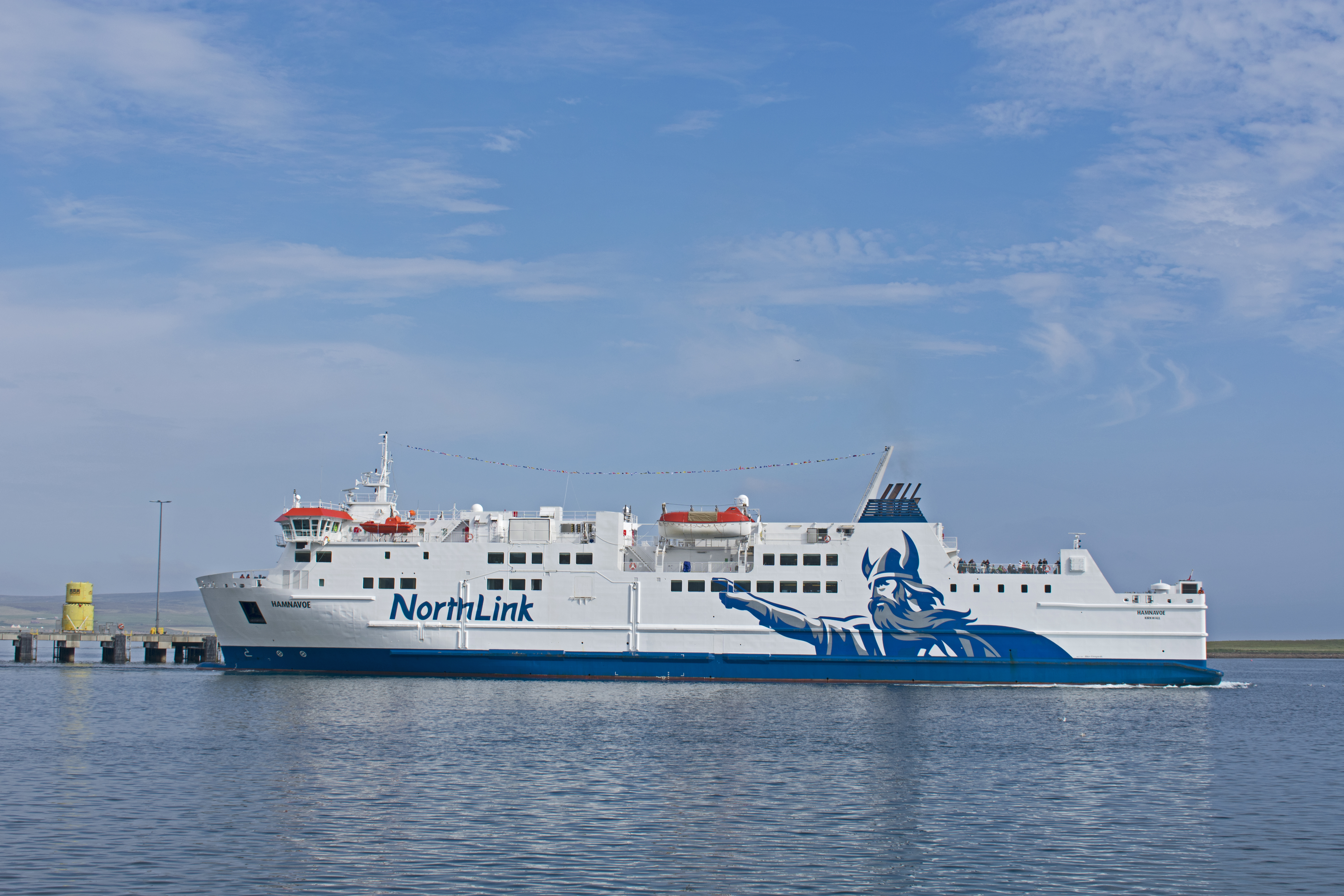
MV Hamnavoe in Stromness in 2022

MV Hamnavoe is a car and passenger ferry, built in 2002 and operated by NorthLink Ferries across the Pentland Firth from the mainland of Scotland to the Orkney Islands.

== Description ==
The ship, with a length of 112 m (367 ft) and beam 18.5 m (61 ft), measures 8,780 GT. Hamnavoe has a capacity for 600 passengers and 68 cars. Facilities include passenger lounges and bars, a self-service restaurant, a children's playroom, a sun deck and a games room. There are 16 passenger cabins with two or four berths, which are all en suite. There are two specially adapted cabins for the disabled and wheelchair access throughout the ship.

Hamnavoe is powered by twin MaK 9M32C diesels, totalling 8,680 kW (11,640 bhp) and resulting in a service speed of 19 knots (35 km/h; 22 mph).

== History ==
Hamnavoe is the first ferry to have been specifically built for the Pentland Firth route, and was given the old Norse name for Stromness, meaning 'Home Port' or 'Safe Haven'. The ship was originally ordered in October 2000 from Ferguson Shipbuilders at Port Glasgow but Fergusons withdrew from the contract only two months later due to design arrangements and production scheduling. The construction was re-allocated to Aker Finnyards at Rauma, Finland which had already been awarded contracts for two larger ferries for NorthLink.

The ship was the third vessel in Aker's build sequence, after MV Hjaltland and the MV Hrossey, and was completed in October 2002. However, due to delays in the building of the new pier in Scrabster, Hamnavoe was laid up in Leith. Since 2003 the formal ownership of Hamnavoe has changed in line with changes in the operator of NorthLink. Since 2018 the ferry has been registered to Caledonian Marine Assets Limited, and operated by Serco.

== Service ==
Hamnavoe was introduced on the Pentland Firth lifeline ferry service between Scrabster in Caithness and Stromness in Orkney in 2003. The voyage takes approximately 90 minutes and is made up to six times a day. Overnight accommodation is available on board in Stromness for passengers travelling on the 6:30 a.m. sailing.

The route gives a superb view of the spectacular sea stack the Old Man of Hoy, and the tallest vertical cliff face in Britain, St Johns Head.

New piers and walkways have been built at Scrabster and Stromness specifically for Hamnavoe, and fitted with lifts to accommodate disabled passengers.

== Volcanic ash cloud ==
In April 2010 as the volcanic ash cloud from Iceland closed much of Europe's airspace, Hamnavoe was taken off her normal route for three days and sent to Bergen in Norway to rescue stranded British residents. More than 150 passengers took the 18-hour trip from Bergen to Aberdeen. On returning to her usual route, Hamnavoe made an unscheduled trip from Aberdeen to Stromness in Orkney carrying passengers.
