= MV Hjaltland =

Ship built in 2002

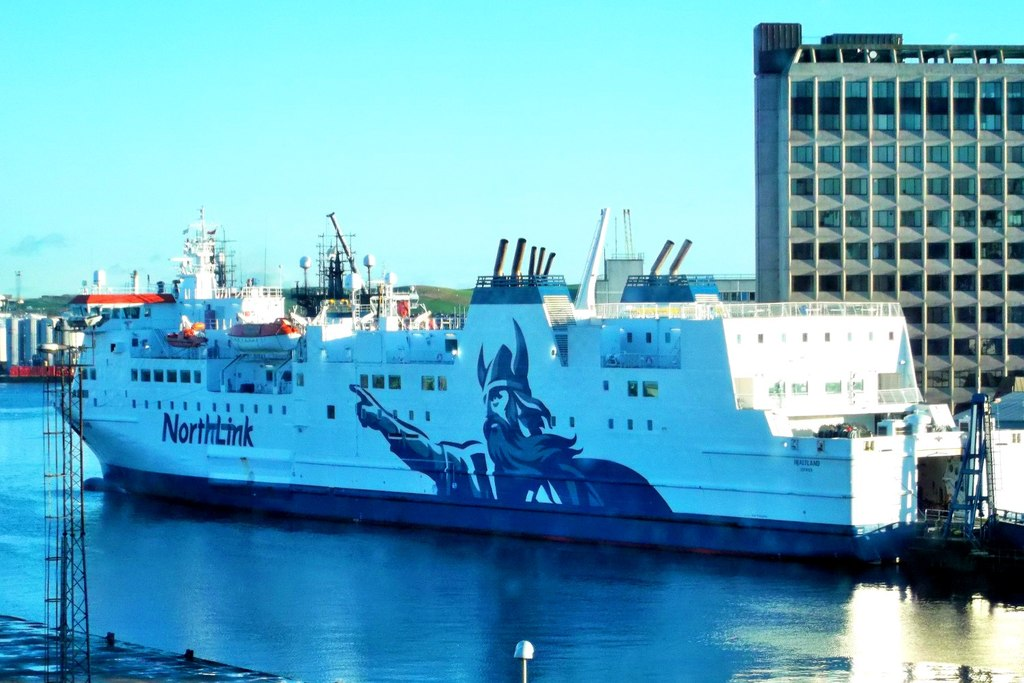
- MV Hjaltland in Aberdeen in 2015

History

United Kingdom
- Name: MV Hjaltland
- Namesake: Old Norse name for Shetland
- Owner: 2002-2004: NorthLink Orkney & Shetland Ferries; 2004-2012: RBS - RBSSAF (20) Limited; 2012-2018: previous owner renamed Northern Isles Ferries; from 2018-present Caledonian Maritime Assets
- Operator: NorthLink Ferries
- Port of registry: Lerwick, Scotland
- Route: Aberdeen to Lerwick via Kirkwall
- Builder: Aker Finnyards in Rauma, Finland
- Cost: £35 million
- Yard number: NB438
- Laid down: 4 October 2001
- Launched: 8 March 2002
- In service: 1 October 2002
- Identification: IMO number: 9244958; MMSI number: 235450000; Callsign: VSTY8
- Status: in service

General characteristics
- Class & type: +100 A 1, Ro-Ro Cargo/Passenger Ferry + LMC, UMS, LI, NAV1
- Tonnage: 11,720 GT; 1,831 t DWT
- Displacement: 7,434 tonnes
- Length: 125 m (410 ft)
- Beam: 20 m (66 ft)
- Draught: 5.4 m (18 ft)
- Decks: 8
- Installed power: 4 x MAK 6M43 5400 kW each
- Propulsion: 2 controllable pitch propellers and 2 bow thrusters
- Speed: 24 kn (44 km/h)
- Capacity: 600 passengers (117 cabins); 140 cars (650m)
- Crew: 33

MV Hjaltland is a NorthLink Ferries vehicle and passenger ferry based in Aberdeen, Scotland. She operates the daily service from mainland Scotland to Orkney and Shetland.

== History ==
MV Hjaltland and her sister ship, MV Hrossey, were constructed in 2002 at Aker Finnyards in Finland.

== Layout ==
MV Hjaltland carries passengers, cars, freight and livestock. There are a choice of restaurants, bars and lounges, children's play area and a cinema. The restaurants and lounges have a total seating capacity of 600. The original 100 cabins had a total of 300 beds. All cabins are en-suite, most being two berth, with a number of four-berth cabins for families. In April 2007, an additional accommodation module was fitted in Birkenhead, increasing her capacity to 356 berths. The ship is fitted with lifts and was built to accommodate disabled passengers throughout. There are 10 officer and 28 crew cabins.

Each pair of diesel engines drives a controllable-pitch propeller through a gearbox. There are two rudders, two 900 kW bow thrusters and two Mitsubishi stabilisers.

== Service ==
MV Hjaltland operates between Lerwick and Aberdeen, with a call at Kirkwall on some days. A walkway, built specifically for the current vessels, can take both foot and car passengers. She is also able to relieve on the Stromness to Scrabster crossing.

== Incidents and accidents ==
In August 2012, a man died after falling overboard into the North Sea about 20 miles (30 kilometres) north of Fraserburgh.

On 23 August 2013, MV Hjaltland was diverted from its normal route to assist with search and rescue efforts following the crash of a Super Puma helicopter 2 mi (3 km) off the Shetland coast close to Sumburgh. The ferry was later used to transport the bodies of three of the crash victims to Aberdeen.

On 9 September 2013, a passenger went missing from the ship during a sailing from Lerwick to Aberdeen. No body was recovered despite a major air and sea search.
