= Walter Sutherland (Norn) =

Last known native speaker of Norn (died c. 1850)

- Born: Skaw, Unst
- Died: c. 1850; Unst
- Known for: Last native speaker of Norn

Walter Sutherland (died c. 1850) was a Scottish man, who was reportedly the last native speaker of Norn, a North Germanic language which had once been spoken throughout Shetland, Orkney and Caithness. Sutherland was from Skaw, on the island of Unst, and quoted as being a fisherman who lived in the northernmost house in the British Isles, near the present-day Unst Boat Haven.

Sutherland may, however, have been merely the last native speaker of Norn on Unst. Some unnamed Norn speakers of the island of Foula were reported by Jakob Jakobsen to have survived much later than the middle of the 20th century, though he noted doubt that these people were able to speak "genuine Norn". Another surveyor, Laurits Rendboe, argued in 1987 that the last living speakers of Norn were indeed these men from Foula. Despite this, Sutherland remains the last recorded Norn speaker.
