= MV Hrossey =

British ferry

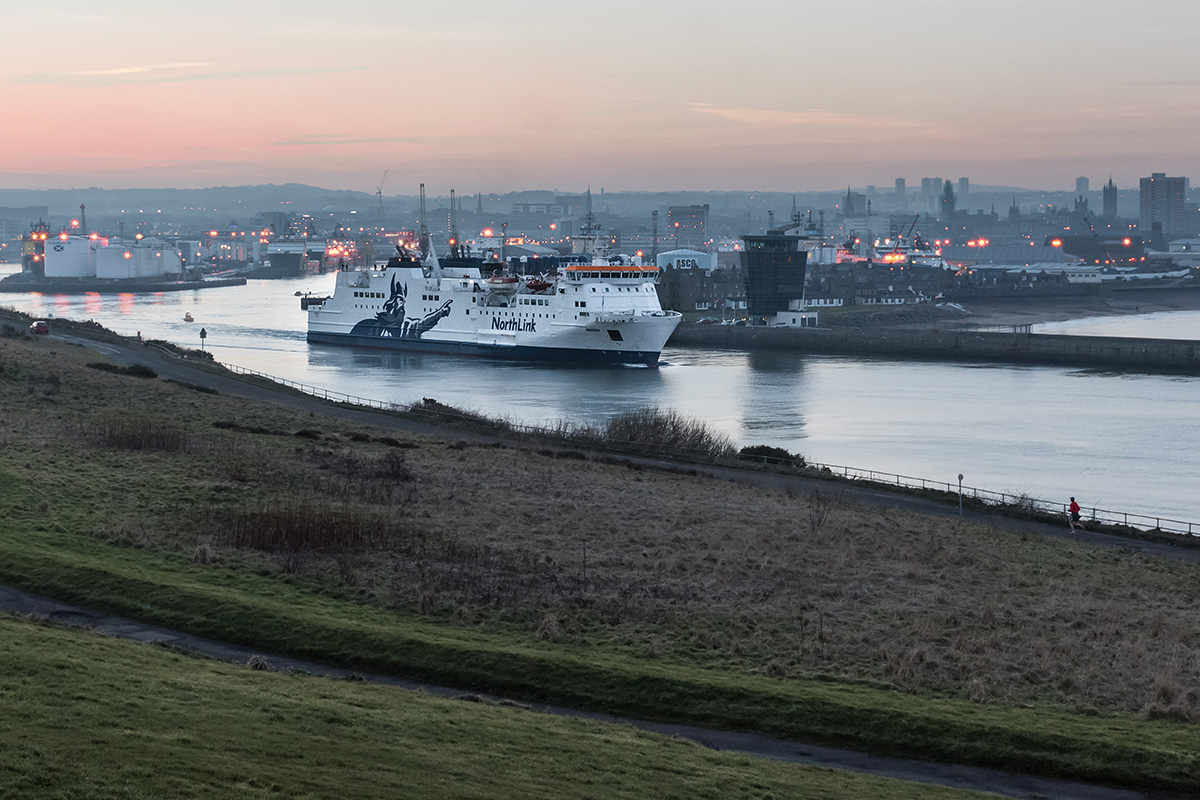
- MV Hrossey leaving Aberdeen, 2015

History

United Kingdom
- Name: MV Hrossey
- Namesake: Old Norse name for Orkney, meaning Horse Island
- Owner: 2002-2004: NorthLink Orkney & Shetland Ferries Limited; 2004-2012: RBS - RBSSAF (20) Limited; 2012-2018: previous owner renamed Northern Isles Ferries Limited; 2018-present: Caledonian Maritime Assets Limited
- Operator: NorthLink Ferries
- Port of registry: Kirkwall, United Kingdom
- Route: Aberdeen to Lerwick via Kirkwall
- Builder: Aker Finnyards in Rauma, Finland
- Cost: £35million
- Yard number: NB439
- Laid down: 1 December 2001
- Launched: 19 April 2002
- Christened: 28 September 2002 by Kirsten Kelday
- In service: 1 October 2002
- Identification: IMO number: 9244960; MMSI number: 235448000; Callsign: VSTY6
- Status: in service

General characteristics
- Tonnage: 11,720 GT; 1,831 t DWT
- Displacement: 7,434 tonnes
- Length: 125 m (410 ft)
- Beam: 20 m (66 ft)
- Draught: 5.4 m (18 ft)
- Decks: 8
- Installed power: 4 x MAK 6M43 5400 KW each
- Propulsion: 2x KaMeWa 4.1 meter controllable pitch propellers with 2 rudders.
- Speed: 24 knots
- Capacity: 600 passengers (117 cabins); 140 cars (650m)
- Crew: 33

MV Hrossey is a NorthLink Ferries vehicle and passenger ferry based in Aberdeen. Along with her sister ship, the MV Hjaltland, she operates a daily ferry service between mainland Scotland and the northern archipelagos of Orkney and Shetland.

== History ==
MV Hrossey and her sister ship, MV Hjaltland were both constructed in 2002 at Aker Finnyards in Finland.

In 2013 after Serco being awarded the NorthLink ferries contract MV Hrossey underwent several refurbishments as a part of its rebranding, including new “sleeping pods” and bold livery featuring a beckoning Viking.

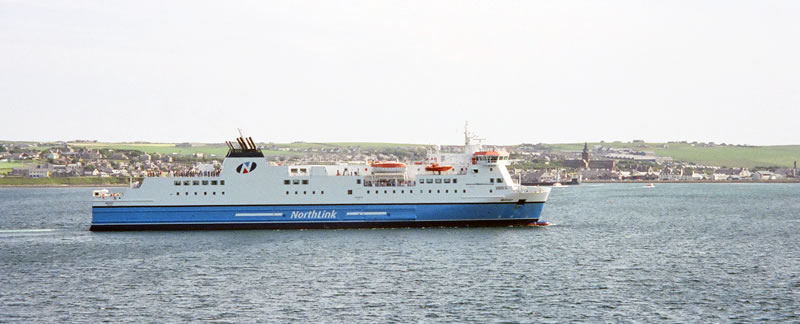
MV Hrossey in 2007 Departing Kirkwall with old paint job

== Layout ==
MV Hrossey carries passengers, cars, freight and livestock. There is a choice of restaurants, bars and lounges, children's play area and a cinema. The restaurants and lounges have a total seating capacity of 600. The original 100 cabins had a total of 300 beds. All cabins are en-suite, most being two berth, with a number of four-berth cabins for families. In April 2007, an additional accommodation module was fitted at Cammell Laird in Birkenhead, increasing her capacity to 356 berths. The ship is fitted with lifts and was built to accommodate disabled passengers throughout. There are 10 officer and 27 crew cabins.

Each pair of diesel engines drives a controllable-pitch propeller through a gearbox. There are two rudders, two 900 kW bow thrusters and two Mitsubishi stabilisers.

== Service ==
MV Hrossey operates between Lerwick and Aberdeen, with a call at Kirkwall on some days. A walkway, built specifically for the current vessels, can take both foot and car passengers. She is also able to relieve on the Stromness to Scrabster crossing.

On 3 January 2015. Hrossey discovered the upturned hull of the Cypriot cargo ship Cemfjord in the Pentland Firth. A search was launched for her eight crew.
