= NorthLink Ferries =

Operator of ferry services between mainland Scotland and Orkney and Shetland

- Industry: Transport
- Founded: 2002 (NorthLink Orkney and Shetland Ferries); 2006 (NorthLink Ferries); 2012 (Serco NorthLink Ferries)
- Headquarters: Aberdeen, Scotland
- Area served: Pentland Firth, Orkney and Shetland
- Key people: Stuart Garrett (Managing Director)
- Services: Ferries
- Parent: Serco
- Website: www.northlinkferries.co.uk

NorthLink Ferries (also referred to as Serco NorthLink Ferries) is an operator of passenger and vehicle ferries, as well as ferry services, between mainland Scotland and the Northern Isles of Orkney and Shetland. Since July 2012, it has been operated by international services company Serco.

== History ==
NorthLink Ferries logo used from 2002 to 2013

=== NorthLink Orkney and Shetland Ferries ===
The subsidised Northern Isles ferry services, previously run by P&O Scottish Ferries, were put out to tender in 1999. A joint venture between Caledonian MacBrayne and The Royal Bank of Scotland, named NorthLink Orkney and Shetland Ferries, won the contract and began operation in October 2002.

A variety of factors, including competition from rival operator Pentland Ferries, the Norse Island Ferries group created by local hauliers concerned about NorthLink's proposed freight pricing, and higher-than-expected operation costs, all contributed to financial difficulties within the company. In response, the Scottish Executive Transport Group (now Transport Scotland) made additional subsidy payments of £0.6 million and agreed to restructure subsidy payment timing.

In mid-2003 the company indicated that it would be unlikely to complete the contract due to its ongoing financial difficulties. NorthLink defaulted on its lease payments for the vessels in July and August 2003, and in April 2004 the then Scottish Executive announced that the service would be re-tendered due to NorthLink's inability to fulfil the terms of its contract.

The company continued to operate under interim arrangements until April 2006 while a new contract was secured.

=== NorthLink Ferries Limited ===
On 19 July 2005, the Scottish Executive announced that three companies - V-Ships, Irish Continental Ferries and Caledonian MacBrayne - had bid to provide ferry services to the Northern Isles. Irish Continental, however, withdrew its bid in October 2005, leaving two potential operators on the closing date of 1 December 2005. Both of the remaining bids complied with the contract requirements, but Caledonian MacBrayne's lower bid meant that it was awarded the contract.

Caledonian MacBrayne formed a company named NorthLink Ferries Limited, which adopted the branding and vessels of its predecessor, and began operating the Northern Isles ferry services on 6 July 2006.

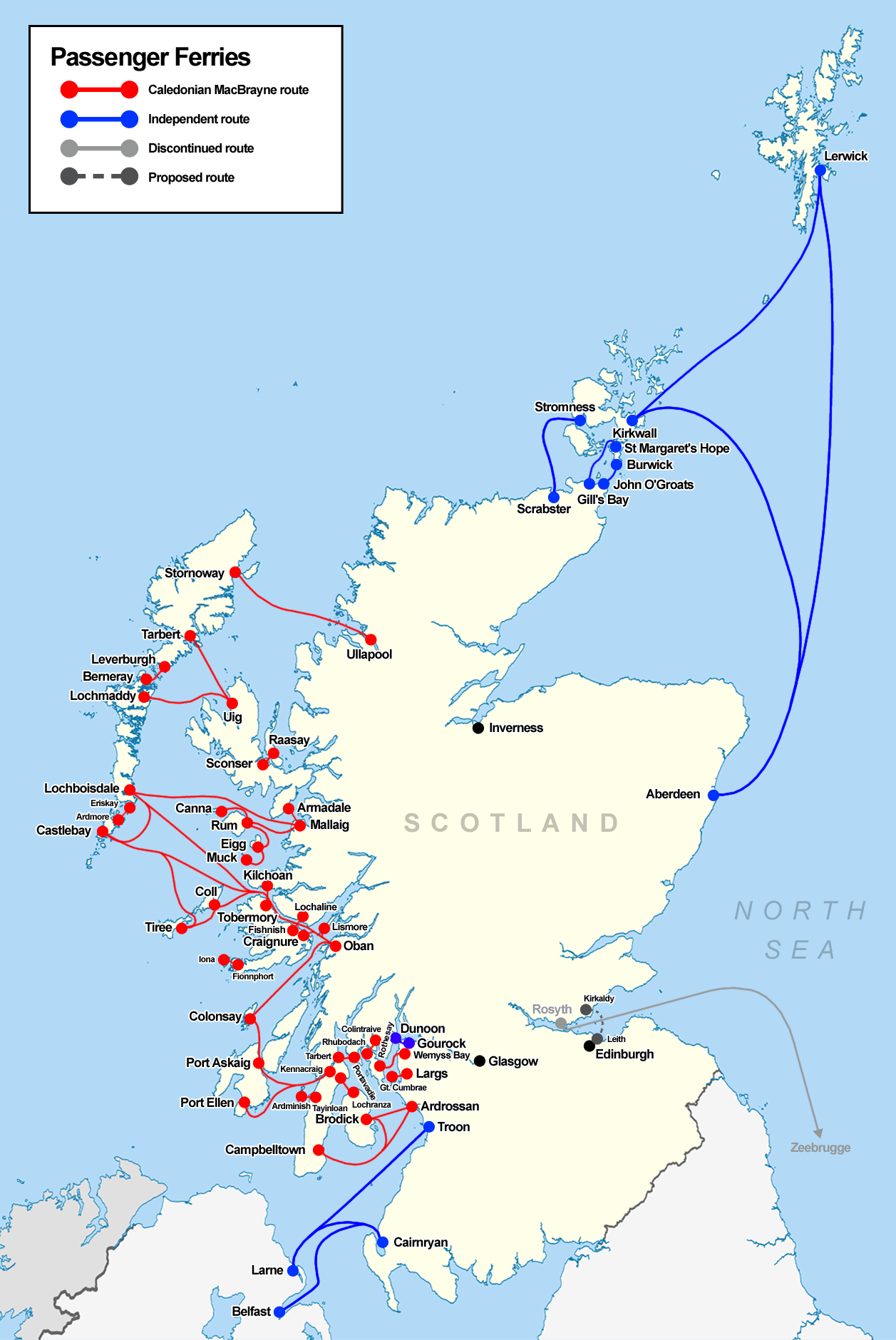
Map of ferry services in Scotland

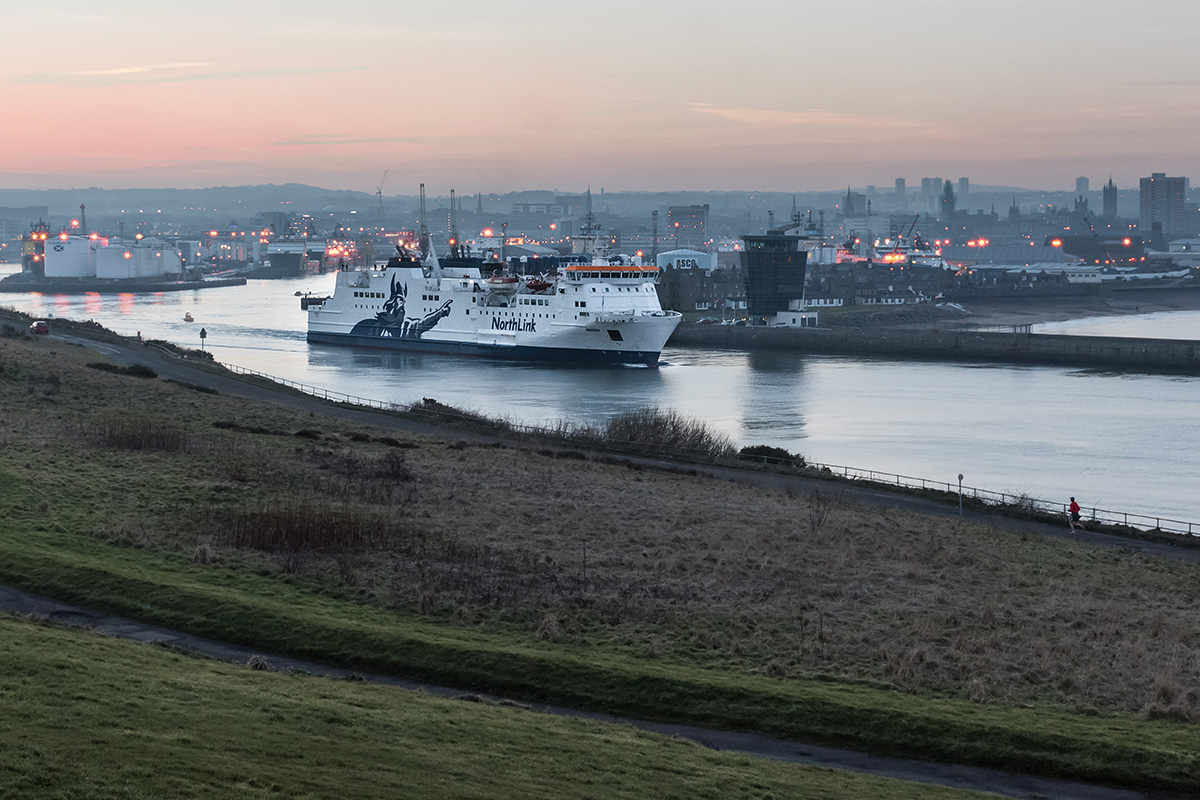
MV Hrossey departing Aberdeen Harbour, Scotland. Current fleet branding in use since Spring 2013.

=== Serco NorthLink Ferries ===
The Northern Isles ferry service was re-tendered in 2011/12 as NorthLink Ferries Limited's contract came to an end.

Initially, the contract's two services (Aberdeen-Lerwick and Scrabster-Stromness) were to be de-bundled. Eligible bids for the services were received from Pentland Ferries (which expressed interest in the Scrabster-Stromness service only), Sea-Cargo A/S (which expressed interest in the Aberdeen-Lerwick service only), P&O Ferries, Shetland Line (1984) Limited (part of local haulage and freight company Streamline Shipping Group), Serco, and the incumbent NorthLink Ferries Limited. The Scottish Government subsequently re-bundled the routes, when insufficient interest was shown in the separate routes.

On 4 May 2012, Transport Scotland announced that Serco was the preferred bidder. This decision was legally challenged in the Court of Session by rival bidder Shetland Line (1984) Limited on the basis that the Scottish Government had allegedly not taken into account that they had scored higher than Serco for their proposed service - suspending the securement of the contract. On 29 May 2012 however, the court overturned the suspension and Serco was confirmed as the new operator, ending Caledonian MacBrayne's 10 year involvement with Northern Isles ferry services. The contract was for a period of six years and was worth £243m.

Serco, using the vessels and branding of its predecessor, began operation of Northern Isles ferry services at 15:00 on 5 July 2012. It stated that it planned to make no changes to fares or timetables for the remainder of 2012, and that it planned to "overhaul catering, seating and onboard entertainment" in future.

In the spring of 2013 NorthLink rebranded and launched new on board services such as "sleep pod" reclining seats and a premium lounge. The contract was due to end in 2018, but Serco received an 18-month extension. Arguments have been put forward by the RMT union to bring the service into public ownership.

Transport Scotland awarded Serco a new contract to operate the Northern Isles ferry services in April 2020. The contract began on 30 June 2020 for an initial term of six years, with an option to extend for a further two years. In June 2026, Transport Scotland announced that the tender process for the successor contract had begun, with a planned contract commencement date of 30 June 2028.

== Services ==
NorthLink operates two passenger routes:

- Scrabster to Stromness, Orkney (90 minutes)
- Aberdeen to Lerwick, Shetland (12 hours 30 minutes northbound; 12 hours southbound). Some services also call at Kirkwall, Orkney, which increases the journey time by 2 hours.

== Current fleet ==
Currently the NorthLink fleet consists of:

Name	Cars	Lane metres	Passengers	Length (metres)	Route	Launched	Entered service	Shipbuilders	Image
MV Helliar	88 trailers	1055	12	122.32	Aberdeen - Kirkwall - Lerwick (Freight)	13 November 1996	10 January 2011	Astilleros de Huelva, Spain	
MV Hildasay	88 trailers	1055	12	122.32	Aberdeen - Kirkwall - Lerwick (Freight)	4 April 1999	February 2010	Astilleros de Huelva, Spain	
MV Hjaltland	125	650	600	125	Aberdeen - Kirkwall - Lerwick	8 March 2002	1 October 2002	Aker Finnyards, Finland	
MV Hrossey	125	650	600	125	Aberdeen - Kirkwall - Lerwick	19 April 2002	1 October 2002	Aker Finnyards, Finland	
MV Hamnavoe	98	450	600	112	Scrabster - Stromness	June 2002	23 April 2003	Aker Finnyards, Finland	

Scottish Government agency Transport Scotland purchased all of the ferries used by Northlink during the 2018-19 financial year. They will be managed by Scottish Government corporation Caledonian Maritime Assets.

Ferries on the Aberdeen route have onboard cinemas and occasional live entertainment.

MV Hrossey, MV Hjaltland, MV Helliar, and MV Hildasay have all carried out relief on the Pentland Firth in previous years, however the routine now is to cancel the route for the period of the dry docking of MV Hamnavoe. In April 2010 due to the volcanic ash cloud, MV Hamnavoe carried out a one off Aberdeen - Bergen return trip and Aberdeen - Stromness.

== Future fleet ==
Name	Lane metres	Passengers	Length (metres)	Route	Entered service	Shipbuilders	Image
Freight flex vessel 1	1400	200 or 12	140	Aberdeen - Kirkwall - Lerwick (Freight plus)	2029	Guangzhou	Digital Render
Freight flex vessel 2	1400	200 or 12	140	Aberdeen - Kirkwall - Lerwick (Freight plus)	2029	Guangzhou	

The vessels will operate on two modes, passenger mode is peak times (and when the other vessel is dry docking), and freight mode during the low season. They will also be capable of operating at two service speeds of 14 and 20 knots. On 4 June 2025, funding was allocated for these two new freight flex vessels. A contract was awarded to Guangzhou Shipyard (China) in March 2026.

== Former fleet ==
Name	Cars	Passengers	Length (metres)	Route	Launched	Entered service	Left service	Shipbuilders	Image
MV Hascosay	636 lane metres	12	118.42	Aberdeen - Kirkwall - Lerwick (Freight)	2 July 1971	1 October 2002	February 2010	Kristiansands M/VA/S, Kristiansand, Norway	
MV Hebridean Isles (Charter from CalMac)	68	507	85.15	Scrabster - Stromness	4 July 1985	1 Oct 2002; Feb 2004; Jan 2005	April 2003; Feb 2004; Feb 2005	Cochrane Shipbuilders, Selby	
MV St Rognvald (Charter from P&O Scottish Ferries)	696 lane metres	26	103.76	Aberdeen - Kirkwall - Lerwick (Freight)	4 September 1970	July 2003	December 2003	Orestein & Koppel, Lübeck, West Germany	
MV Clare	65 trailers	12	114.86	Aberdeen - Kirkwall - Lerwick (Freight)	6 May 1972	November 2003	December 2010	Rickmers Werft, Bremerhaven, Germany	
MV MN Toucan (Charter from Compagnie Maritime Nantaise)		12	115.5	Aberdeen - Kirkwall - Lerwick (Freight)	1995	2 April 2007	16 April 2007	HC Holland Kinderdijk Kinderdijk, Holland	
MV Arrow (Charter from Seatruck Ferries)	88 trailers	12	122.32	Aberdeen - Kirkwall - Lerwick (Freight)	26 January 1998	Feb 2012; Oct 2014; Nov 2017; Sept 2018; Jan 2020; June 2020	Mar 2012; Nov 2014; Nov 2017; Oct 2018; Jan 2020; June 2020	Astilleros de Huelva, Spain	
