= Scrabster =

Village in Highland, Scotland

Coordinates: 58.609722°N 3.5525°W

Scrabster: Scottish Gaelic: Sgrabastair/Sgrabstal
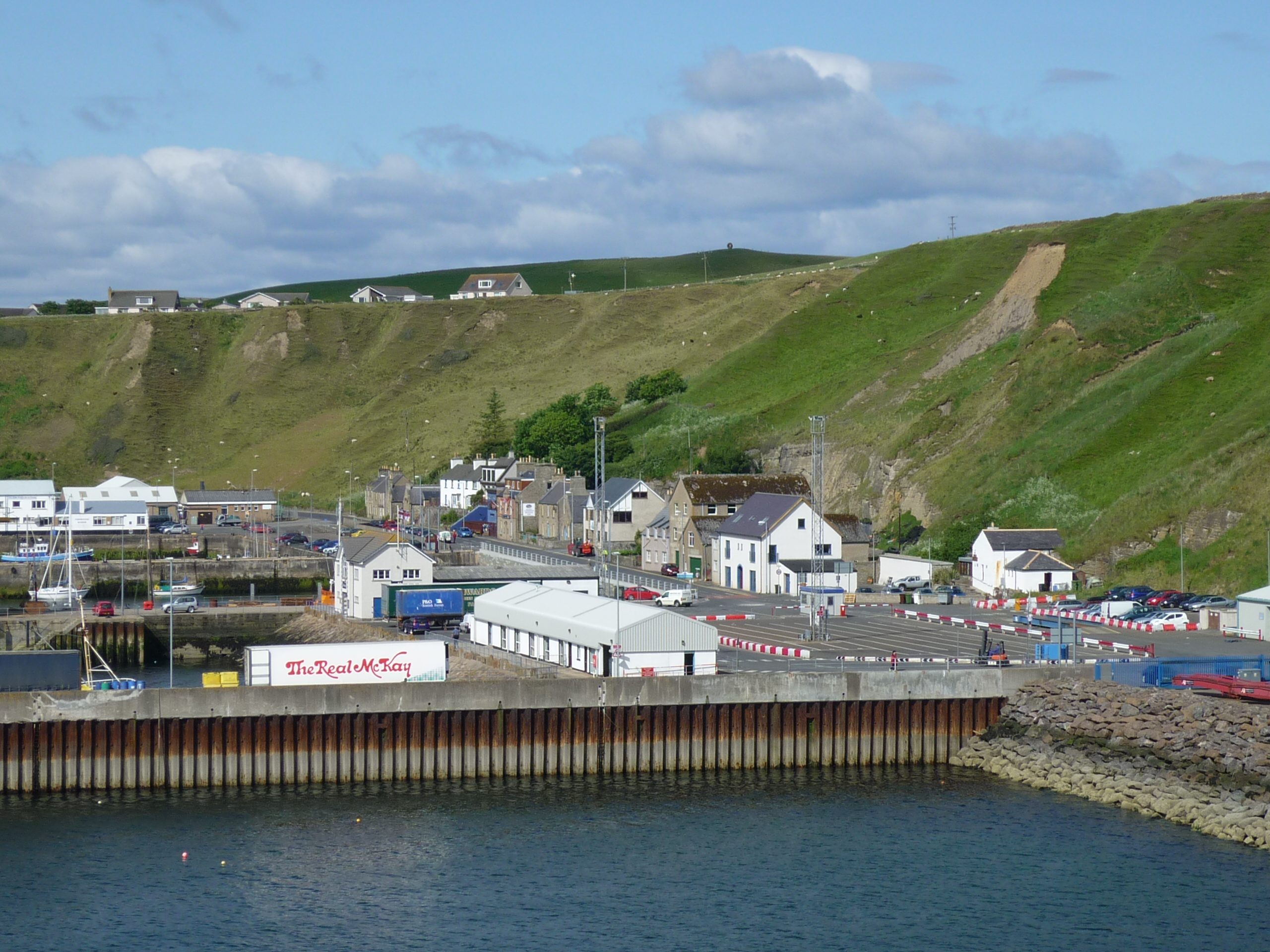
- Scrabster Harbour

- Location within the Caithness area
- OS grid reference: ND099701
- Council area: Highland
- Lieutenancy area: Caithness
- Country: Scotland
- Sovereign state: United Kingdom
- Post town: THURSO
- Postcode district: KW14
- Dialling code: 01847
- Police: Scotland
- Fire: Scottish
- Ambulance: Scottish
- UK Parliament: Caithness, Sutherland and Easter Ross
- Scottish Parliament: Caithness, Sutherland and Ross

Scrabster (Scottish Gaelic: Sgrabastair/Sgrabstal) is a small settlement on Thurso Bay in Caithness on the north coast of Scotland. It is some 1 1/2 miles (2.4 km) from Thurso, 22 1/2 miles (36.2 km) from Wick, 112 miles (180 km) from Inverness and 271.7 miles (437.2 km) from Edinburgh. Scrabster Harbour is an important port for the Scottish fishing industry.

During the Second World War, munitions were ferried to Scapa Flow from Scrabster harbour aboard the 40 ft (12.2 m) pilot cutter Mermaid (registered in King's Lynn and built in 1908), skippered by Antony Bridges.

== Transport ==
The NorthLink ferry (MV Hamnavoe) leaves regularly from Scrabster for Stromness in Orkney. Smyril Line operated a weekly service to the Faroe Islands in the summer months, but this was discontinued in 2008.

The nearest railway line is the Far North Line, connecting Thurso to Inverness.

== Fishing ==
Although it is now important, in the years before the First World War, fishing from Thurso and Scrabster was very unpredictable. For example, the Annual Report of the Fishery Board for 1906 states: "The total quantity and value of all kinds of fish are reduced to one fourth of the previous year's owing to the complete failure of the herring fishing".

Fishery Statistics

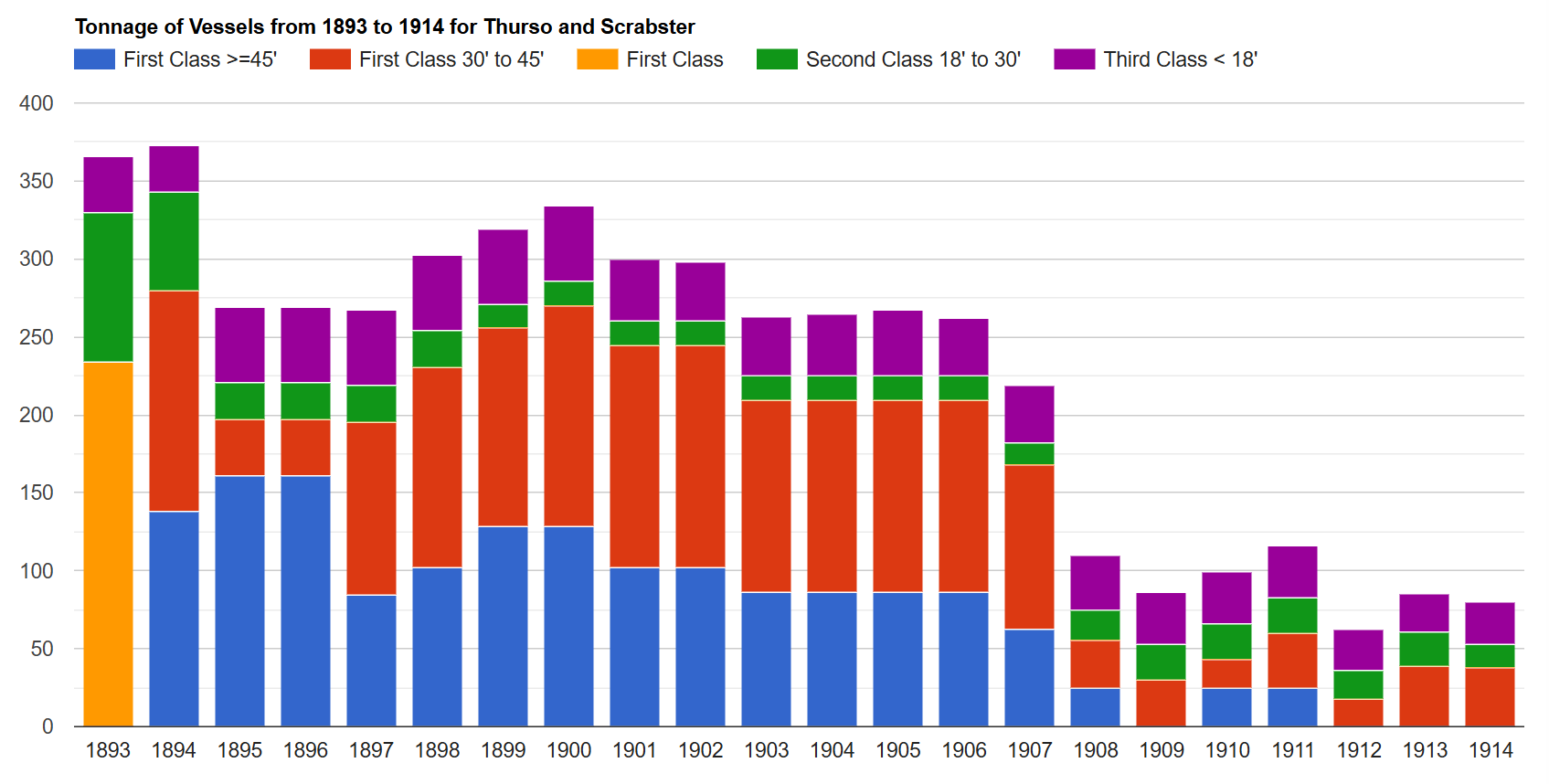
Tonnage of vessels

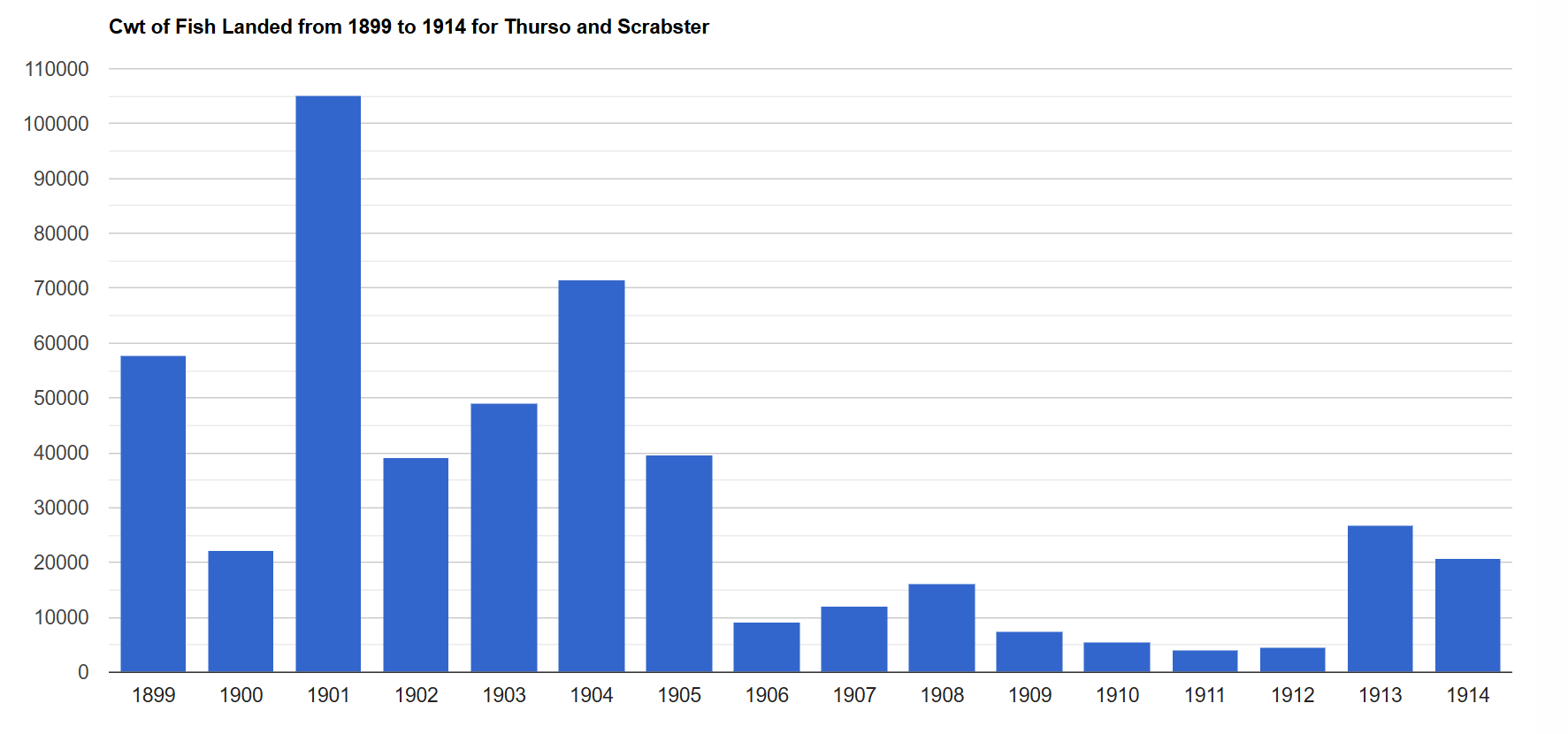
Cwt of fish landed

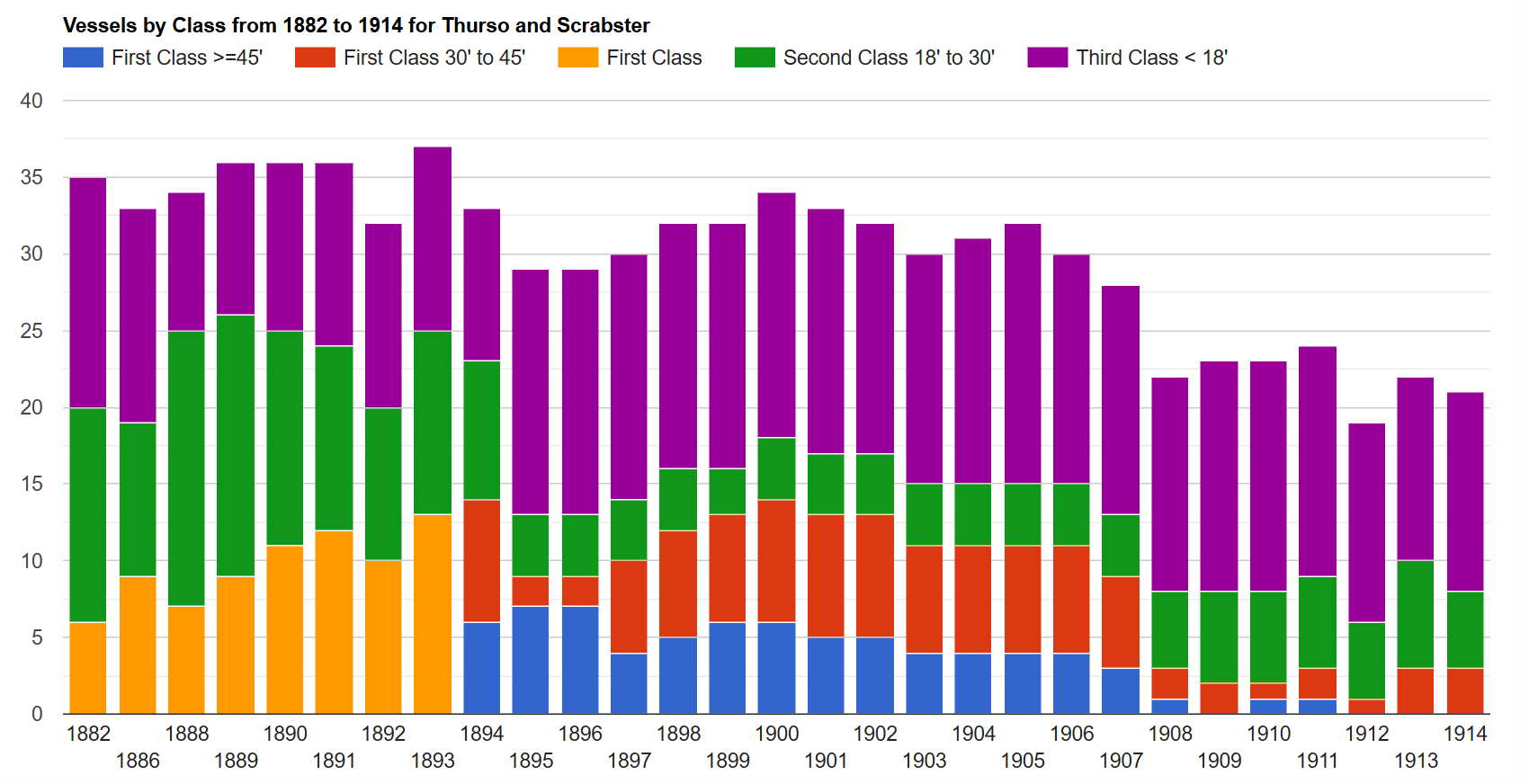
Vessels by class

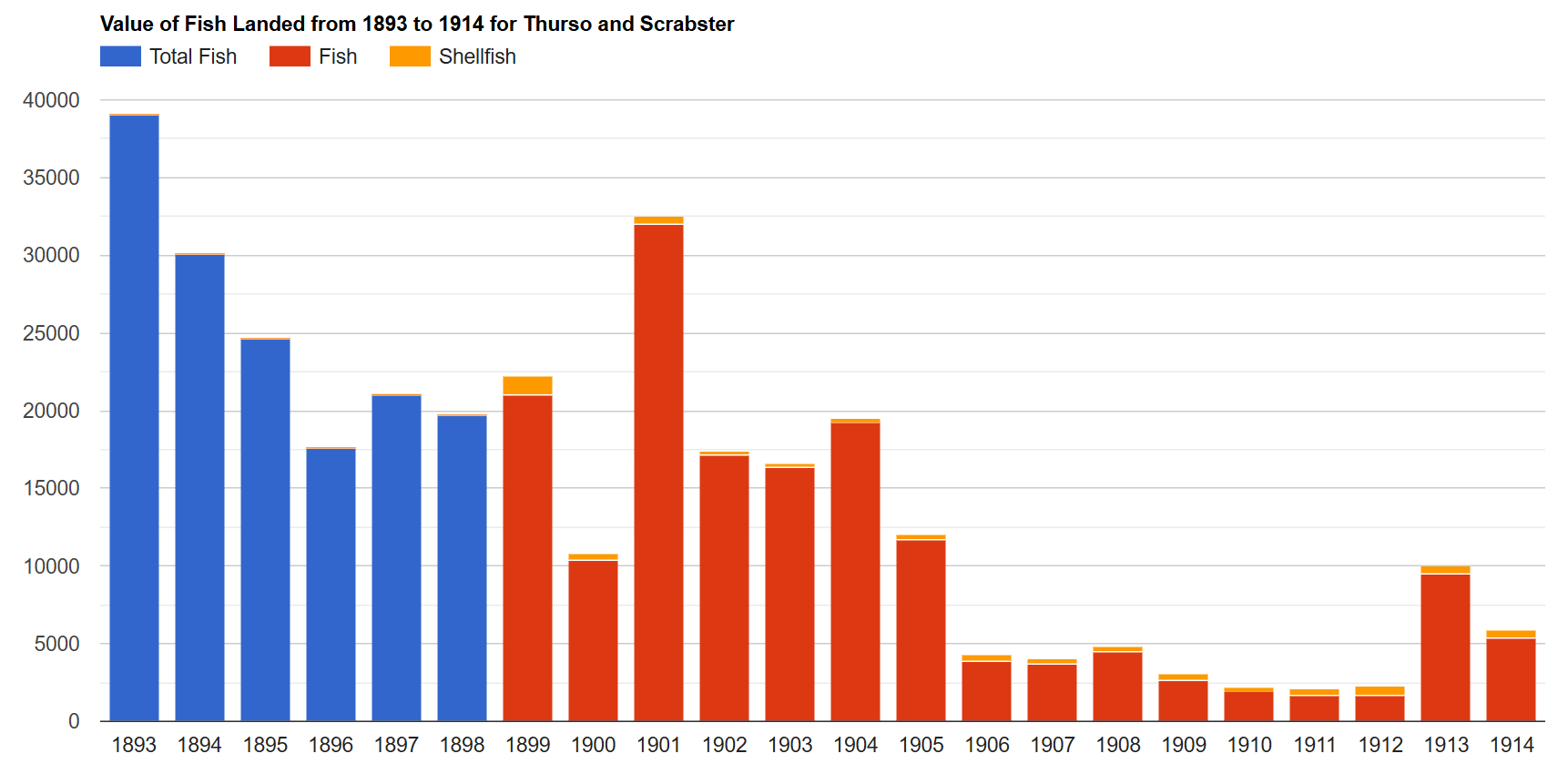
Value (£) of fish landed

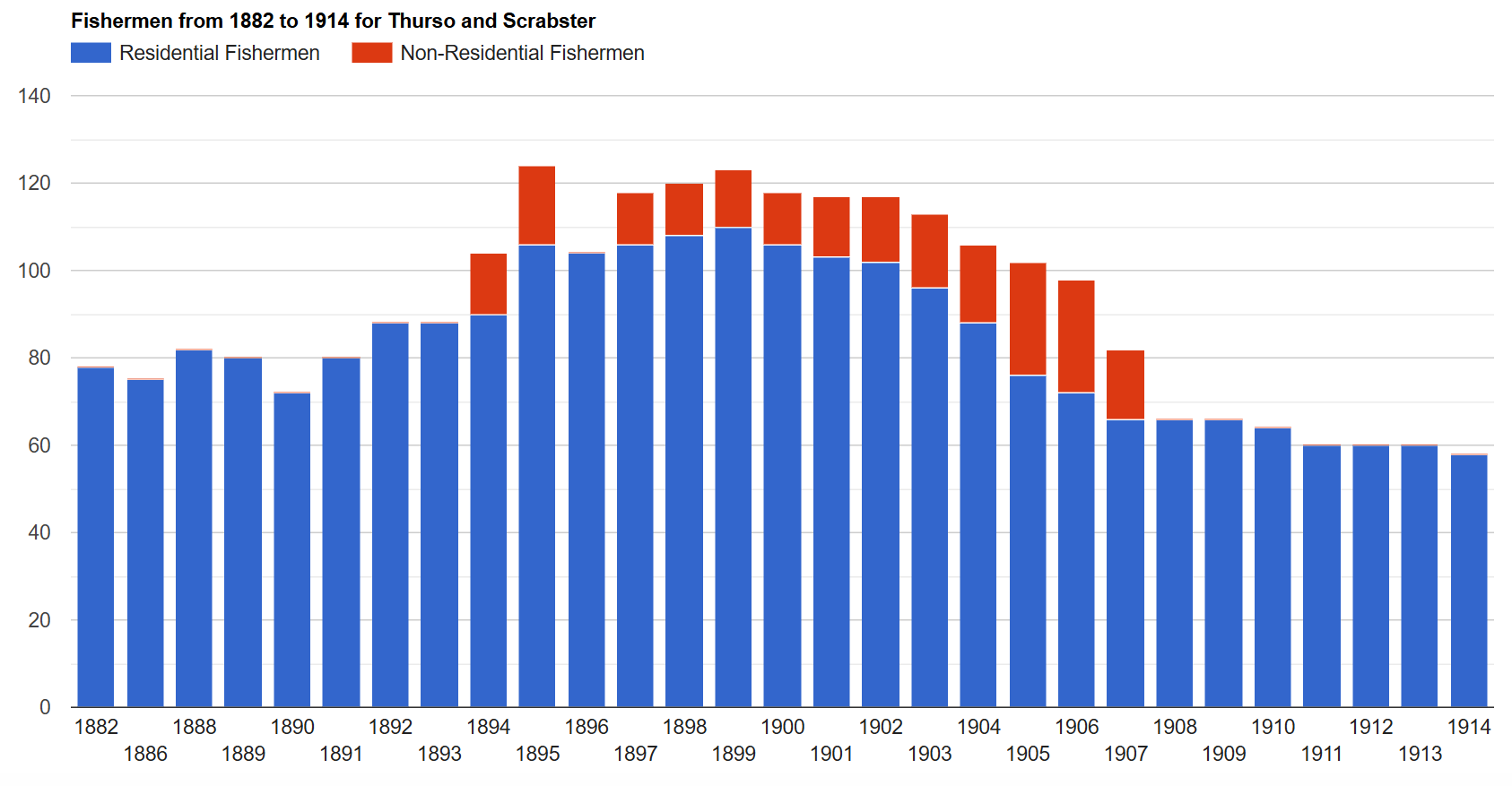
Fishermen

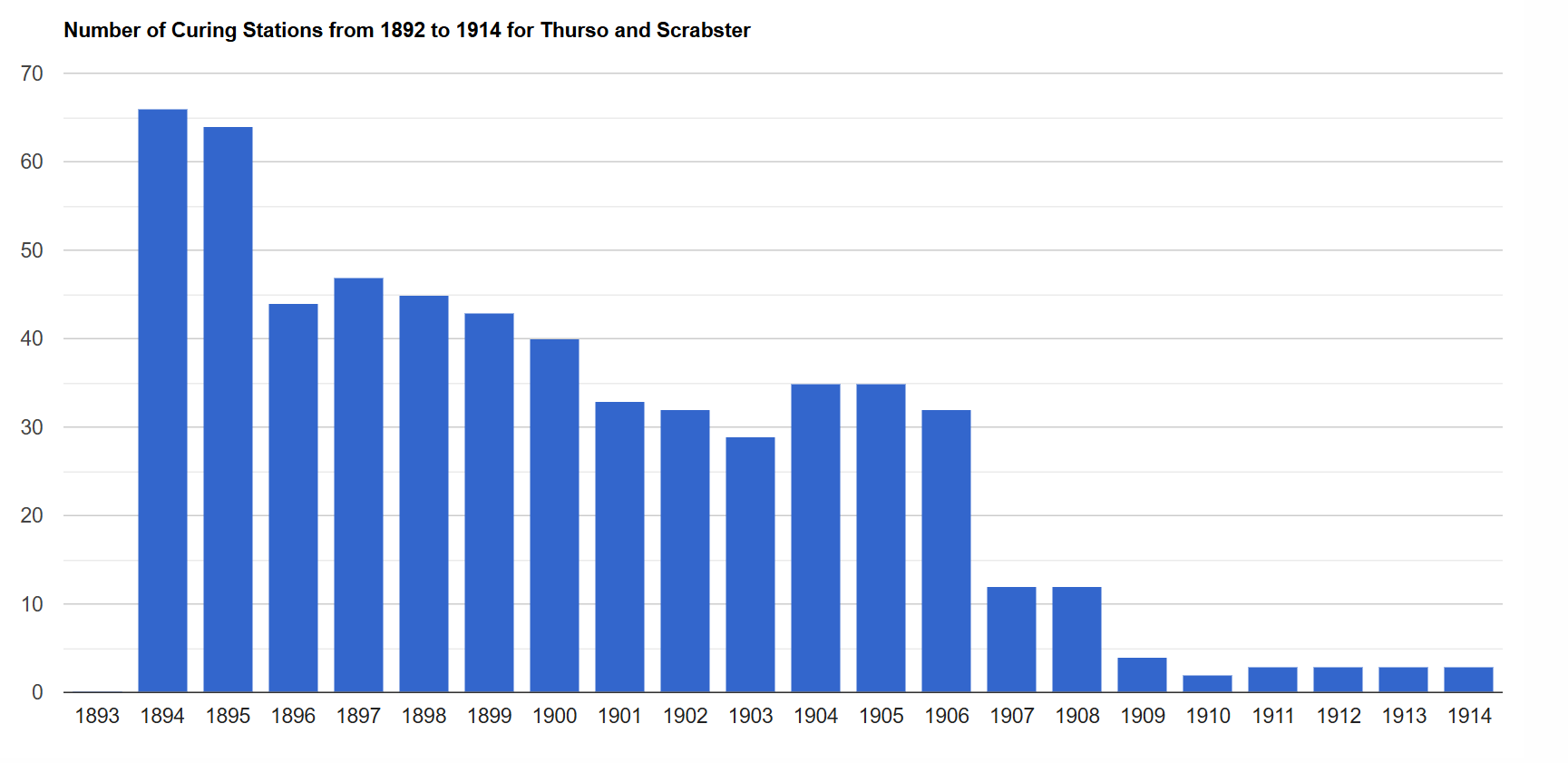
Number of curing stations

== Notable people ==
- George Bain, who led the revivification of Celtic Art, was born in Scrabster.
