= Jacobson =

Jacobson may refer to:

- Jacobson (surname), including a list of people with the name
- Jacobson, Minnesota, a place in the United States
- Jacobson's, an American regional department store chain

== See also ==
- Jacobsen (disambiguation)
- Jakobson (disambiguation)
- Jakobsen, a given name and surname
- Jakobsson, a surname
- Jacobsson, a surname
- Jacobs (disambiguation)
- Buegeleisen and Jacobson, American musical instrument seller
- Jacobson density theorem, in mathematica
- Vomeronasal organ, also known as Jacobson's organ
