= Jacobsen =

Jacobsen may refer to:

- Jacobsen (surname), including a list of people with the name
- Jacobsen Manufacturing, a former American manufacturer
  - Jacobsen, a brand of lawn-care products by Textron
- Jacobsen Publishing, publisher of several American regional newspapers
- Jacobsen (beer), a brand of specialty beers owned by Carlsberg
- Miranda, California (formerly Jacobsen's), a place in Humboldt County, California, U.S.

== See also ==
- Jacobson (disambiguation)
- Jakobsen, a surname
- Jakobson (surname)
- Theodor Jacobsen Observatory, University of Washington, U.S.
- H. N. Jacobsens Bókahandil, a bookshop in Tórshavn, Faroe Islands
