= Jakobson =

Jakobson may refer to:

- Jakobson (surname), a surname (including a list of people with the name)
- Jakobson Shipyard, a defunct shipyard formerly based in New York

== See also ==
- Jacobson (disambiguation)
- Jakobsen
- Jakobsson
