= Jacobsson =

Jacobsson is a Swedish surname. Notable people with the surname include:

- Anders Jacobsson and Sören Olsson, two Swedish-born cousins who are writers of children's literature and young-adult fiction
- Elin Jacobsson (1886–1978), Swedish civil engineer
- Emma Jacobsson (1883–1977), Austrian-born Swedish botanist, art historian, knitwear designer and entrepreneur
- Frank Jacobsson (1930–2017), Swedish football winger
- Jonas Jacobsson (born 1965), Swedish sport shooter who has won several gold medals at the Paralympic Games
- Lars Jacobsson (footballer) (born 1960), Swedish football manager and former player
- Maj Jacobsson (1909–1996), Swedish athlete
- Oscar Jacobsson (1889–1945), Swedish comic creator and cartoonist who started his career in 1918
- Per Jacobsson (1894–1963), managing director of the International Monetary Fund 1956–1963
- Selma Jacobsson (1841–1899), Swedish photographer
- Skotte Jacobsson (1888–1964), Swedish track and field athlete who competed in the 1912 Summer Olympics
- Sven Jacobsson (1914–1983), Swedish football midfielder
- Ulla Jacobsson (1929–1982), Swedish actress, played one of the very few female roles in the film Zulu

== See also ==
- Jacobson (surname)
- Jakobson (surname)
- Jakobsson
- Jacobsen (surname)
- Jacobs (surname)
