= Jacobsen (surname) =

Origin
- Meaning: "son of Jacob"
- Region of origin: Norway, Denmark, Netherlands

Other names
- Variant form: Jacobson

Jacobsen is a Danish, Norwegian and Dutch patronymic surname meaning "son of Jacob". The prefix derives from the biblical given name Yaakov ("supplanter" or "follower"). The cognate Jakobsen is less common. The English language patronymic surname Jacobson is a parallel form, of which the earliest records are found in Huntingdon in 1244. Scandinavian immigrants to English-speaking countries often changed the spelling to Jacobson in order to accommodate English orthographic rules. Notable people with the surname include:

- Alice Jacobsen (1928–1993), American sculptor
- Allan Jacobsen (rugby union) (born 1978), Scottish rugby union player
- Allan Jacobsen (cyclist) (born 1955), Danish cyclist
- Allan Jacobsen (Australian footballer) (1916–1995), Australian rules footballer
- Anders Jacobsen (footballer) (born 1968), Norwegian footballer
- Anders Jacobsen (ski jumper) (born 1985), Norwegian ski jumper
- Anker Jacobsen (1911–1975), Danish tennis player
- Anna Jacobsen (1924–2004), Norwegian champion of Southern Sami language and culture
- Annie Jacobsen, American investigative journalist and author
- Arne Jacobsen (1902–1971), Danish architect and designer
- Astrid Jacobsen (born 1987), Norwegian cross-country skier
- Bernhard M. Jacobsen (1862–1936), Congressman from Iowa, USA
- Bo Jacobsen (born 1948), Danish chess master
- Carl Jacobsen (1842–1914), CEO Carlsberg brewery
- Casey Jacobsen (born 1981), American basketball player
- Christian Høgni Jacobsen (born 1980), Faroese football striker
- Claus Jacobsen (born 1971), Danish former motorcycle speedway rider
- Cyndy Jacobsen (born 1960), American politician
- Douglas Jacobsen, American religious scholar
- Edva Jacobsen, (born 1964), Faroese economist and politician
- Eric Jacobsen (basketball) (born 1994), American basketball player
- Eric Jacobsen (conductor) (born 1982), American conductor and cellist
- Erik Jacobsen (born 1940), American record producer
- Fritz Jacobsen (1894–1981), World War I flying ace
- Florence S. Jacobsen (1913–2017), sixth general president of the Young Women's Mutual Improvement Association of The Church of Jesus Christ of Latter-day Saints
- Gay Jacobsen D'Asaro (born 1954), American foil fencer
- Henry Jacobsen (1898–1964), Norwegian politician
- Holger Jacobsen (1876–1960), Danish architect
- Jens Bjerre Jacobsen (1903–1986), Danish composer and organist
- J. C. Jacobsen (1811–1887), Danish industrialist who founded Carlsberg brewery
- Jens Peter Jacobsen (1847–1885), Danish novelist, poet, and scientist
- Johan Jacobsen (1912–1972), Danish film director
- Jón Rói Jacobsen (born 1983), Faroese football defender
- Jørgen-Frantz Jacobsen (1900–1938), Faroese writer
- Joseph Jacobsen (born 1987), American pair skater
- Josephine Jacobsen (1908–2003), American author
- Julie Jacobsen (politician) (born 1985), Danish politician
- Karen Jacobsen, Australian-born American entertainer
- Ken Jacobsen (born 1945), American politician
- Kevin Jacobsen (born 1937), Australian entertainment businessman
- Kevin J. Jacobsen (born 1958), American brigadier general
- Kirsten Jacobsen (1942–2010), Danish politician
- Lars Jacobsen (born 1979), Danish footballer
- Lis Jacobsen (1882–1961), Danish philologist, archaeologist and writer
- Mette Jacobsen (born 1973), Danish Olympic swimmer
- Nicolas Jacobsen, American hacker
- Nils Kristen Jacobsen (1908–1993), Norwegian politician
- Pål Jacobsen (born 1956), Norwegian football coach, former player
- Pætur Dam Jacobsen (born 1982), Faroese footballer
- Peder Nikolai Leier Jacobsen (1888–1967), Norwegian politician
- Per Inge Jacobsen (born 1981), Norwegian football manager
- Peter Jacobsen (1950–2002), English jazz pianist
- Peter Jacobsen (born 1954), American golfer
- Rógvi Jacobsen (born 1979), Faroese football (soccer) striker
- Rolf Jacobsen (boxer) (1899–1960), Norwegian boxer
- Rolf Jacobsen (1907–1994), Norwegian author
- Rolf Jacobsen (politician) (1865–1942), Norwegian jurist and politician
- Roy Jacobsen (1954–2025), Norwegian writer
- Rune Angell-Jacobsen (born 1947), Norwegian novelist
- Solveig Gunbjörg Jacobsen, first person born south of the Antarctic Convergence
- Stein Jacobsen (born 1950), Norwegian-American geochemist
- Steinbjørn B. Jacobsen (1937–2012), Faroese poet, teacher and writer
- Stephen Jacobsen, American bioengineer
- Stephanie Jacobsen (born 1980), actress
- Thomas Jacobsen (footballer) (born 1983), Norwegian footballer
- Thomas Jacobsen (sailor) (born 1972), Danish sailor
- Thomas Jacobsen (sledge hockey) (born 1987)
- Thorkild Jacobsen (1904–1993), Danish-born historian and specialist in Assyriology and the Epic of Gilgamesh
- Uwe Jacobsen (born 1940), German swimmer
- Wayne Jacobsen (born 1953), American author
- Will Jacobsen (born 1988), American basketball player
- William S. Jacobsen (1887–1955), Congressman from Iowa, USA

== See also ==
- Jakobsen
