= Jacobson (surname) =

Origin
- Meaning: "son of Jacob"

Other names
- Variant forms: Jacobsen, Jakobson

Jacobson is an English language patronymic surname meaning "son of Jacob". The prefix is an Ashkenazic variation of the Latin Jacobus, itself derived from the Hebrew language given name Yaakov ("supplanter" or "follower"). The suffix, -son denotes "son/descendant of". There are several variants. The earliest record of the surname is found in Cambridgeshire in 1273.

People with the surname Jacobson include:

- Abbi Jacobson (born 1984), American comedian, actress and writer'
- Allan S. Jacobson (1932–1997), American astrophysicist
- Amy Jacobson (born 1969), television reporter for WMAQ News in Chicago
- Andrew Jacobson (born 1985), Major League Soccer player
- Arthur Jacobson (1901–1993), American assistant director
- Ben Jacobson (born 1970), American college basketball coach
- Bill Jacobson (born 1955), American photographer
- Brandon Jacobson (born 2003), American chess player
- Brent Jacobson (born 1984), Wisconsin politician
- Cecil Jacobson (1936–2021), disgraced American fertility doctor
- Clayton Jacobson II (1933–2022), credited with inventing the personal water craft
- Dan Jacobson (1929–2014), South African writer
- Dana Jacobson (born 1971), American news anchor
- David Jacobson (diplomat) (born 1951), lawyer and former United States Ambassador to Canada
- Douglas T. Jacobson (1925–2000), US Marine who was awarded the Medal of Honor
- Edmund Jacobson, American physician, creator of the Jacobson's Progressive Muscle Relaxation technique
- Edward Jacobson (1891–1955), Jewish American businessman and activist
- Edith Jacobson (1897–1978), German psychoanalyst
- Emily Jacobson (born 1985), American sabre fencer
- Eric Jacobson (born 1971), American puppeteer
- Erin M. Jacobson American attorney specializing in music industry intellectual property
- Ethel Jacobson (American writer) (1899–1991), American poet
- Ethel Jacobson (editor) (1877–1965), New Zealand journalist and editor
- Freddie Jacobson (born 1974), Swedish golfer
- Georgiy Jacobson (1871–1926), Russian entomologist
- Hal Jacobson (born 1950), American politician
- Harvey Jacobson (born 1956), British businessman
- Howard Jacobson (born 1942), British author
- Israel Jacobson (1768–1828), German philanthropist and reformer
- Ivar Jacobson (born 1939), Swedish computer scientist
- Jacob F. Jacobson (1849–1938), American businessman and politician
- Jeff Jacobson (Ohio), American politician, Ohio Republican state senator
- Jenna Jacobson (born 1982), Wisconsin politician
- Jill Jacobson (1954–2024), American actress
- Joe Jacobson (born 1986), Welsh footballer
- Joel Jacobson (born 1951), American curler
- John G. Jacobson (1869–1929), American businessman and politician
- John Christian Jacobson, Moravian bishop in the United States
- Joseph Jacobson (born 1965), American inventor
- Judy Jacobson (1939–2019), American politician
- Leonard Jacobson (1921–1992), American museum architect
- Louisa Jacobson (born 1991), American actress and model
- Ludwig Lewin Jacobson (1783–1843), Danish surgeon
  - Jacobson's cartilage
  - Jacobson’s nerve
  - Jacobson's organ
- Marcey Jacobson (1911–2009), American photographer
- Mark Z. Jacobson (born 1965), professor of civil and environmental engineering
- Max Jacobson (1900–1979), American physician and amphetamine addict
- Nathan Jacobson (1910–1999), American mathematician
  - Jacobson's conjecture
  - Jacobson density theorem
  - Jacobson radical
  - Jacobson ring
- Norm Jacobson (1917–1994), rugby league footballer
- Oscar Jacobson (1882–1966), Swedish-born American painter and museum curator
- Peter Marc Jacobson (born 1957), American television writer, director and producer
- Peter Jacobson (born 1965), American film and television actor
- Peter Jacobson (judge), Federal Court of Australia judge
- Richard Jacobson (1923–2000), birth name of American actor Rick Jason
- Richard Jacobson (born 1959), Canadian artist
- Robert Jacobson (born 1940), former Lutheran Bishop who became a Catholic priest
- Robert M. Jacobson (born 1958), American physician
- Roberta S. Jacobson (born 1960), American diplomat
- Roman Jakobson or Jacobson (1896–1982), Russian linguist
- Sada Jacobson (born 1983), American sabre fencer
- Sam Jacobson (born 1975), American basketball player
- Sydney Jacobson (1908–1988), British journalist and editor
- Van Jacobson, American scientist and network specialist
- Walter Jacobson (born 1937), American TV and radio personality
- William Jacobson (1803–1884), British Anglican bishop
- William A. Jacobson, American attorney, Cornell Law School professor, and blogger
- Zach Jacobson (born 1984), American curler

== See also ==
- Jakobson (surname)
- Jakobsson
- Jacobsen (surname)
