= Jakobsen =

Jakobsen is both a surname and a given name. Notable people with the name include:

== Surname ==
- Alf E. Jakobsen (born 1952), Norwegian politician
- Anna Sofie Jakobsen (1860–1913), Norwegian Christian missionary
- Annika Jakobsen (born 1997), Danish handballer
- Carolyn Jakobsen (born 1947), Australian politician
- Egon Jakobsen (born 1948), Danish politician
- Else Marie Jakobsen (1927–2012), Norwegian designer and textile artist
- Fabio Jakobsen (born 1996), Dutch cyclist
- Frode Jakobsen (1906–1997), Danish politician
- Gidsken Jakobsen (1908–1990), Norwegian aviation pioneer
- Gunnar Jakobsen (1916–1992), Norwegian politician
- Hans Jakobsen (1895–1980), Danish gymnast
- Helge Jakobsen (1901–1996), Norwegian politician
- Henning Lynge Jakobsen (born 1962), Danish canoer
- Henrik Jakobsen (handballer) (born 1992), Norwegian handball player
- Henrik Jakobsen (curler), Danish curler
- Henrik Plenge Jakobsen (born 1967), Danish conceptual artist
- Jakob Jakobsen (1864–1918), Faroese linguist
- Jasna Jakobsen, Norwegian wind engineer
- Jóannes Jakobsen (born 1961), Faroese footballer
- Johan J. Jakobsen (1937–2018), Norwegian politician
- Jonny Jakobsen (born 1963), Swedish musician
- Lars Jakobsen (born 1961), Danish footballer
- Lynge Jakobsen (born 1950), Danish footballer
- Michael Jakobsen (born 1986), Danish footballer
- Mimi Jakobsen (born 1948), Danish politician
- Mini Jakobsen (born 1965), Norwegian footballer
- Øistein Jakobsen (1907–1947), Norwegian politician
- Ólavur Jakobsen (born 1964), Faroese guitarist
- Ole Jakobsen (1942–2010), Danish chess master
- Simon Jakobsen (born 1990), Danish footballer
- Svend Jakobsen (1935–2022), Danish politician
- Tariq Jakobsen (born 1974), Danish graphic design artist
- Thomas Jakobsen (21st century), Danish mathematician

== Given name ==
- Knut Severin Jakobsen Vik (1892–1972), Norwegian politician
- Olav Jakobsen Høyem (1830–1899), Norwegian teacher

== See also ==
- Jacobsen (disambiguation)
- Jakobson (disambiguation)
- Jameson (name)
