= Jakob Jakobsen =

Faroese linguist and scholar

Jákup Jakobsen
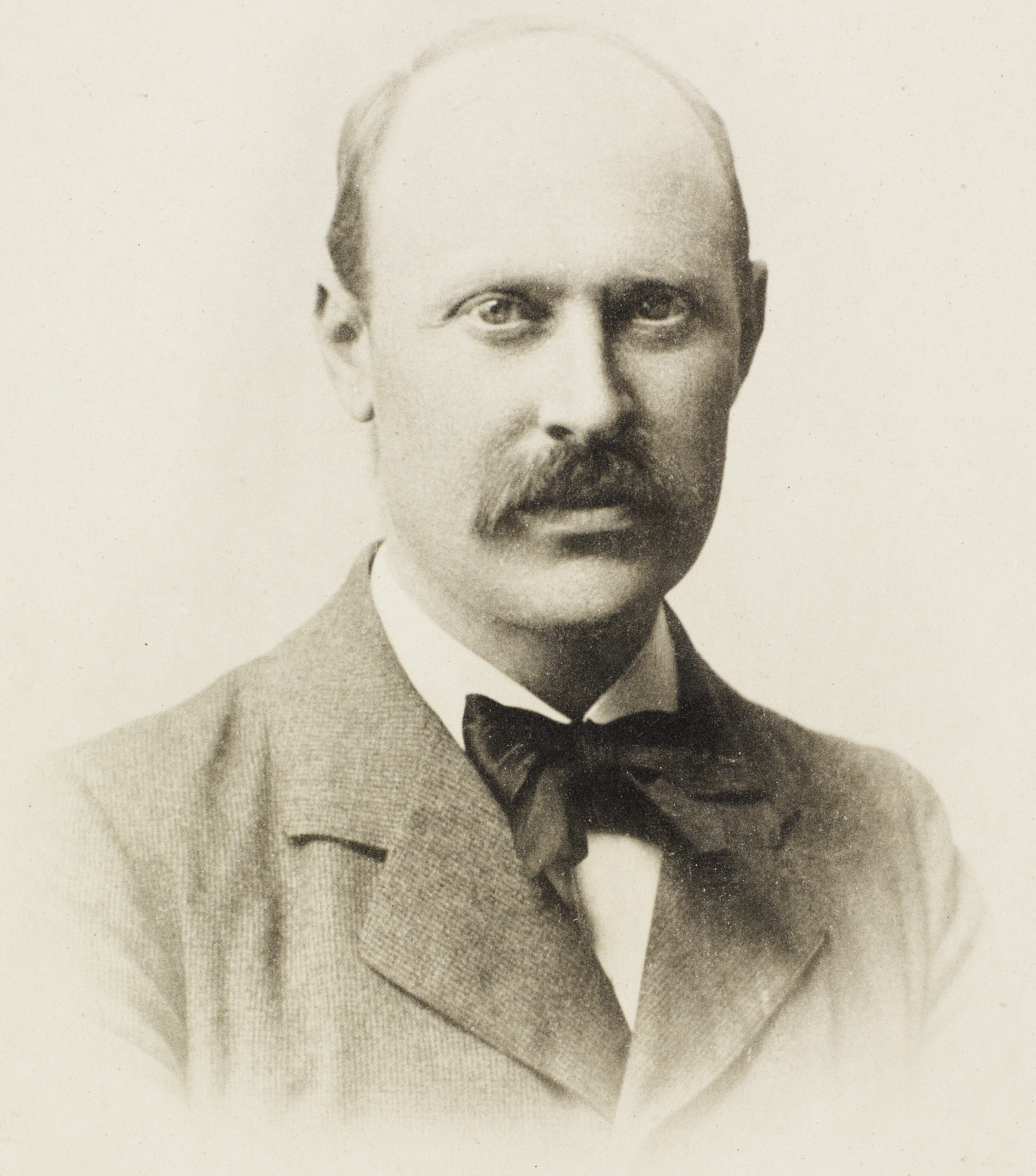
- Born: 22 February 1864; Tórshavn, Faroe Islands
- Died: 15 August 1918 (aged 54)
- Occupation: Philologist
- Title: Doctor

Jakob Jakobsen (22 February 1864 — 15 August 1918) was a Faroese linguist and scholar. The first Faroe Islander to earn a doctoral degree, his thesis on the Norn language of Shetland was a major contribution to its historical preservation.

In addition, he was known for his contributions to the Faroese language and its literature, most notably his conflict with Venceslaus Ulricus Hammershaimb over the development of the Faroese orthography, in which he unsuccessfully advocated for the adoption of a phonetic writing system.

== Life ==
Jakob Jakobsen's parents were Hans Nicolai Jacobsen from Tórshavn, and Johanne Marie Hansdatter from Sandoy. Jakob was the youngest of three children, having two older sisters. Their father, H. N. Jacobsen, earned his living as a bookbinder and also ran a bookshop in Tórshavn. The original bookshop was in the old town, but H. N. Jacobsen moved the shop in 1918, to a central location further uptown, where it still stands today, retaining its traditional Faroese grass roof. Founded in 1865, H. N. Jacobsens Bókahandil is one of the oldest shops still in business in the Faroe Islands today.

Jakob Jakobsen went to the “realskolen” school in Torshavn, where he showed a natural talent for learning languages. At the age of thirteen he went to school in Denmark and finished college in Herlufsholm in 1883. In 1891 he graduated with Danish as his main subject and French and Latin as subsidiary subjects. In 1897 he earned a doctorate with his work “det norrøne sprog på Shetland” (the Norse language in Shetland).

Later in life, one of Jakobsen's sisters played a great role in her brother's life in Copenhagen; after his death, she translated his Shetland works into English, in accordance with Jakobsen's own plans.

== Jakobsen and Faroese ==
J. Jakobsen's work within the field of Faroese folklore and oral poetry played an important role in the rise of modern Faroese written literature. This is the case most of all with his collection of Faroese legends and folktales, Færøske Folkesagn og Æventyr. He looked upon folk tales as a kind of fictional literature, while the legends to him were a kind of source about early Faroese history. He also collected oral poetry, worked with Faroese place-names and created many neologisms. He was the first to point out some Celtic place-names in the Faroes, and is also responsible for the grammar section and texts-samples in the 1891 Færøsk Anthologi edited by V. U. Hammershaimb.

In 1898 J. Jakobsen proposed a new Faroese orthography based on a then new science, phonetics. The principle of the 1898 orthography is that there must be a one-to-one correspondence between phoneme and letter, and that the written language should be easy to learn by children. Due to political controversy, the proposal was abandoned.

== Jakobsen and Shetland ==
Jakob Jakobsen is a key figure in Shetland's culture. As John J. Graham writes in his preface to the 2nd edition, his "Dictionary of the Norn Language in Shetland" is the unrivaled source-book of information on the origins and usage of the Shetland tongue. Based on Jakobsen's fieldwork in Shetland during 1893–95, it first appeared in Danish in four volumes between 1908 and 1921, and was subsequently published in English in two volumes, 1928 and 1932. The dictionary has established itself internationally as a major work of scholarship in Scandinavian philology. In 1985 The Shetland Folk Society, of which Graham was president at the time, succeeded in finding funds to reprint the two volume English edition in facsimile.

When Jakobsen left the Faroes for Leith near Edinburgh, his only knowledge of the language of Shetland was drawn from Thomas Edmondston's glossary and those parts of George Stewart's Shetland Fireside Tales that are written in Shetland dialect. In Edinburgh he met Gilbert Goudie, and there he read "a valuable manuscript supplement" to Edmondston's work written by Thomas Barclay. He arrived in Shetland in 1893 and during his field work there he interviewed a large number of Shetland dialect speakers and scholars, including Haldane Burgess, James Stout Angus, John Irvine, Robert Jamieson (1827-1899), James Inkster, John Nicolson, and Laurence Williamson.

Jakobsen's correspondence with Goudie was edited by E. S. Reid Tait and published in 1953. In 1981, Roy Grønneberg published a study entitled Jakobsen and Shetland.
