= Estonian Braille =

Braille system for Estonian language

- Script type: alphabet
- Print basis: Estonian alphabet
- Languages: Estonian

Related scripts
- Parent systems: Braille: French/Scandinavian Braille; Estonian Braille

Estonian Braille is the braille alphabet of the Estonian language.

== Alphabet ==
Estonian Braille uses the international (read French) norms for the letters ä ö ü. Š and ž are mirror-images of s and z, a strategy found in other alphabets. Õ is the mirror-image of ä, as the mirror-image of o is used for ö.

a	b	d	e	f	g	h	i	j
k	l	m	n	o	p	r	s	š
z	ž	t	u	v	õ	ä	ö	ü

When c q w x y are used in foreign names, they have their normal values of ⠉⠟⠺⠭⠽.

== Punctuation ==
Punctuation is nearly identical to that of Finnish Braille.

,	.	'	?	!	;	:	-	*	/

... “ ... ”	... ( ... )	... [ ... ]

== Formatting ==
(digit)	(caps)	(italics)	(bold)
