= Museum architecture =

Museum architecture has been of increasing importance over the centuries, especially more recently.

A challenge for museum architecture is the differing purposes of the building. The museum collection must be preserved, but it also needs to be made accessible to the public. Climate control may be very important for the objects in the collection.

== History ==
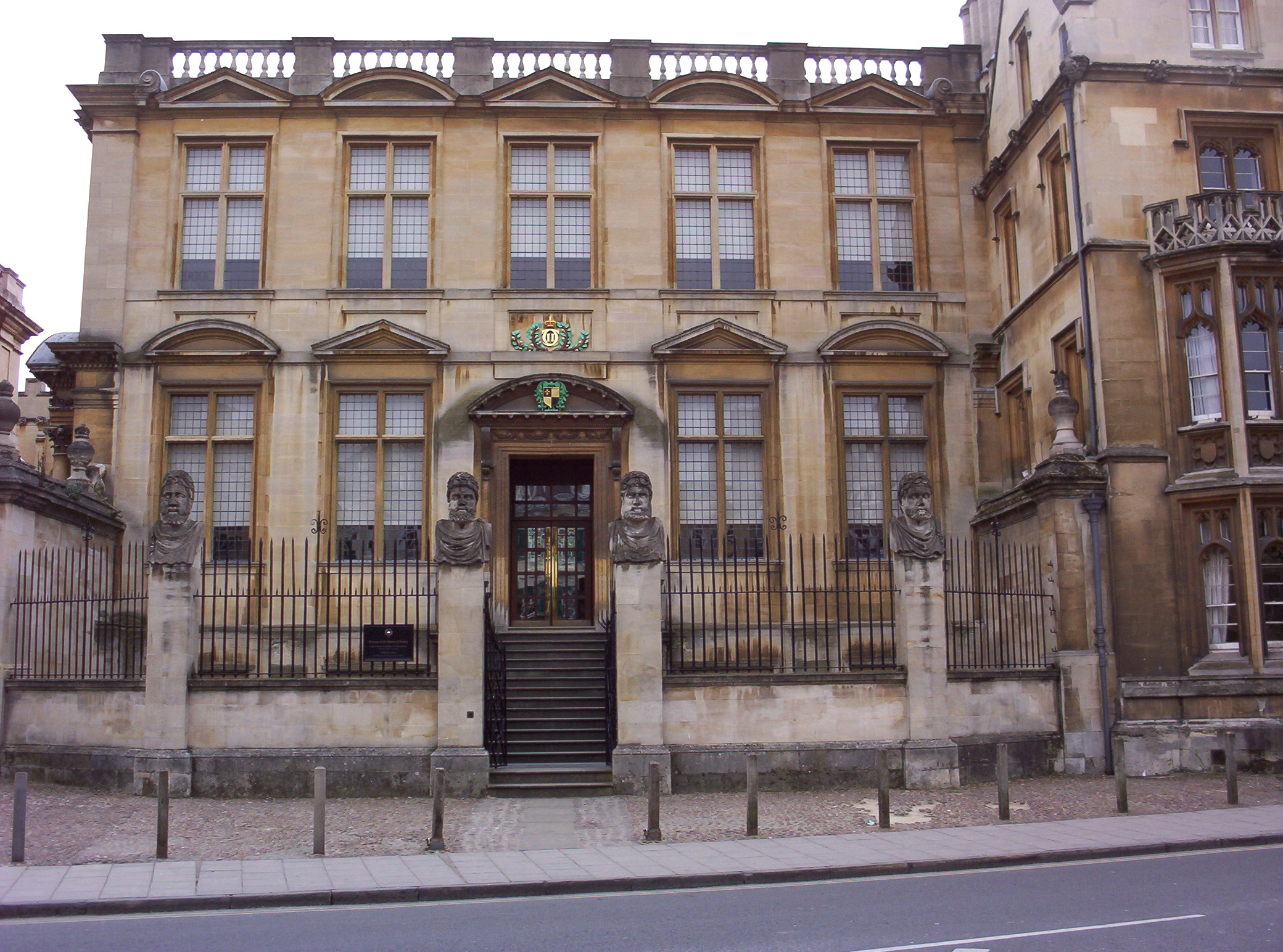
The Old Ashmolean building in Oxford, an early example of purpose-built museum architecture

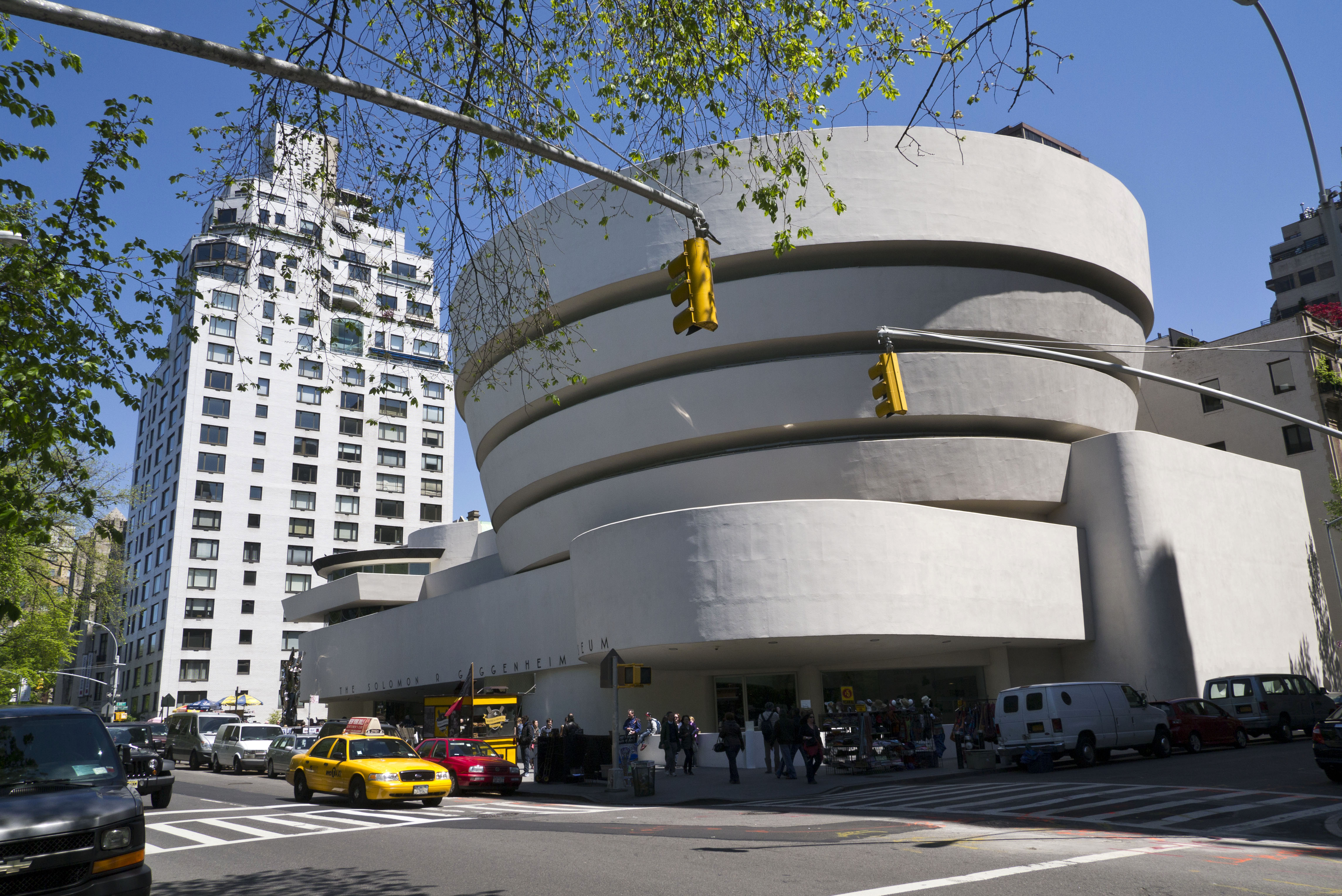
The Solomon R. Guggenheim Museum in New York City, designed by Frank Lloyd Wright and opened in 1959

An early example of architecture for a purpose-built museum is the Museum of the History of Science building in Oxford, England, originally built to house the Ashmolean Museum.

In the 20th century, museums have been combined with war memorials to serve multiple purposes. The Australian War Memorial in Canberra, for example, is a place of commemoration as well as for collection and display. It contains a museum, an archive and a shrine. It was designed by Emil Sodersten and John Crust in a contemporary neoclassical style reminiscent of Lutyens with detailing influenced by Art Deco.

The Solomon R. Guggenheim Museum in New York City, USA (opened in 1959), by Frank Lloyd Wright is an important architectural landmark and icon of the 20th century. Another classic 20th century example of iconic museum architecture is the titanium-covered Guggenheim Museum Bilbao in Spain by Frank Gehry (opened in 1997). Gehry has undertaken many major museum architecture projects, including the Experience Music Project in Seattle, USA, the Weisman Art Museum in Minneapolis, USA, the Vitra Design Museum and MARTa Museum in Germany, and the Art Gallery of Ontario in Toronto, Canada.

Successful examples of modern architecture being married with existing museum buildings include the Louvre Pyramid by I. M. Pei in Paris, France (1989), and more recently the Queen Elizabeth II Great Court by Norman Foster at the British Museum, London, England (2000).

David Chipperfield designed many notable museums, including the award-winning River and Rowing Museum in Henley-on-Thames, England, in 1997. This won in 1999 the RIBA Architecture in Arts and Leisure Award and the Royal Fine Art Commission Trust/British Sky Broadcasting Best Building Award (England). Chipperfield also designed the Figge Art Museum in Davenport, Iowa, USA (2005), the Museum of Modern Literature in Marbach, Germany (2006), and the reconstructed Neues Museum in Berlin, Germany (2009).

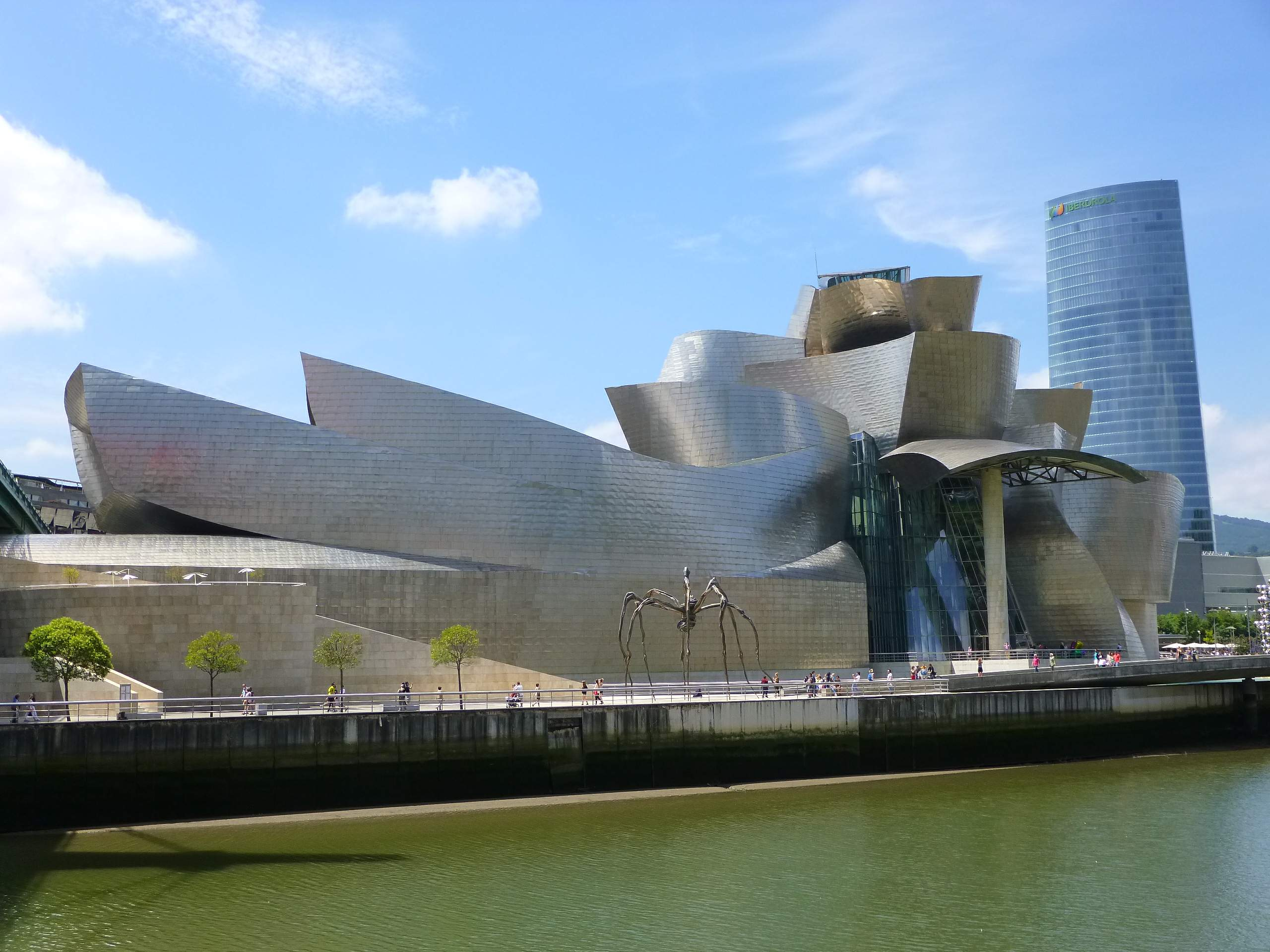
The Guggenheim Museum Bilbao, Spain

Museum architecture sometimes involves the conversion of old buildings that have outlived their usefulness but that are still of historic interest. A notable example is the Dalí Theatre and Museum or the conversion of the Bankside Power Station designed by Sir Giles Gilbert Scott into the Tate Modern in 2000, based on designs by Herzog & de Meuron. Information about the conversion was the basis for a 2008 documentary Architects Herzog and de Meuron: Alchemy of Building & Tate Modern.

Finegold Alexander Architects, an architecture firm based in Boston, Massachusetts, USA, established in 1962, has undertaken museum architecture projects including Ellis Island National Monument and Museum (Associated Architects with Beyer Blinder Belle Architects) and the United States Holocaust Memorial Museum (Associated Architects with Pei Cobb Freed & Partners).

== Architects ==
As well as the architects mentioned above, other architects notable for their contributions to museum architecture include:

- Philip Freelon (Smithsonian National Museum of African American History and Culture, 2003, USA; the Museum of the African Diaspora, 2005, USA)
- Leonard Jacobson (East Building of the National Gallery of Art, Washington, D.C., 1978, USA; West Wing of the Museum of Fine Arts, Boston, Massachusetts, 1981, USA; Portland Museum of Art, Portland, Maine, 1982, USA; the Louvre, 1980s/90s, Paris, France)
- Kengo Kuma (Kitakami Canal Museum, Tokyo, 1994, Japan; Suntory Museum of Art, 2007, Japan; V&A at Dundee, Dundee, 2010, Scotland)
- Akira Kuryu (Uemura Naomi Memorial Museum, 1994, Japan; Okazaki Mindscape Museum, 1996, Japan)
- Daniel Libeskind (Jewish Museum, Berlin 1989–1999, Imperial War Museum North 1997–2001, Royal Ontario Museum (extension), 2002–2007)
- SANAA
- Katayama Tōkuma (Nara National Museum, 1894, Japan; Kyoto Imperial Museum, 1895, now the Kyoto National Museum, Japan)
- Stanton Williams (Grand Musée d'Art, 2011, Nantes, France)

== Gallery ==
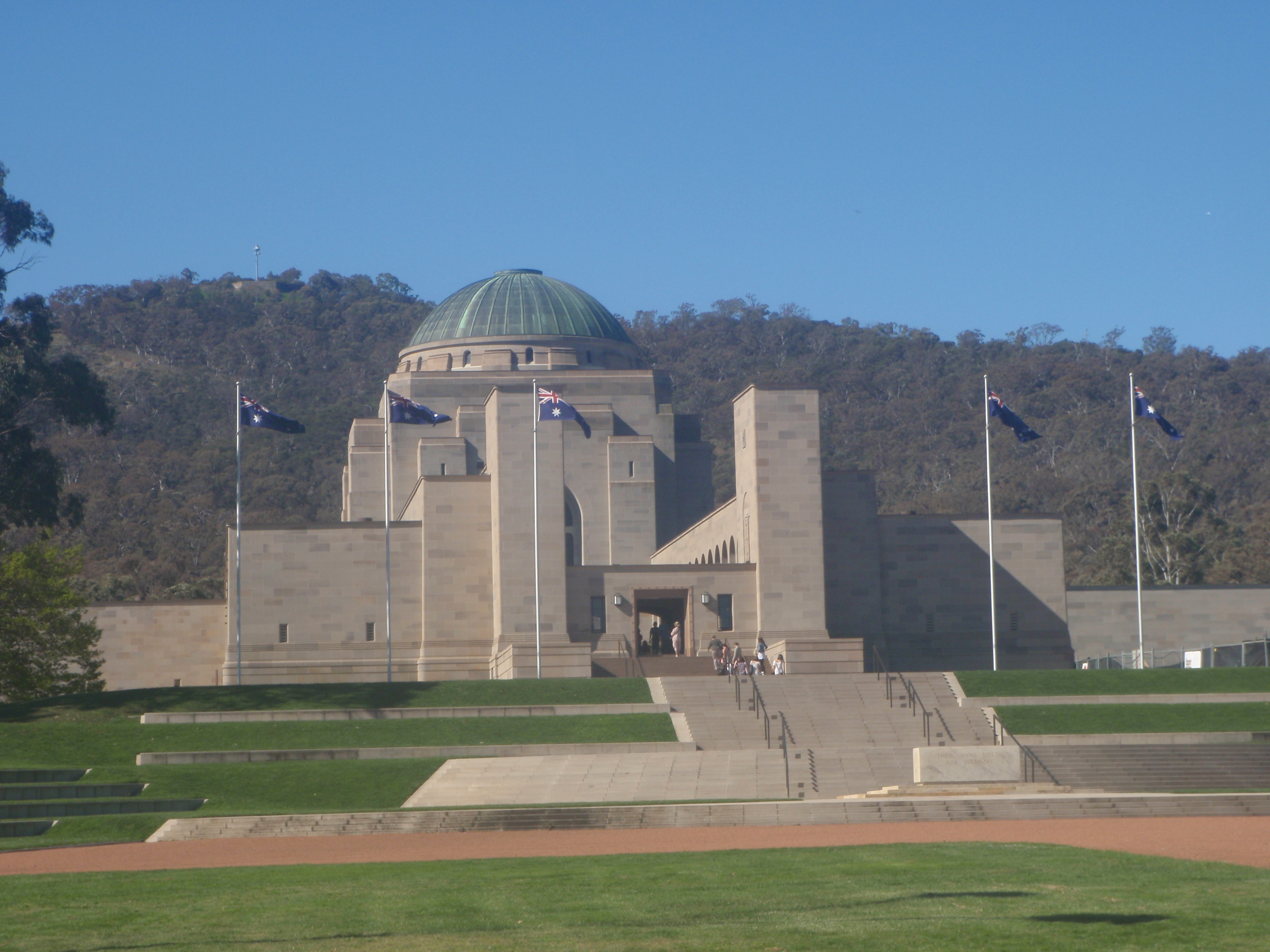
The Australian War Memorial, Canberra, including a national military museum, completed 1941, designed by Emil Sodersten and John Crust

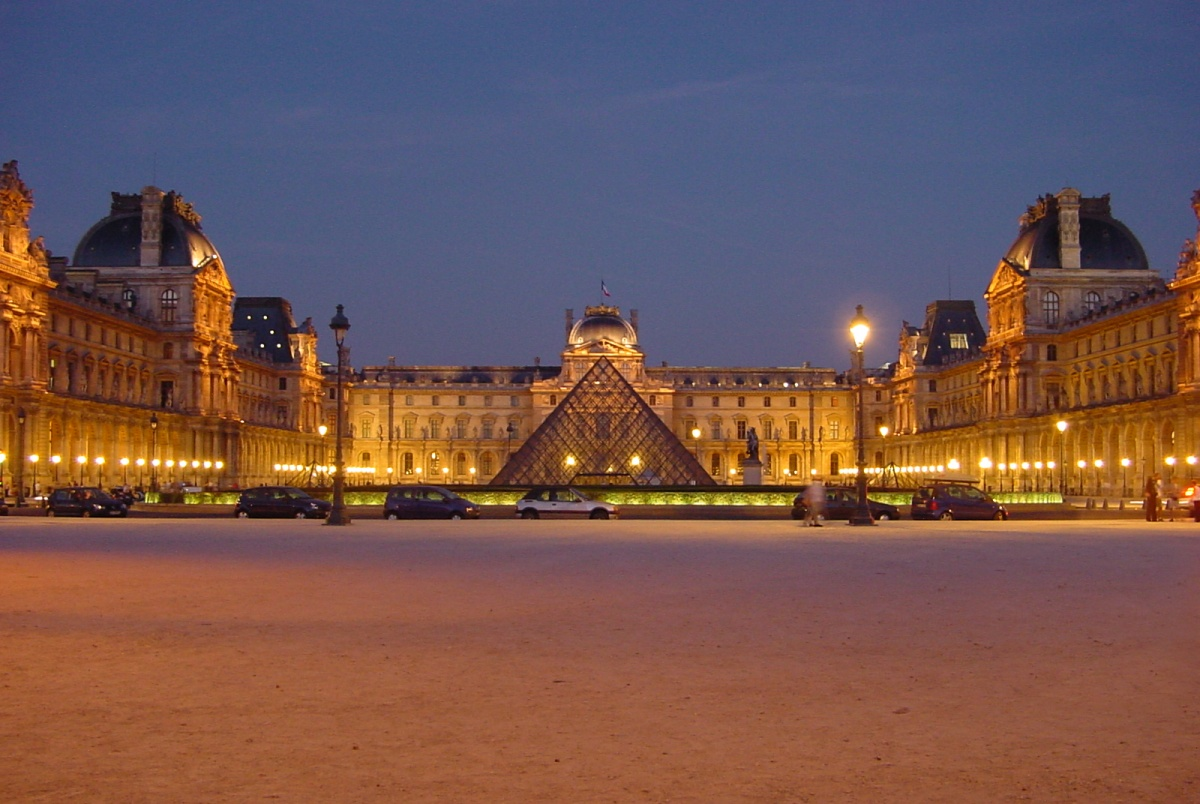
The Louvre Pyramid at the Louvre in Paris (1989)

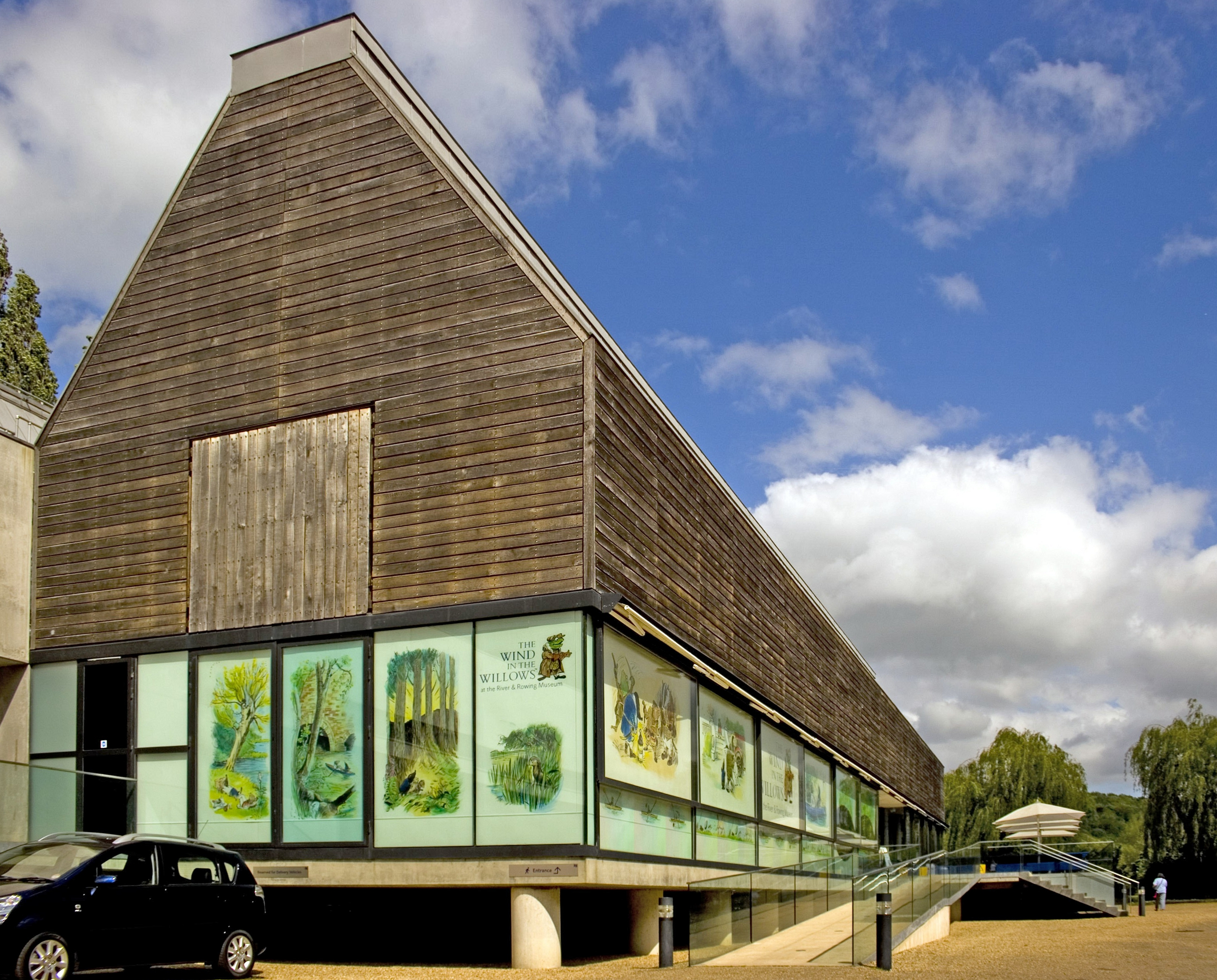
The River and Rowing Museum in Henley-on-Thames, designed by David Chipperfield and opened in 1997

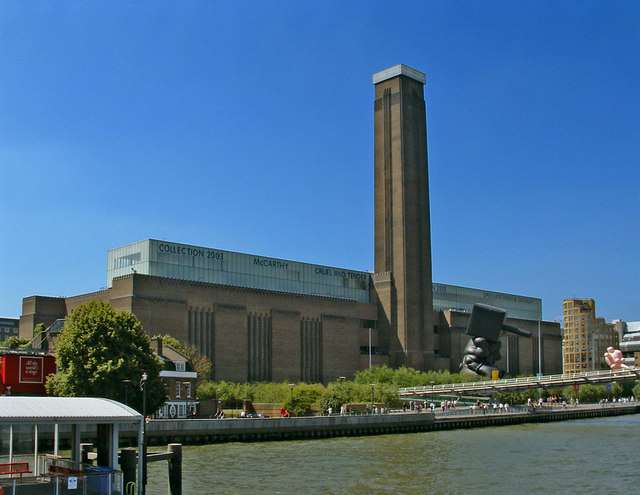
The Tate Modern in London, converted by Herzog & de Meuron in 2000

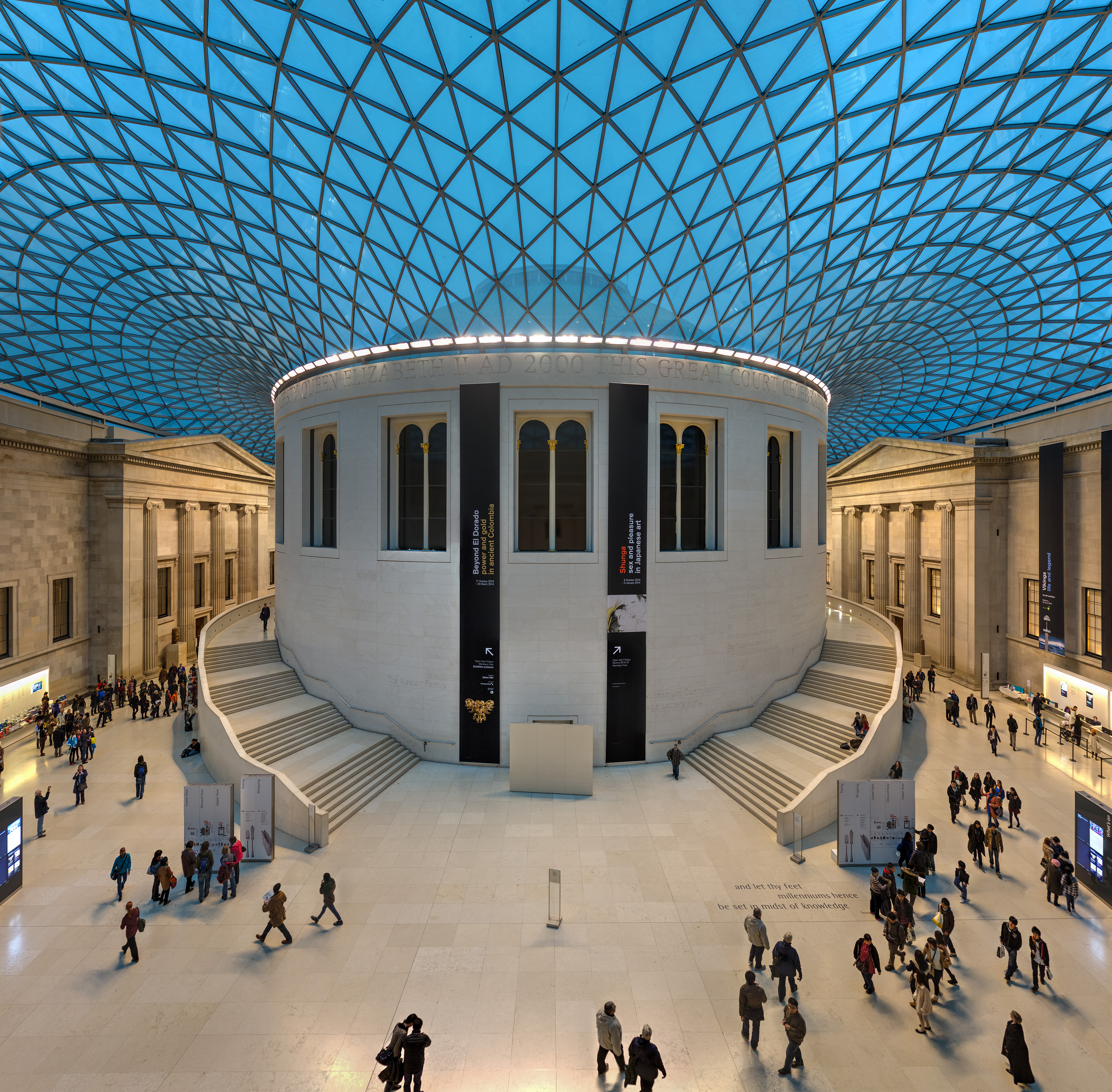
The Great Court at the British Museum, London (2000)

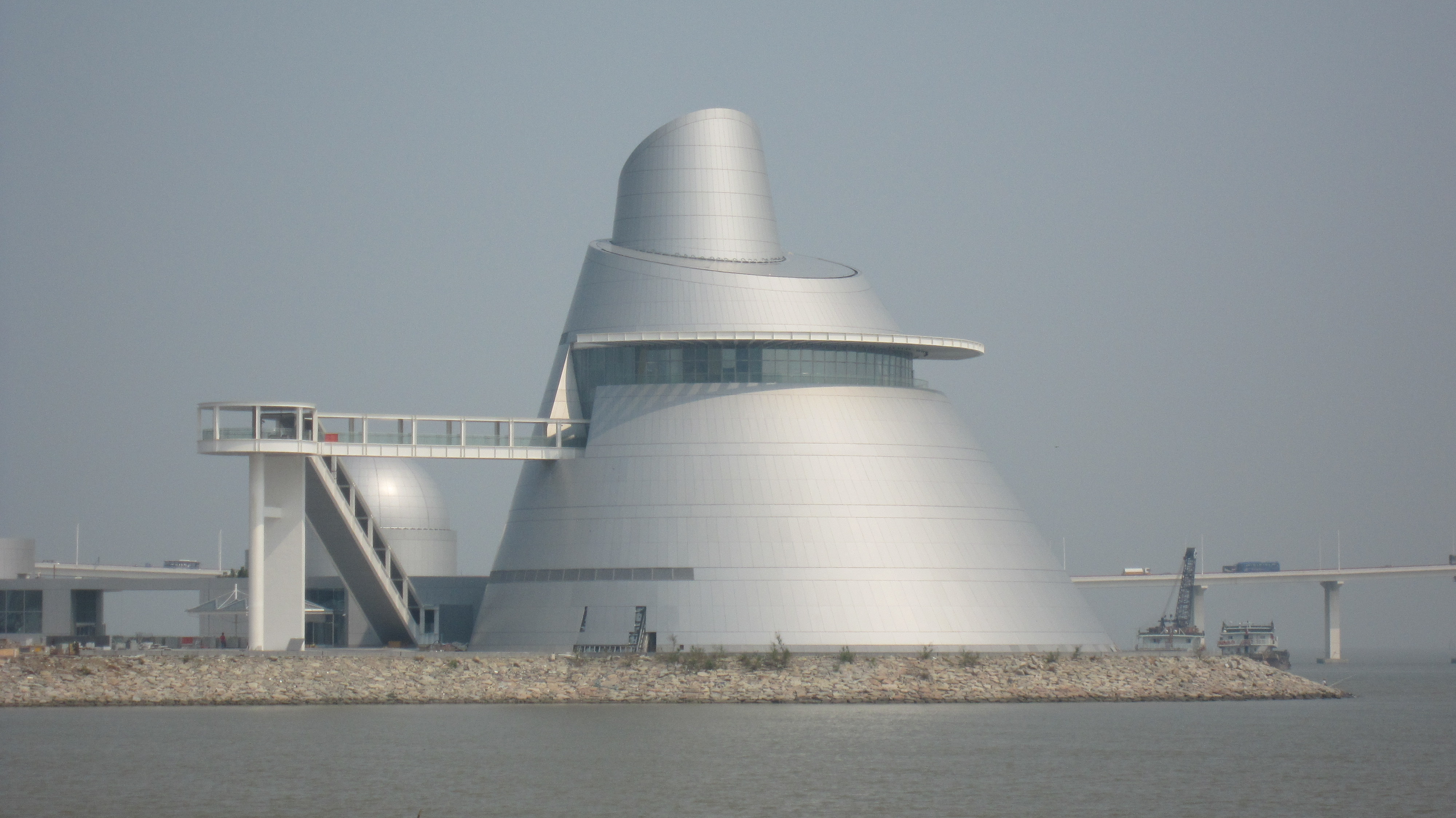
The Macao Science Center in Macau, designed by Pei Partnership Architects in association with I. M. Pei (2009)
