= Scandinavian Braille =

Braille alphabet used for the languages of the mainland Nordic countries

Danish Braille Norwegian Braille Swedish Braille Finnish Braille Greenlandic Braille
- Script type: alphabet
- Print basis: Dano-Norwegian alphabet Swedish alphabet
- Languages: Danish, Norwegian, Swedish, Finnish, Greenlandic

Related scripts
- Parent systems: Braille: French Braille; Danish Braille Norwegian Braille Swedish Braille Finnish Braille Greenlandic Braille

Scandinavian Braille is a braille alphabet used, with differences in orthography and punctuation, for the languages of the mainland Nordic countries: Danish, Norwegian, Swedish, and Finnish. In a generally reduced form it is used for Greenlandic.

Scandinavian Braille is very close to French Braille, with slight modification of some of the accented letters, and optional use of the others to transcribe foreign languages.

== Alphabet ==
The braille letters for the French print vowels â, œ, ä are used for the print vowels å, ö/ø, ä/æ of the Scandinavian alphabets. Each language uses the letters that exists in its inkprint alphabet. Thus, in numerical order, the letters are:

a	b	c	d	e	f	g	h	i	j
k	l	m	n	o	p	q	r	s	t
u	v	x	y	z	å	ö/ø	w	ä/æ	&

Greenlandic Braille uses a subset of these letters, a e f g i j k l m n o p q r s t u v, though the rest of the Scandinavian alphabet is available when needed.

For foreign accented letters, French Braille assignments are used.

== Numbers ==
Digits are the first ten letters of the alphabet, and numbers are marked by ⠼, as in English Braille.

== Punctuation ==
Punctuation differs slightly between each country, but this is unlikely to impede understanding.

Single punctuation

Print	,	.	'	?	!	;	:	*	-	—	/
Finnish	⠂ (braille pattern dots-2)	⠄ (braille pattern dots-3)	⠐ (braille pattern dots-5)	⠢ (braille pattern dots-26)	⠲ (braille pattern dots-256)	⠆ (braille pattern dots-23)	⠒ (braille pattern dots-25)	⠔ (braille pattern dots-35)	⠤ (braille pattern dots-36)	⠤ (braille pattern dots-36)	⠌ (braille pattern dots-34)
Swedish/ Norwegian	⠂ (braille pattern dots-2)	⠄ (braille pattern dots-3)	⠐ (braille pattern dots-5)	⠢ (braille pattern dots-26)	⠖ (braille pattern dots-235)	⠆ (braille pattern dots-23)	⠒ (braille pattern dots-25)	⠔ (braille pattern dots-35)	⠤ (braille pattern dots-36)	⠤ (braille pattern dots-36)	⠌ (braille pattern dots-34)
Danish/ Greenlandic	⠂ (braille pattern dots-2)	⠄ (braille pattern dots-3)	⠈ (braille pattern dots-4)	⠢ (braille pattern dots-26)	⠖ (braille pattern dots-235)	⠆ (braille pattern dots-23)	⠒ (braille pattern dots-25)	⠔ (braille pattern dots-35)	⠤ (braille pattern dots-36)	⠤ (braille pattern dots-36)	⠌ (braille pattern dots-34)

The ellipsis ⟨...⟩ is thus ⠄⠄⠄.

Finnish ⠲ ! is not a copy error. It is the reverse of the ⠖ found in all other Nordic countries, though the latter is the + sign in Finnish mathematical notation just as it is in those other countries. Finnish punctuation is used for Swedish text in Finland.

In Swedish Braille, there is also ⠸ for the pipe, |, and ⠿ for the bullet, •.

Paired punctuation

Print	“ ... ”	‘ ... ’	( ... )	[ ... ]
Finnish/ Swedish	...	...	...	...
Norwegian/Faroese	...	(?)	...	...
Danish/ Greenlandic	...	(?)	...	...

At least in Norwegian Braille, the braces { ... } are ⠠⠷...⠠⠾.

== Formatting ==
Given the poor coverage, it is not clear how compatible formatting is between countries. (See Estonian Braille for formatting in an orthography with similar punctuation to Finnish and Swedish.)

Print	(digit)	(caps)	(all caps)	(italics)	(bold)
Finnish/ Swedish	⠼ (braille pattern dots-3456)	⠠ (braille pattern dots-6)	⠠ (braille pattern dots-6)	⠠ (braille pattern dots-6) ⠄ (braille pattern dots-3)	⠨ (braille pattern dots-46)
Norwegian	⠼ (braille pattern dots-3456)	⠠ (braille pattern dots-6)	(?)	...	...
Danish/ Greenlandic	⠼ (braille pattern dots-3456)	⠨ (braille pattern dots-46)	⠸ (braille pattern dots-456)	⠰ (braille pattern dots-56)	(?)

In Swedish Braille, ⠠⠠ is used to capitalize an entire word, and ⠠⠠⠠ to capitalize several words. The sequences ⠠⠤ and ⠨⠨ are likewise used to italicize and bold several words. The end of any of these is marked with ⠱, for example ⠠⠠⠠ ... ⠱ for caps, ⠠⠤ ... ⠱ for italics, and ⠨⠨ ... ⠱ for bold.

Also in Swedish (and perhaps the others), the auxiliary parentheses ⠘⠦ ... ⠘⠴ are used to add comments that appear only in the braille text, such as a description of a picture in the print text being transcribed.

== See also ==
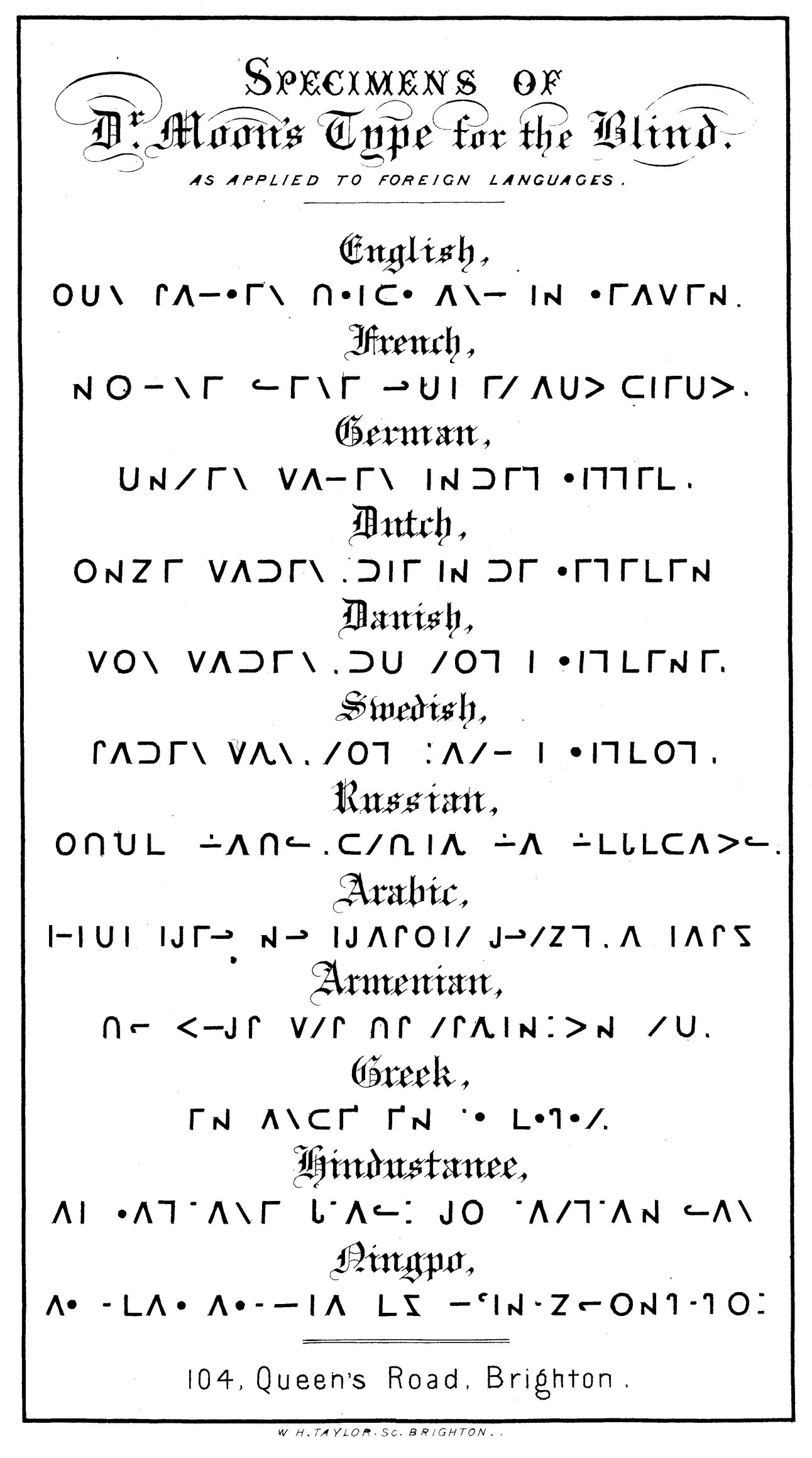
A sample of Moon type in various languages including Danish and Swedish.

- Estonian Braille
- Faroese Braille
- Icelandic Braille
- Northern Sámi Braille (Norway)
- Moon type is a simplification of the Latin alphabet for embossing. An adaptation for Danish- and Swedish-reading blind people has been proposed.
