= Venceslaus Ulricus Hammershaimb =

Faroese Lutheran minister (1819–1909)

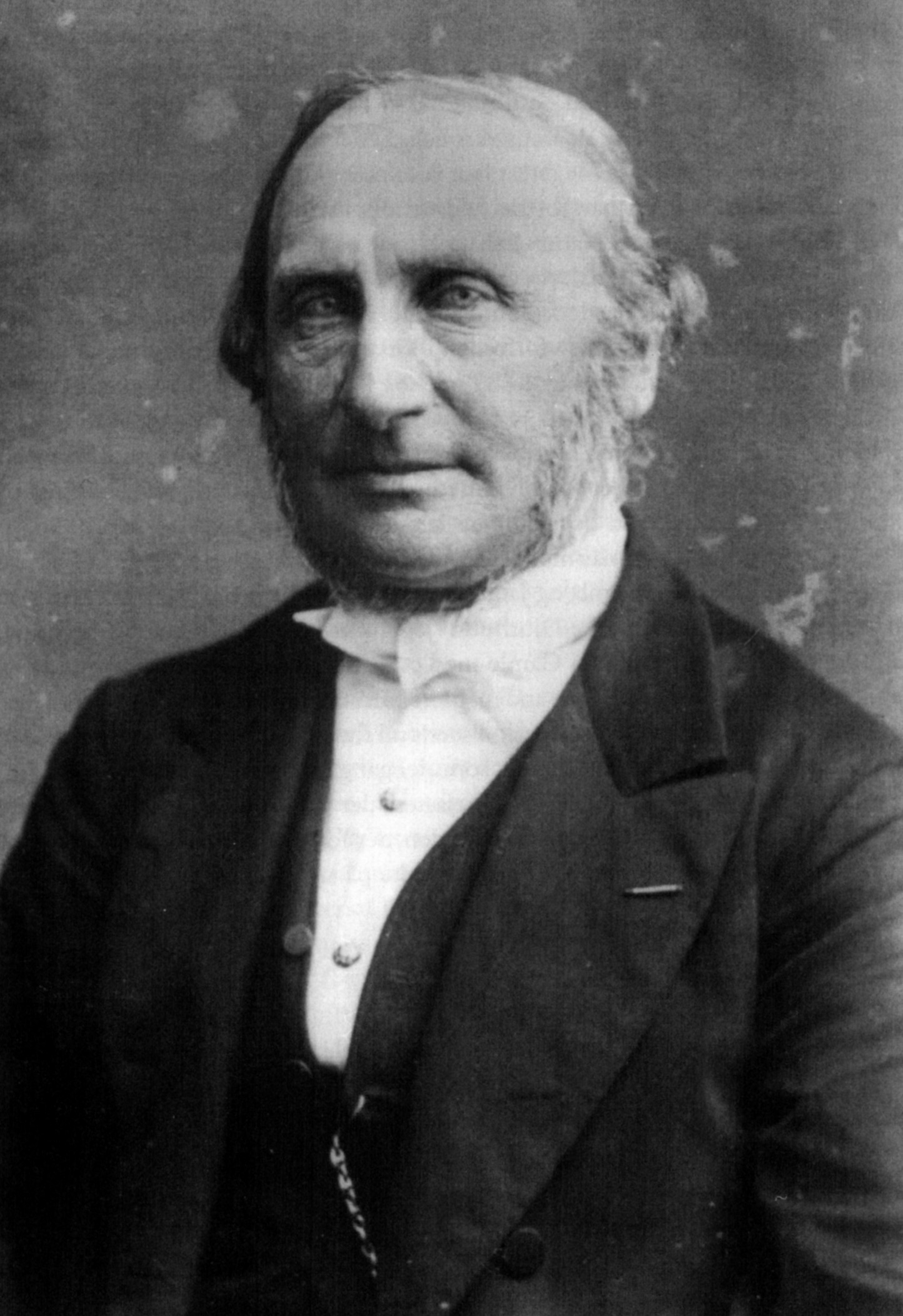
- Born: March 25, 1819; Sandavágur, Faroe Islands
- Died: April 8, 1909 (aged 90); Copenhagen, Denmark

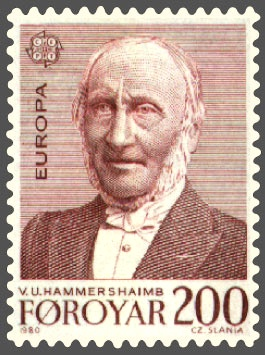
Faroe Islands stamp honoring Venceslaus Ulricus Hammershaimb

Venceslaus Ulricus Hammershaimb (Faroese pronunciation: [ˈvɛnsɛslɔus ˈulrikus ˈhamːəʂhaimp], Icelandic: [ˈvɛnsɛslɔis ˈʏltrɪkʏs ˈhamːɛrshaimp]; March 25, 1819 – April 8, 1909) was a Faroese Lutheran minister who established the modern orthography of Faroese – the language of the Faroe Islands – based on the Icelandic language, which like Faroese, derives from western dialects of Old Norse.

== Background ==
Hammershaimb was born in Sandavágur on the island of Vágar in the Faroe Islands. He was a Lutheran parish priest in Kvívík and a rural dean in Nes on the Faroese island of Eysturoy before settling in Denmark in 1878. In addition to his contributions to the written standard of Faroese, he was also a known folklorist. During the years 1847–1848, and again in 1853, he returned to the Faroe Islands to study the dialects and to collect the native ballads and folklore, which he published in 1851–1855 under the title of Færöiske Kvæder. In 1854, he published a grammar of Faroese.

== Faroese language ==
At one point, the language spoken in the Faroe Islands was Old West Norse, which Norwegian settlers had brought with them. Between the 9th and the 15th centuries, a distinct Faroese language evolved, although it was still intelligible to speakers of Old West Norse. It would have been closely related to the Norn language of Orkney and Shetland. However, for some 300 years until the 19th century, under the dual kingdom of Denmark–Norway, Danish was the language of religion, education, and administration in the Faroe Islands.

Hammershaimb created his spelling system for Faroese in 1846. It was etymological, with the vowels based on written Icelandic, rather than phonetically descriptive (as in, for example, Welsh). For instance, the letter eth (Ð ð) has no phonemes attached to it. In this, Hammershaimb had accepted the advice of the Icelandic independence leader Jón Sigurðsson, who had seen the manuscript for his Bemerkninger med Hensyn til den Færøiske Udtale ("Notes with Respect to Faroese Pronunciation"); Hammershaimb considered that, despite its artificiality, this was the only approach that would overcome the problems of differing dialects in the islands. Hammershaimb's orthography met with some opposition for its complexity. In 1889, Jakob Jakobsen proposed modifying Hammershaimb's system to bring it closer to the spoken language, but a committee charged with considering the proposal in 1895 advocated only minor revisions, and the bulk of Hammershaimb's orthography remained in force. In 1886–1891, Hammershaimb published his principal work, Færøsk Anthologi; it incorporated an account of the islands and their inhabitants, a variety of prose and verse in the Faroese language, and a grammar, and – in the second volume – a lexicon by Jakobsen.

== Literature in Faroese ==
A new national written literature in Faroese became possible only after the language's orthography was normalized. Its development was promoted by nationalist agitation, which hastened the restoration of the Faroese Parliament in 1852 and the end of the Danish royal trade monopoly in 1856. During the late 19th century, modern Faroese literature began to appear and the first Faroese newspaper, Føringatíðindi, appeared in 1890. Faroese literature came into its own after the turn of the 20th century. After World War II, Faroese became the official language of the Faroe Islands.

== Works ==
- Færøiske Sagn and Bemerkninger med Hensyn til den Færøiske Udtale. Annaler for nordisk Oldkyndighed og Historie 1846, pp. 358–365.
- Færöiske Kvæder. 2 vols. Det Nordiske Literatur-Samsfund. Nordiske Oldskrifter 12, 20. Copenhagen: Berlings, 1851, 1855
- Færøisk Sproglære. Annaler for nordisk Oldkyndighed og Historie 1854
- Færøsk Anthologi. 2 vols. Volume 1 Tekst samt historisk og grammatisk Indledning. Volume 2 Ordsamling og Register, ed. Jakob Jakobsen. Samfund til Udgivelse af gammel nordisk Litteratur 15. Copenhagen: Møller, 1886, 1891.

== Other sources ==
- Lockwood, W. B. An introduction to modern Faroese. Copenhagen: Munksgaard, 1964
