= H. N. Jacobsens Bókahandil =

Oldest bookshop in the Faroe Islands

Coordinates: 62°00′37″N 6°46′20″W

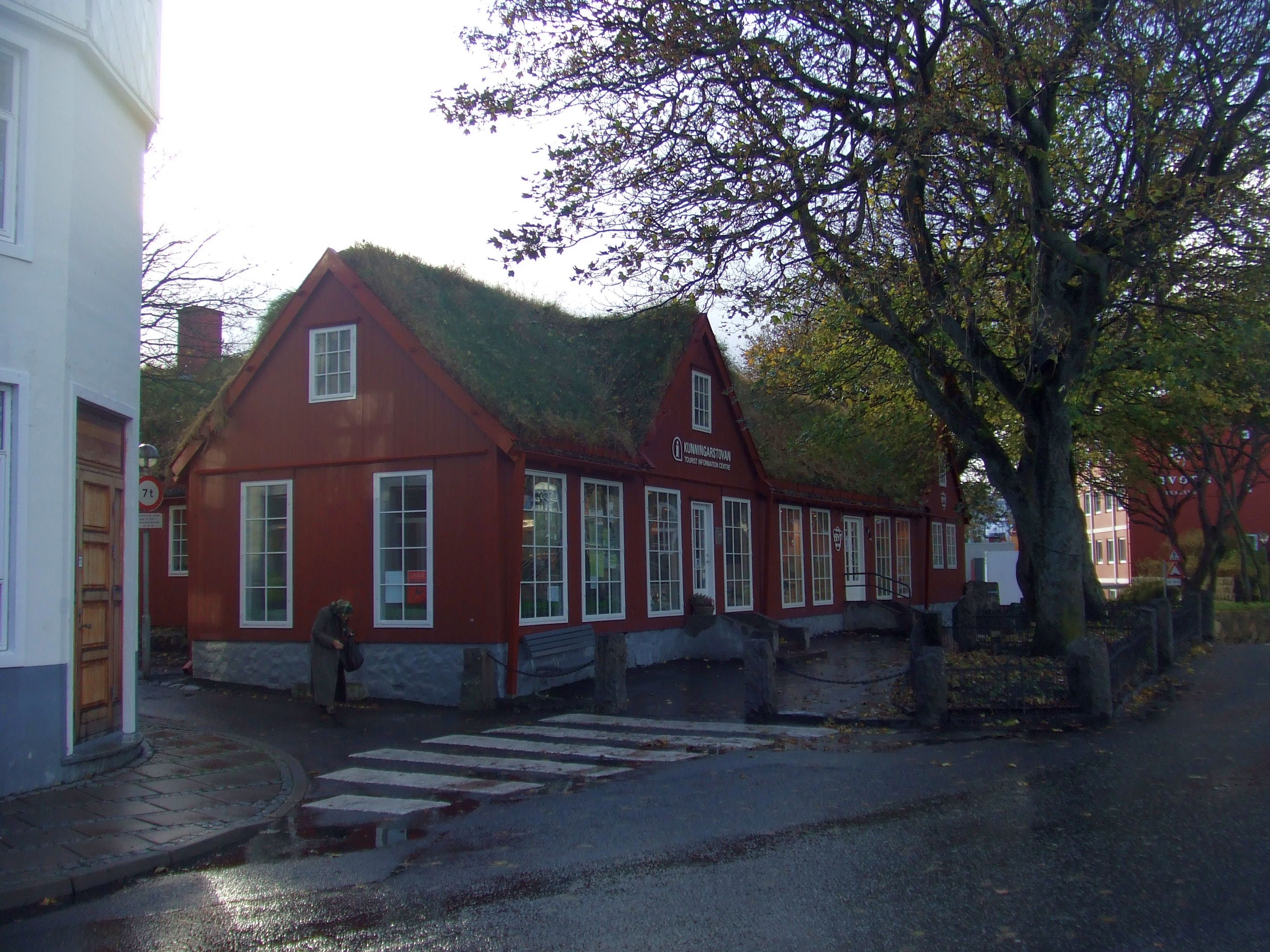
H.N. Jacobsens Bókahandil

H.N. Jacobsens Bókahandil is the oldest bookshop in the Faroe Islands. It is also one of the oldest shops still in business in the Faroes today.

The bookshop was established on St. Olafs day on 29 July 1865 by bookbinder Hans Nicolai Jacobsen. He was the father of Jakob Jakobsen (1864-1918), who is one of the most important Faroese philologists.

H. N. Jacobsen was one of the initiators of a public meeting in Tórshavn in 1888, aiming at public support for “the protection and preservation of the Faroese language and traditions”, as the notice announcing the meeting said. This is considered as the official start of the Faroese National Movement.

The original book shop was in the old main street "Gongin", but 1918 it was moved to the Market Square "Vaglið", at the start of Niels Finsens gøta, where it still stands today.

With its characteristic Faroese grass roof and big maple trees in the foreground, it is a landmark in Tórshavn. In addition, a section of H.N. Jacobsens Bókahandil operates an antiquarian bookshop.
