= Northern Sámi Braille =

Braille system for Northern Sami

- Script type: alphabet
- Print basis: Northern Sámi alphabet
- Languages: Northern Sámi

Related scripts
- Parent systems: Braille: French Braille; Scandinavian Braille; Northern Sámi Braille

Northern Sámi Braille is the braille alphabet of the Northern Sámi language. It was developed in the 1980s based on the Scandinavian Braille alphabet but with the addition of seven new letters (á, č, đ, ŋ, š, ŧ, ž) required for writing in Northern Sámi.

== Chart ==
Northern Sámi Braille uses ⠷ (French à) for á, dot 6 is added to c and d for ⠩ č and ⠹ đ, while the other accented letters are the mirror-images in braille of the base form in print.

a	á	b	c	č	d	đ	e	f	g
h	i	j	k	l	m	n	ŋ	o	p
r	s	š	t	ŧ	u	v	z	ž	⠀ (braille pattern blank)

Punctuation is the same as in Norwegian Braille.
