= Faroese Braille =

Braille system for Faroese

- Script type: alphabet
- Print basis: Faroese alphabet
- Languages: Faroese

Related scripts
- Parent systems: Braille: Faroese Braille

Faroese Braille is the braille alphabet of the Faroese language. It has the same basic letter assignments as Scandinavian Braille (itself based on International or French Braille), with additions from the Faroese and Danish alphabets.

== Alphabet ==
Faroese Braille bears many similarities to Icelandic Braille, and it is as easy for a Faroese-speaker to read Icelandic Braille as it is for a Faroese-speaker to read Icelandic printed text. They both contain letters not present in Scandinavian Braille; however, they differ in that Faroese Braille excludes the letters ⟨c⟩, ⟨é⟩, and ⟨þ⟩ and includes the letters ⟨å⟩, ⟨ei⟩, ⟨ey⟩, and ⟨oy⟩. (Certain diphthongs are considered single sounds in Faroese and cannot be broken down into individual letters.) Some letter assignments are different between Faroese and Icelandic Braille, such as ⟨ó⟩ and ⟨á⟩. Faroese Braille also contains several letters (namely, ⟨q⟩, ⟨x⟩, ⟨w⟩, and ⟨z⟩) that are present in the Danish alphabet but not the Faroese one.

a	á	b	d	ð	e	f	g	h
i	í	j	k	l	m	n	o	ó
p	q	r	s	t	u	ú	v	w
x	y	ý	z	æ	ø	å		
ei	ey	oy						

== Punctuation ==
,	'	;	:	.	!	?	-	/
... " ... "			... ( ... )			—		...

The apostrophe, ⠄, is also used as the mark of abbreviations, while ⠲ is used as a period / full stop.

== Formatting ==
(num.)	(caps)	(ital.)
