= Icelandic Braille =

Braille alphabet of the Icelandic language

- Script type: Alphabet
- Print basis: Icelandic alphabet
- Languages: Icelandic

Related scripts
- Parent systems: Braille: French Braille; Icelandic Braille

Icelandic Braille is the braille alphabet of the Icelandic language.

== Alphabet ==
The letter assignment is the same as in the Scandinavian Braille with the addition of certain Icelandic letters. There is even more overlap with the Faroese Braille. The base letters are the same as in French Braille. Note that c, q, w, and z are not used in Modern Icelandic, but are included so that foreign proper names can still be spelt.

a	á	b	c	d	ð	e	é	f	g
h	i	í	j	k	l	m	n	o	ó
p	q	r	s	t	u	ú	v	w	x
y	ý	z	þ	æ	ö	.	?	@	%

== Punctuation ==
.	,	’	;	:	.	!	?	”	*	/
-	—		... „ ... “		... ‚ ... ‘		... ( ... )		... [ ... ]	

UNESCO (2013) reports that ⠠ is both the mark of capitalization and the ellipsis. However, as they have wrong info about which letters mean which in the alphabet in regard to the Nordic countries, this information is not to be trusted.
