= Faroese Language Board =

Language regulator for the Faroese language

The Faroese Language Board (in Faroese: Málráðið, before 2012, Føroyska málnevndin) is the language regulator of the Faroese language. It was founded in April 1985, and it is located in Tórshavn. The board aims to strengthen and further develop the Faroese language and advise the Faroese government on language issues. The board has, among other things, the task of setting the writing style for new words that enter the language and to ensure that the public uses the language satisfactorily. The Language Board is subject to the Faroese Ministry of Culture.

The Council is a member of the Nordic Language Council, which is part of the Nordic Council.

== Tasks ==
According to the board's purpose clause (§2), these are the committee's set tasks:

- Collecting and storing new Faroese words and helping to choose and create new words. The board must also be observant to find linguistic errors that are committed and then try to prevent the errors from becoming widespread.
- To work with language boards in associations and institutions, and support them as much as possible in their work.
- Responding to issues related to language for institutions and private bodies, and collaborating with institutions and media that have a significant impact on language, such as government administration, schools, newspapers, radio and television.
- To answer questions about personal-names, place names and other names. Questions and answers will be stored in the board's archive.
- To cooperate with other linguistic councils / boards and similar institutions in other Nordic countries, and send representatives to their meetings.
