= Jakobson (surname) =

Family name

Origin
- Meaning: "son of Jakob"

Other names
- Variant forms: Jacobson, Jacobsen

Jakobson is a patronymic surname meaning "son of Jakob". Notable people with the surname include:

- August Jakobson (1904–1963), Estonian writer
- Barbara Jakobson (1933–2025), American art collector
- Carl Robert Jakobson (1841–1882), Estonian journalist, writer, politician and teacher
- Eduard Magnus Jakobson (1847–1903), Estonian wood engraver
- Gregg Jakobson (born 1939), American songwriter
- Idel Jakobson (1904–1997), Latvian NKVD investigator
- Lars Jakobson (born 1959), Swedish author
- Lars Jakobson Thingnæsset (1760–1829), Norwegian farmer and politician
- Leo Jakobson (born 1953), Estonian curler
- Maarja Jakobson (born 1977), Estonian actress
- Max Jakobson (1923–2013), Finnish diplomat
- Peeter Jakobson (1854–1899), Estonian writer
- Roman Jakobson (1896–1982), Russian linguist
- Maggie Wheeler (born 1961 as Margaret Jakobson), American actress

== See also ==
- Jacobson (surname)
- Jakobsen, given name and surname
