= Rune Angell-Jacobsen =

Norwegian novelist (born 1947)

Rune Angell-Jacobsen (born December 16, 1947 Florø) is a Norwegian novelist.

He is a former lieutenant colonel in the Air Force, where he worked as a systems operator on P-3 Orion, and later as an intelligence officer.

== Works ==
- SAS-fly kapret (SAS plane hijacked!)
- Døden er hvit (Death is white)
- Amerika! Series of 52
- Sara vakker Series of 22
- Abel Ek - En statsråds død (Abel Ek)
- Folket på Lindstad
