= Peeter Jakobson (writer) =

Estonian writer

- Born: 27 December 1854; Rakvere, Estonia
- Died: 23 July 1899 (aged 44); Väike-Maarja, Estonia
- Resting place: Väike-Maarja Cemetery
- Occupation: Writer
- Known for: post-romantic poetry, short stories, memoirs

Peeter Jakobson (27 December 1854 – 23 July 1899) was an Estonian writer. Jakobson wrote post-romantic poetry, short stories and memoirs. He also translated his poems into German.

He born in Rakvere. From 1877 to 1878, he participated on Russo-Turkish War.

He died in Väike-Maarja, and he is buried at Väike-Maarja Cemetery.

== Works ==
- poetry collection "Õilme nupukesed" (1881)
- poetry collection"Luuletused" I–II (1884–1885)
- theatre piece "Koit ja Hämarik" (1884)
- theatre piece"Udumäe kuningas ehk kroonitud voorus" (1888)
- memories "Minu sõjamälestused" (1901)
