= Faroese language =

North Germanic language of the Faroe Islands

Faroese
- føroyskt
- Pronunciation: [ˈføːɹɪst]
- Native to: Faroe Islands
- Ethnicity: Faroe Islanders
- Native speakers: 69,000 (2015)
- Language family: Indo-European: Germanic; North Germanic; West Scandinavian; Insular Scandinavian; Faroese
- Early forms: Old Norse: Old West Norse; Old Norwegian; Old Faroese
- Writing system: Latin (Faroese alphabet); Faroese Braille

Official status
- Official language in: Faroe Islands
- Recognised minority language in: Denmark
- Regulated by: Faroese Language Board Føroyska málnevndin

Language codes
- ISO 639-1: fo
- ISO 639-2: fao
- ISO 639-3: fao
- Glottolog: faro1244
- Linguasphere: 52-AAA-ab
- Faroese is classified as Vulnerable by the UNESCO Atlas of the World's Languages in Danger.

Faroese (Note: While the spelling Faeroese is also seen, Faroese is the spelling used in grammars, textbooks, scientific articles and dictionaries between Faroese and English.) (/ˌfɛəroʊˈiːz, ˌfær-/ FAIR-oh-EEZ, FARR-; endonym: føroyskt [ˈføːɹɪst]) is a North Germanic language spoken as a first language by about 69,000 Faroe Islanders, of whom 21,000 reside mainly in Denmark and elsewhere.

It is one of five languages descended from Old West Norse spoken in the Middle Ages; the others include Norwegian, Icelandic, and the extinct Norn and Greenlandic Norse. Faroese and Icelandic, its closest extant relative, are not easily mutually intelligible in speech, but the written languages resemble each other quite closely, largely owing to Faroese's etymological orthography.

== History ==
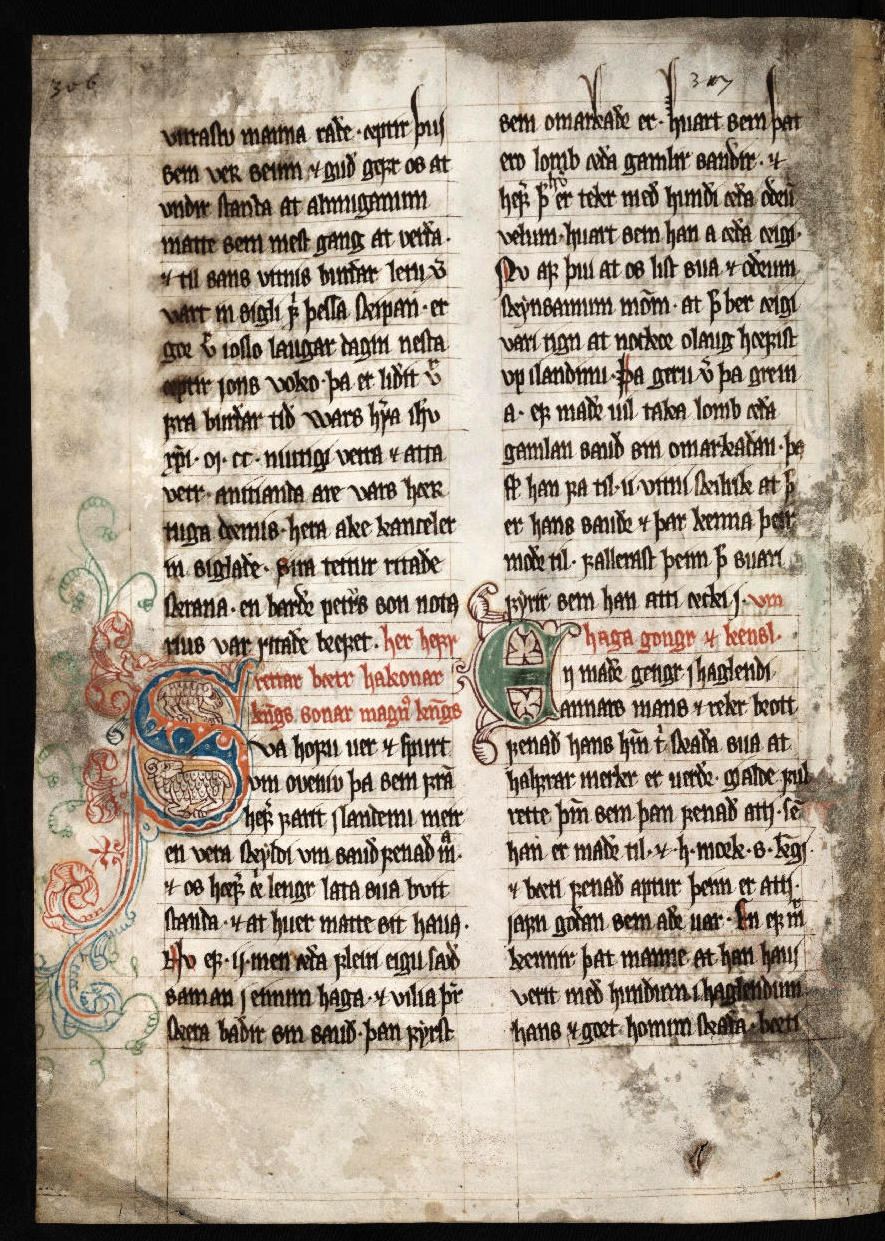
The Sheep letter (Seyðabrævið) is the oldest surviving document of the Faroes. Written in 1298 in Old Norse, it contains some words and expressions believed to be especially Faroese.

The approximate extent of Old Norse and related languages in the early 10th century: Old West Norse dialect Old East Norse dialect Old Gutnish dialect Old English Crimean Gothic Other Germanic languages with which Old Norse still retained some mutual intelligibility

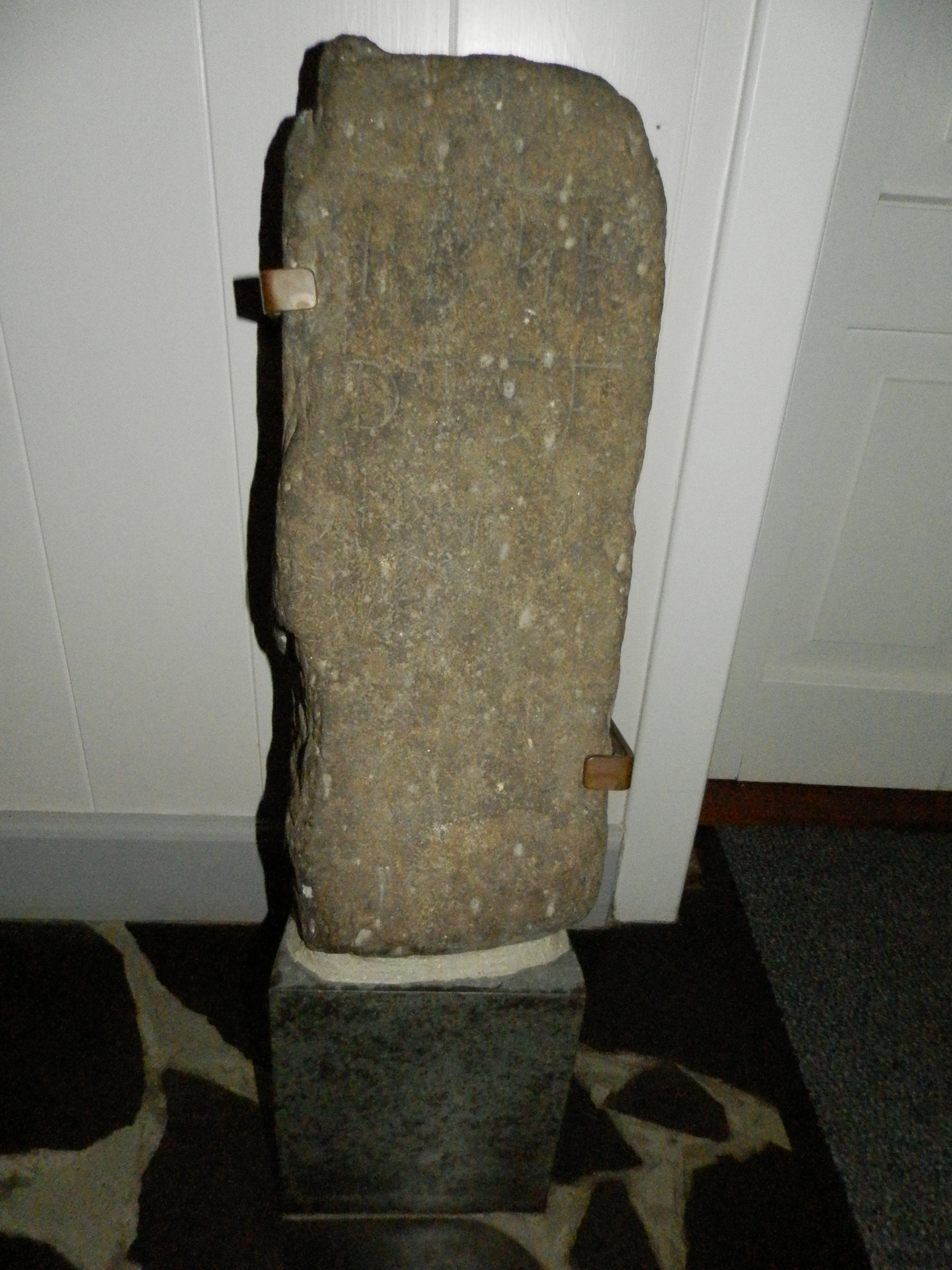
The Fámjin stone, a Faroese runestone

- Proto-Germanic
  - East Germanic languages
  - West Germanic languages
  - Proto-Norse →
    - Old Norse
      - Old West Norse
        - Icelandic
        - Faroese
        - Norwegian
      - Old East Norse
        - Danish
        - Swedish

Around 900, the language spoken in the Faroes was Old Norse, which Norse settlers had brought with them during the time of the settlement (landnám) of the Faroes that began in 825. However, many of the settlers were not from Scandinavia, but descendants of Norse settlers in the Irish Sea region. In addition, women from Norse-occupied Ireland, the Norse–Gaelic Isles, Orkney, and Shetland often married native Scandinavian men before settling in the Faroe Islands and Iceland. As a result, the Middle Irish language has had some influence on both Faroese and Icelandic.

There is speculation about Gaelic language place names in the Faroes: for example, the names of Mykines, Stóra Dímun, Lítla Dímun and Argir have been hypothesized to contain Celtic roots. Other examples of early-introduced words of Celtic origin are: blak/blaðak (buttermilk), cf. Middle Irish bláthach; drunnur (tail-piece of an animal), cf. Middle Irish dronn; grúkur (head, headhair), cf. Middle Irish gruaig; lámur (hand, paw), cf. Middle Irish lámh; tarvur (bull), cf. Middle Irish tarbh; and ærgi (pasture in the outfield), cf. Middle Irish áirge.

Between the 9th and the 15th centuries, a distinct Faroese language evolved, although it was probably still mutually intelligible with Old West Norse, and remained similar to the Norn language of Orkney and Shetland during Norn's earlier phase.

Faroese ceased to be a written language after the Danish–Norwegian Reformation of the early 16th century, with Danish replacing Faroese as the language of administration and education. The islanders continued to use the language in ballads, folktales, and everyday life. This maintained a rich spoken tradition, but for 300 years the language was not used in written form.

In 1823, the Danish Bible Society published a diglot of the Gospel of Matthew, with Faroese on the left and Danish on the right.

Venceslaus Ulricus Hammershaimb and the Icelandic grammarian and politician Jón Sigurðsson published a written standard for Modern Faroese in 1854, which still exists. They set a standard for the orthography of the language, based on its Old Norse roots and similar to that of Icelandic. The main purpose of this was for the spelling to represent the diverse dialects of Faroese in equal measure. Additionally, it had the advantages of being etymologically clear and keeping the kinship with the Icelandic written language. The actual pronunciation, however, often differs considerably from the written rendering. The letter ð, for example, has no specific phoneme attached to it.

Jakob Jakobsen devised a rival system of orthography, based on his wish for a phonetic spelling, but this system was never taken up by the speakers.

In 1908, Scripture Gift Mission published the Gospel of John in Faroese.

In 1937, Faroese replaced Danish as the official school language, in 1938, as the church language, and in 1948, as the national language by the Home Rule Act of the Faroe Islands. The first complete translation of the Bible was completed in 1948.

Up until the 1980s, public radio broadcasts were primarily conducted in Norwegian and Danish. This helps to explain why older generations can speak Norwegian in addition to Danish and Faroese. Faroese broadcasts quickly replaced earlier programs and now all radio content is transmitted in the language, alongside all local newspapers. Today, Danish is considered a foreign language, although around 5% of residents on the Faroes learn it as a first language. Both Danish and English are obligatory at the primary and secondary school levels, with fluency in English becoming increasingly valued particularly among the younger generations. Films and television are frequently shown in English with Danish subtitles.

In 2017, the tourist board Visit Faroe Islands launched a website entitled Faroe Islands Translate. Text can be entered in thirteen languages, including English, Chinese, Russian, Japanese, French, Spanish, and Portuguese. Instead of an instant machine translation being given, the text goes to a volunteer who will provide a live video translation, or else a recorded one later. The aim of this project was to get Faroese featured on Google Translate.

== Old Faroese ==
Old Faroese (miðaldarføroyskt, ca. mid-14th to mid-16th centuries) is a form of Old Norse spoken in medieval times in the Faroe Islands. The most crucial aspects of the development of Faroese are diphthongisation and palatalisation.

There is not enough data available to establish an accurate chronology of Faroese, but a rough one may be developed through comparison to the chronologies of Old Icelandic and Old Norwegian. In the 12th/13th centuries, á and ǫ́ merged as /ɔː/; later on at the beginning of the 14th century, delabialization took place: y, øy, au > /i, ɔi, ɛi/; í and ý merged in addition to i and y, but in the case of í and ý, it appears that labialisation took place instead as is documented by later development to /ʊi/. Further, the language underwent a palatalisation of k, g and sk before Old Norse e, i, y, ø, au > /kʲ, ɡʲ, skʲ/ > /cᶜ̧, ɟᶨ, ɕcᶜ̧/ > /tʃʰ, tʃ, ʃ/. Before the palatalisation é and ǽ merged as /ɛː/ and approximately in the same period epenthetic u is inserted into word-final /Cr/ and /CrC/ clusters.

A massive quantity shift also operated in Middle Faroese. In the case of skerping, it took place after delabialization but before loss of post-vocalic ð and g /ɣ/. The shift of hv /hw/ to /kw/, the deletion of /h/ in (remaining) word-initial /h/–sonorant clusters (hr, hl, hn > r, l, n), and the dissolution of þ (þ > t; þ > h in demonstrative pronouns and adverbs) appeared before the end of the 13th century. Another undated change is the merger of ǫ, ø and ǿ into /ø/; pre-nasal ǫ, ǫ́ > o, ó. enk, eng probably became eing, eink in the 14th century; the development of a to /ɛ/ before ng, nk appeared after the palatalisation of k, g, and sk had been completed, such a change is quite a recent development, as well as change Cve > Cvø.

Development of vowels from Old Norse to Modern Faroese
9th century (Old Norse)	up to 14th century (Early Faroese)	14th–16th centuries (Old Faroese)		17th century (Late Old Faroese)				20th century (New Faroese)				Modern orthography
9th century (Old Norse)	up to 14th century (Early Faroese)	North	South	North		South		North		South		Modern orthography
9th century (Old Norse)	up to 14th century (Early Faroese)	North	South	long	short	long	short	long	short	long	short	Modern orthography
i and y	/i/	/iː/		/iː/	/ɪ/	/iː/	/ɪ/	[iː]	[ɪ]	[iː]	[ɪ]	i, y
e and æ	/e/	/eː/		/eː/	/ɛ/	/e/	/ɛ/	[eː]	[ɛ]	[eː]	[ɛ]	e
ø	/ø/	/øː/	/ø/	/øː/	/œ/	/øː/	/œ/	[øː]	[œ]	[øː]	[ʏ]	ø
ǫ	/ɔ͔/	/ɔ͔ː/		/øː/	/œ/	/øː/	/œ/	[øː]	[œ]	[øː]	[ʏ]	ø
u	/u/	/uː/		/uː/	/ʊ/	/uː/	/ʊ/	[uː]	[ʊ]	[uː]	[ʊ]	u
o	/o/	/oː/	/o/	/oː/	/ɔ/	/oː/	/ɔ/	[oː]	[ɔ]	[oː]	[ɔ]	o
a	/a/	/ɛː/		/ɛː/	/æ/	/ɛː/	/æ/	[ɛa]	[a]	[ɛa]	[a]	a
Long vowel → Diphthong
í and ý	/yː/	/ʊi/		/ʊi/	/ʊi/	/ʊi/	/ʊi/	[ui]	[ʊi]	[ui]	[ʊi]	í, ý
é and ǽ	/ɛː/	/ɛː/	/eː/	/ɛəː/	/ɛə/	/eː/	/ɛ/	[ɛa]	[a]	[eː]	[ɛ]	æ
ǿ	/œː/	/œː/		/øː/	/œ/	/øː/	/œ/	[øː]	[œ]	[øː]	[ʏ]	ø
ú	/uː/	/ʉu/		/ʉu/	/ʉʏ/	/ʉu/	/ʉʏ/	[ʉu]	[ʏ]	[ʉu]	[ʏ]	ú
ó	/oː/	/ɜu/	/ɔu/	/ɜu/	/ɜ/	/ɔu/	/ɔ/	[œu, ɛu]	[œ]	[ɔu]	[ɔ]	ó
á and ǫ́	/ɔː/	/ɔː/		/ɔː/	/ɔ/	/ɔː/	/ɔ/	[ɔa]	[ɔ]	[ɔa]	[ɔ]	á
True diphthongs
au	/ɶu/	/ɛi/						[ɛi]	[ɛ]	[ɛi]	[ɛ]	ey
øy	/œy/	/ɔi/						[ɔi]	[ɔ]	[ɔi]	[ɔ]	oy
ei	/æi/	/ai/						[ɔi]	[ɔ]	[ai]	[ai]	ei

== Dialects ==
Major dialects and subdialects of Faroese as described by Petersen: Northwest Dialect Northern Dialect Central Dialect Southern Dialect

Faroese is a highly variable language with many dialects actively used across the islands’ approximately 120 communities. While the dialect of Tórshavn is the most prominent due to the city's outstanding size, there is no official spoken standard variety and little evidence that the Tórshavn dialect has developed prestige status. Faroese speech communities are tightly knit and the use of dialectal speech is widely encouraged.

The study of Faroese dialectology began hundreds of years ago, with the scholar Lucas Debes noting a north–south distinction as early as 1673. In the 18th century linguist Jens Christian Svabo made further distinctions, such as identifying the Tórshavn dialect, though his categorization lacked thorough justification. In 1891 Venceslaus Ulricus Hammershaimb would write a more definitive study of the language's variation, noting distinguishing characteristics of the north–south divide such as the northern aspiration of unvoiced plosives after long vowels and the pronunciation of ⟨ó⟩ as /œ/ in most of the north compared to /ɔ/ in the south.

The most recent and detailed classification by Hjalmar P. Petersen divides the language into four major varieties including North-Western Faroese, Central Faroese, Northern Faroese, and Southern Faroese. Additional sub-dialects of particular islands and villages have also been identified. Most of the analysis by Petersen and earlier authors is based on phonological evidence.

The southern variety of Faroese is very distinct, possibly due to geographic distance exacerbated by the lack of underwater tunnels which have connected most other islands north of Sandur. The dialect of these islands is characterized by a unique form of certain personal pronouns, alongside phonological features such as the intervocalic voicing of non-geminate stops. The fortis consonants /p/, /t/, and /k/ are weakened.

The central dialect area centered around Suðurstreymoy features a merging of ⟨i⟩ and ⟨u⟩ in unstressed ending syllables. The fortis consonants are neither aspirated nor weakened. The island of Nólsoy is a notable transitional area due to its unique realization of long ⟨ó⟩ as [au:] and short ⟨ó⟩ as [ɔ] compared to the [ɔu:] and [œ] found in Tórshavn and elsewhere.

The northern dialect is characterized by preaspirated fortis consonants /p/, /t/, and /k/ following certain long vowels and a monophthongal pronunciation of ⟨á⟩ in ending syllables, i.e., /aː/. The realization of ⟨ei⟩ as [ɔi:] dominates in this region, although small parts of the central and northwestern regions use this pronunciation as well.

The northwestern dialect features aspirated fortis consonants after long vowels. The ⟨i⟩ and ⟨u⟩ vowels remain unmerged in unstressed ending syllables. Long ⟨ó⟩ is pronounced [ɔu] and short ⟨ó⟩ is pronounced [œ].

== Alphabet ==
The Faroese alphabet consists of 29 letters derived from the Latin script:

Majuscule forms (also called uppercase or capital letters)
A	Á	B	D	Ð	E	F	G	H	I	Í	J	K	L	M	N	O	Ó	P	R	S	T	U	Ú	V	Y	Ý	Æ	Ø
Minuscule forms (also called lowercase or small letters)
a	á	b	d	ð	e	f	g	h	i	í	j	k	l	m	n	o	ó	p	r	s	t	u	ú	v	y	ý	æ	ø

== Phonology ==
=== Vowels ===
Faroese monophthongs
	Front				Central		Back	
	unrounded		rounded		Central		Back	
	short	long	short	long	short	long	short	long
Close	ɪ	iː	ʏ	(yː)			ʊ	uː
Mid	ɛ	eː	œ	øː			ɔ	oː
Open					a	(aː)		

As with most other Germanic languages, Faroese has a large number of vowels, with 26 in total. Vowel distribution is similar to other North Germanic languages in that short vowels appear in closed syllables (those ending in consonant clusters or long consonants) and long vowels appear in open syllables.

Faroese vowel alternations
Monophthongs
Long vowel				Short vowel		
/i/	linur	[ˈliːnʊɹ]	'soft'	lint	[lɪn̥t]	'soft (N.)'
/e/	frekur	[ˈfɹeː(ʰ)kʊɹ]	'greedy'	frekt	[fɹɛʰkt]	'greedy (N.)'
/y/	mytisk	[ˈmyːtɪsk]	'mythological'	mystisk	[ˈmʏstɪsk]	'mysterious'
/ø/	høgur	[ˈhøːʋʊɹ~ˈhøœʋʊɹ]	'high (M.)'	høgt	[hœkt]	'high (N.)'
/u/	gulur	[ˈkuːlʊɹ]	'yellow'	gult	[kʊl̥t]	'yellow (N.)'
/o/	tola	[ˈtʰoːla]	'to endure'	toldi	[ˈtʰɔltɪ]	'endured'
/a/	Kanada	[ˈkʰaːnata]	'Canada'	land	[lant]	'land'
Diphthongs
Long vowel				Short vowel		
/ʊi/	hvítur	[ˈkvʊiːtʊɹ]	'white (M.)'	hvítt	[kvʊiʰtː]	'white (N.)'
/ɛi/	deyður	[ˈteiːjʊɹ]	'dead (M.)'	deytt	[tɛʰtː]	'dead (N.)'
/ai/	feitur	[ˈfaiːtʊɹ]	'fat (M.)'	feitt	[faiʰtː~fɔiʰtː]	'fat (N.)'
/ɔi/	gloyma	[ˈklɔiːma]	'to forget'	gloymdi	[ˈklɔimtɪ]	'forgot'
/ɛa/	spakur	[ˈspɛaː(ʰ)kʊɹ]	'calm (M.)'	spakt	[spakt]	'calm (N.)'
/ɔa/	vátur	[ˈvɔaːtʊɹ]	'wet (M.)'	vátt	[vɔʰtː]	'wet (N.)'
/ʉu/	fúlur	[ˈfʉuːlʊɹ]	'foul (M.)'	fúlt	[fʏl̥t]	'foul (N.)'
/ɔu/	tómur	[ˈtʰɔuːmʊɹ~ˈtʰœuːmʊɹ]	'empty (M.)'	tómt	[tʰœm̥t~tʰɔm̥t]	'empty (N.)'

Faroese shares with Icelandic and Danish the feature of maintaining a contrast between stops based exclusively on aspiration, not voicing. Geminated stops may be pre-aspirated in intervocalic and word-final position. Intervocalically the aspirated consonants become pre-aspirated unless followed by a closed vowel. In clusters, the preaspiration merges with a preceding nasal or apical approximant, rendering them voiceless.

=== Consonants ===
		Labial	Coronal			Dorsal	Glottal
		Labial	Dental / Alveolar	Retro- flex	Palatal	Velar	Glottal
Plosive / Affricate	Fortis	pʰ	tʰ	(ʈʰ)	tʃʰ	kʰ	(ʔ)
Plosive / Affricate	Lenis	p	t	(ʈ)	tʃ	k	(ʔ)
Continuant	Fortis	f	s	(ʂ)	ʃ		h
Continuant	Lenis	v		ɹ (ɻ̊)	j	(w)	h
Sonorant
Sonorant	Nasal	m (m̥)	n (n̥)	(ɳ)	ɲ (ɲ̊)	ŋ (ŋ̊)	
Sonorant	Lateral		l (ɬ)	(ɭ)	(ʎ ʎ̥)		

(Non-phonemic phones are between parentheses)

There are several phonological processes involved in Faroese, including:

- Nasals generally assume the place of articulation and laryngeal settings of following consonants.
- Velar stops palatalize to postalveolar affricates before /j/ /eː/ /ɛ/ /iː/ /ɪ/ and /ɛi/
- /v/ becomes [f] before voiceless consonants
- /sk/ becomes [ʃ] after /ɛi, ai, ɔi/ and before /j/
- /ɹ/ becomes retroflex before consonants in consonant clusters, yielding the allophones [ʂ ɭ ʈ ɳ] while /ɹ/ itself becomes [ɻ], example: /rt/ is realized as [ɻ̊ʈ].
- Pre-occlusion of original /ll/ to [tl] and /nn/ to [tn].
- Pre-aspiration of original voiceless stops [ʰp ʰt ʰk ʰtʃ] after non-high long vowels and diphthongs /ɛaː/ /ɔaː/ /eː/ /oː/ /øː/ or when a voiceless stop is followed by /n, l, r/. All long voiceless stops are pre-aspirated when doubled or in clusters [ʰpː ʰtː ʰkː ʰtʃː].

== Grammar ==
Faroese grammar is related and very similar to that of modern Icelandic and Old Norse. Faroese is an inflected language with three grammatical genders and four cases: nominative, accusative, dative and genitive.

Faroese Words and Phrases in comparison to other Germanic languages
Faroese	Icelandic	Norwegian (nynorsk)	Norwegian (bokmål)	Danish	Gutnish	Swedish	German	Dutch	West Frisian	English
Vælkomin	Velkomin	Velkomen	Velkommen	Velkommen	Velkummen	Välkommen	Willkommen	Welkom	Wolkom	Welcome
Farvæl	Far vel; Farðu heill	Farvel, Far vel	Farvel	Farvel	Farvæl	Farväl	Lebwohl	Vaarwel	Farwol	Farewell
Hvussu eitur tú?	Hvað heitir þú?	Kva (kvat) heiter du?	Hva heter du?	Hvad hedder du?	Kvar heitar däu?	Vad heter du?	Wie heißt du?	Hoe heet je?	Hoe hjitsto?	What is your name?
Hvussu gongur?	Hvernig gengur?	Korleis gjeng / går det?	Hvordan går det?	Hvordan går det?	Keu gadd e?	Hur går det?	Wie geht's?	Hoe gaat het?	Hoe giet it?	How is it going? (How goes it?)
Hvussu gamal (m) / gomul (f) ert tú?	Hversu gamall (m) / gömul (f) ert þú?	Kor gamal er du?	Hvor gammel er du?	Hvor gammel er du?	Keu gammal jär däu?	Hur gammal är du?	Wie alt bist du?	Hoe oud ben je?	Hoe âld bisto?	How old are you?
Reyður / reyð / reytt	Rauður / rauð / rautt	Raud(t)	Rød(t)	Rød(t)	Ryt(t)	Rött / Röd	Rot	Rood / Rode	Read(e)	Red
Bláur / blá / blátt	Blár / blá / blátt	Blå(tt)	Blå(tt)	Blå(t)	Blå(t)	Blå(tt)	Blau	Blauw(e)	Blau(e)	Blue
Hvítur / hvít / hvítt	Hvítur / hvít / hvítt	Kvit(t)	Hvit(t)	Hvid(t)	Vit(t)	Vit(t)	Weiß	Wit(te)	Wyt / wite	White

== Example text ==
=== Universal Declaration of Human Rights ===
The following is a sample text of Article 1 of the Universal Declaration of Human Rights. The first line is the orthographic version; the second is the International Phonetic Alphabet transcription; the third is the gloss. A recording is available on the UDHR audio project's website.

{Grein 1:} Øll menniskju eru fødd fræls og jøvn til virðingar og mannarættindi. Tey hava skil og samvitsku og eiga {at fara} hvørt um annað í bróðuranda.
{ˈfɪsːt-a ˈkɹaiːn-∅ ||} ˈʔœtˑl ˈmɛnːɪʃ-ʊ (Note: Sandhi phenomena (nasal assimilation, h- and final vowel deletion) are sensitive to phrase boundaries.) (ʔ)ɛɹ-ʊ ˌfœtˑ-∅ {ˈfɹalːs-∅ (|)} ʔɔ {ˈjœuːn |} tʰɪl {ˈviːɹ.ɪŋk-aɹ (|)} ʔɔ {ˈman(ː)a.ˌɹaʰtːɪnt-ɪ ||} tʰɛi ‿(h)av-a {ˈʃiːl (|)} ʔɔ {ˌsaɱː‿.vɪsk-ˈʊˑ |} ʔɔ ˈʔaiː-(a)‿ {a(t) faɹ-a (|)} ˈkʰvœɻ̊ː-ʈ ʊm ˌanːa-∅ (ʔ)ʊi ˈpɹɔuːvʊɹ.ˌanːt-a
{First-FE.N.SG article-N.SG.IDF :} All\NT.N.PL human-N.PL.IDF be\IND.PRS-3PL born-NT.N.PL free-NT.N.PL and equal\NT.N.PL {in terms of} respec.t-G.IDF and {human.rights-A.IDF (Note: Faroese's genitive case is on its way to obsolenscence (cf. German undergoing a similar process). Outside some fixed combination, preposition mostly govern the accusative instead. Possession marking is then assured by possessive pronouns or the couple hjá 'with' / á 'on' (and marginally by at 'to', as in faðir at barninum '[the] father of the child'). E.g, hondin á mær 'my hand [lit: the hand on me]', súkklan hjá mær 'my bike [lit: the bike with me]' ; existing beside mín hond, mín súkkla. However there is no *søtin hjá mær '[lit: the sweetness with me]', *mamman hjá mær '[lit: the mom with me]' corresponding to søti mín 'my dear', mamma mín 'my mom'.) .} They\N have-IND.PRS.3PL reason-A.IDF and con.science-A.IDF and ought-IND.PRS.3PL {to behave-INF} each-A.SG around (an)other-MA.A.SG in {brother.hood-A.SG.IDF .}
1^{st} article: All humans are born free and equal in terms of respect and rights. They [all] have conscience and reason and ought to behave brotherly each around another.

=== Lord's Prayer ===
The following is a sample text of the Lord's Prayer in Faroese. The first line is the orthographic version; the second is the International Phonetic Alphabet transcription; the third is the gloss. A recording posted under the @teknmal767 channel is available on YouTube, it contains two performances of the prayer spoken and signed.

Faðir vár, Tú, sum ert í Himli. Heilagt verði navn Títt. Komi ríki Títt. Verði vilji Tín, sum í Himli, so á jørð. Gev okkum {í dag} okkara dagliga breyð. Og fyrigev okkum syndir okkara, {so sum} vit eisini fyrigeva teimum, ið móti okkum synda. [Og] Leið okkum ikki í freistingar, men frels okkum frá {tí illa}. Tí at [T]ítt er ríkið, valdið og heiðurin um allar ævir. Amen.
ˈfɛaː-jɪɹ {ˈvɔaːɹ-∅ |} ˈtʰʉuː sʊm ˌ(ʔ)ɛɻ̊ː-ʈ ʊi {ˈhɪmːl-ɪ ||} {ˈhaiːlaʰ-t (|)} (ˈ)ve(ː)ɹ-ɪ ˌnauːn-∅ {ˈtʰʊi-ʰtː |} ˈkʰoːm-ɪ ˌɹʊiːt͡ʃ-ɪ {ˈtʰʊi-ʰtː ||} ˈveːɹ-ɪ ˌvɪlːj-ɪ {ˈtʰʊiːn-∅ |} sʊm ʊi {ˈhɪmːl-ɪ (|)} so ʔɔa {ˈjøːɹ-∅ ||} ˈt͡ʃeːv-∅ ɔʰkˑ-ʊn ʊiˈtɛaː ɔʰkˑ-aɹa ˌtak.lij-a {ˈpɹɛiː-∅ ||} ʔɔ ˈfiˑɹɪ.ˌt͡ʃeːv-∅ ɔʰkˑ-ʊn ˈsɪnːt-ɪɹ {ɔʰkˑ-aɹa ||} {soˑ sʊɱ‿} ˈviˑt-∅ ˈʔaiːsɪnɪ ˈfiˑɹɪ.ˌt͡ʃɛv-a {ˈtʰaiː-mʊn |} ʔʊi ˈmɛuːtɪ ɔʰkˑ-ʊn {ˈsɪnːt-a ||} ʔɔ ˈlaiː-∅ ɔʰkˑ-ʊn ɪʰt͡ʃˑ‿ ʊi {ˈfɹaiʃːt.ɪŋk-aɹ |} mɛn ˈfɹɛɬːs-∅ ɔʰkˑ-ʊn ˌfɹɔaː {tʰʊiˈʔɪtˑla ||} tʰʊi at ˈtʰʊi-ʰtː ɛ‿-∅ {ˈɹʊiːt͡ʃ-ɪ |} {ˈvalːt-ɪ (|)} ʔɔ {ˈhaiː-(ʊ)ɹɪn |} ʔʊm ˈʔatˑl-aɹ {ˈʔɛaːv-ɪɹ ||} ˈʔamːˌɛn
Father-N.SG.IDF our-N.SG you\N.SG REL be\PRS.IND-2PS in {Heaven-D.SG.IDF .} Holy-NT.N become-SUB.PRS.3PS name-N.IDF {Your-NT.N.SG .} Come-SUB.PRS.3PS reign-N.IDF {Your-NT.N.SG .} Be-SUB.PRS.3PS will-N.IDF {Your-MA.N.SG ,} as:CONJ in Heaven-D.SG.IDF as:ADV on {earth-D.SG.IDF .} Give-IMP.2PS us-D.PL today our daily-FE.A.SG {bread-A.SG.IDF .} And forgive-IMP.2PS us-D.PL sin-A.PL.IDF {our ,} {just as} we-N also forgive-IND.PRS.3PS those-D.PL REL against us-D.PL {sin-INF .} And lead-IMP.2PS us-D.PL not into {temptation-A.SG.IDF ,} but deliver-IMP.2PS us-D.PL from {evil [lit: it\D.SG badly] .} For:CONJ to you-NT.A.SG be\PRS.IND-3PS {realm-N.SG.DF ,} power-N.SG.DF and glory-N.SG.DF through all-A.PL {lifetime-A.PL.IDF .} {Amen .}
Our Father, You, who stand in Heaven. Hallowed be Your name, may Your kingdom come, may Your will be done, on earth as [is] in Heaven. Give us today our daily bread. And forgive us our offenses, just as we also forgive those who offended us. And do not lead us into temptation, but deliver us from evil. For Yours is the realm, the power and the glory forever. Amen.

== See also ==
- Faroese language conflict
- Goidelic languages
- Gøtudanskt accent
- Old Norwegian
