= Jasna Jakobsen =

Norwegian wind engineer

Jasna Bogunović Jakobsen is a Norwegian wind engineer who studies the structural loads and aeroelastic flutter caused by wind on bridges and bridge cables. She is a professor in the Department of Machinery, Building and Materials Technology at the University of Stavanger.

== Education and career ==
Jakobsen earned a PhD at the Norwegian Institute of Technology in 1994, and joined the University of Stavanger faculty as an associate professor of civil engineering in 1995. She became a full professor in 2003.

== Contributions ==
Jakobsen has used a combination of anemometers and accelerometers to study the effects of wind on the Lysefjord Bridge in Norway. Her research on using lidar to measure wind speeds has been used to ensure the safety of a bridge across the Bjørnafjorden, designed to be the world's longest floating bridge.

== Recognition ==
Jakobsen is a member of the Norwegian Academy of Technological Sciences.
