= Nicolas Jacobsen =

American computer criminal

Nicholas Jacobsen is a hacker who had illegal access to the private information of T-Mobile customers for at least a year. He used an SQL injection attack to make T-Mobile's website dump its customer database. He was arrested after an investigation by the United States Secret Service in October 2004 and pleaded guilty at trial as part of a plea agreement.

Jacobsen's targets reportedly included Paris Hilton's T-Mobile Sidekick II, in addition to exposing documents emailed to an agent by the Secret Service.
