= Leonard Jacobson =

American architect

Leonard Jacobson FAIA (March 7, 1921 – December 26, 1992) was an American museum architect. He worked with I. M. Pei on some of the major museum projects in the 20th century.

== Biography ==
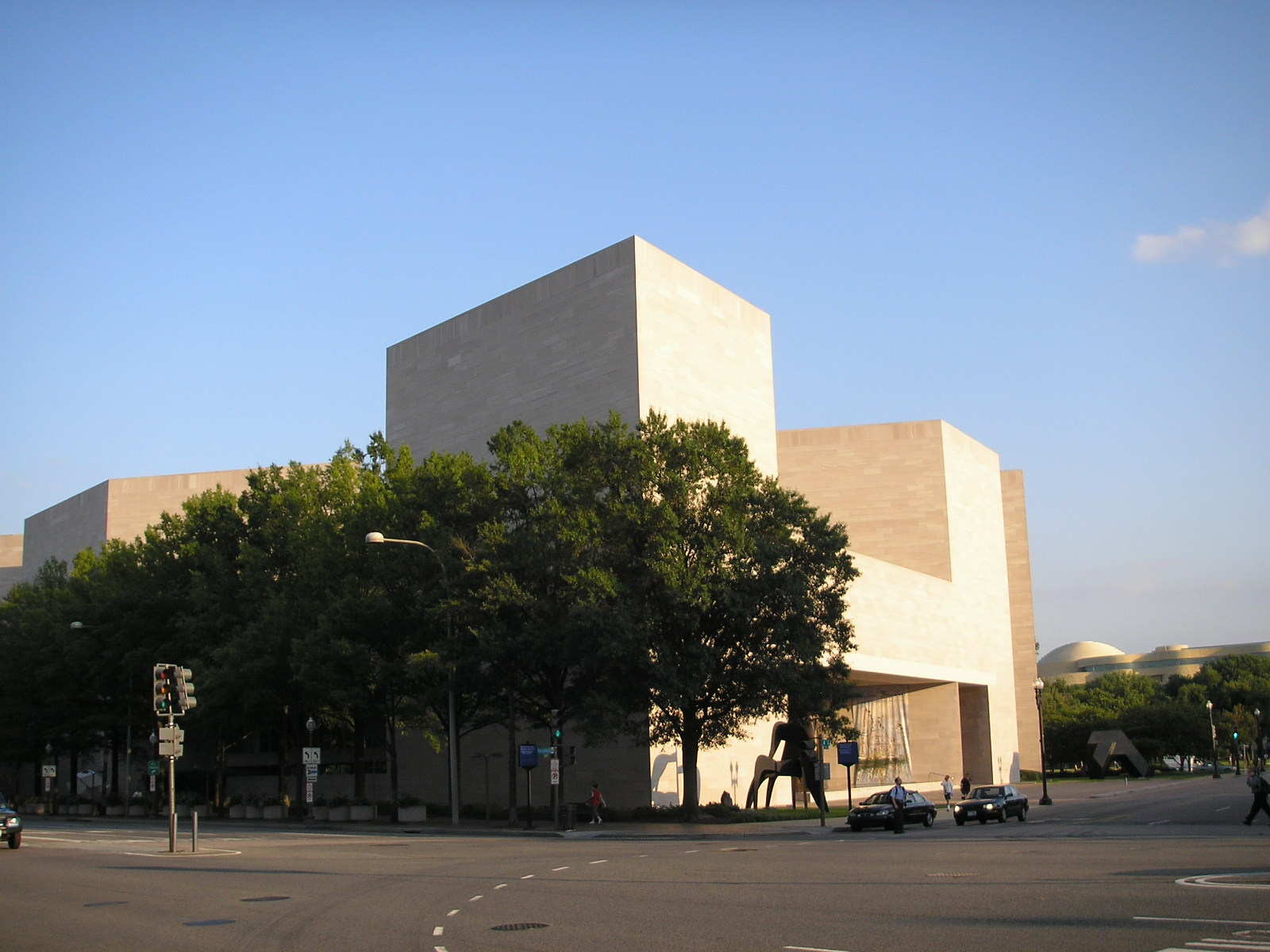
The East Building of the National Gallery of Art, Washington, D.C. (1978), one of the museum architecture projects with which Leonard Jacobson was involved.

Jacobson was born in Philadelphia, Pennsylvania, United States on March 7, 1921. He graduated from the University of Pennsylvania in 1942. He served in the United States Army Air Forces from 1942–45 during World War II. In 1947, he gained a Master of Architecture degree, also at the University of Pennsylvania.

In 1953, Jacobson started working with I.M. Pei, joining him at I. M. Pei & Partners, founded in 1955. He was a Partner in I. M. Pei & Partners (which became Pei Cobb Freed & Partners in 1989) from 1980–92. Jacobson was central to the following building projects in the US, mainly involving museums:

- East Building of the National Gallery of Art, Washington, D.C. (1978)
- West Wing of the Museum of Fine Arts, Boston, Massachusetts (1981)
- Portland Museum of Art, Portland, Maine (1982)
- Wiesner building, Massachusetts Institute of Technology, Cambridge, Massachusetts (1985)

At the end of his career in the 1980s and early 1990s, Jacobson was heavily involved with the modernization of the Louvre in Paris, France. Jacobson was a Fellow of the American Institute of Architects. In 1989, he was made an Officier of the Ordre des Arts et des Lettres by the French government.

Leonard Jacobson died of a heart attack on December 26, 1992 at the age of 71 at his home in the village of Briarcliff Manor, New York, USA.
