= Fritz Jakobsson =

Fritz Jakobsson (born 8 January 1940 in Pori) is a painter living in Vaasa, Finland most known for his portraits. He started his career in 1967 and has since then had about 110 art exhibitions in Finland, Sweden, Germany and Italy. He has done over 2000 works of art, of which about 800 are portraits. His most known commissioned portraits are of Queen Silvia of Sweden, Pope John Paul II, Cardinal Carlo Furno, Cardinal Giuseppe Caprio and Princess Stefania Angelo-Comneno of Thessaly. He has also painted many of the most influential people within Finnish public life and Finnish industry and trade, like Jaakko Pöyry, Kari Kairamo and Casimir Ehrnrooth just to mention a few. Fritz Jakobsson is a member of Angelica-Constantiniana Academy of Arts and Sciences.
