= Tariq Jakobsen =

Tariq Jakobsen (born October 2, 1974) is a Danish graphic design artist and illustrator. He studied graphic design at Copenhagen Technical College in Copenhagen from 2003 to 2007 and font design at Danmarks Mediehøjskole) in Copenhagen in 2008.

His works have been exhibited at Gallery Freie Liebe in Copenhagen 2007 among several places.

His illustrations have been published in several magazines, including Globalt Talt, which is published by the Danish Ministry for Foreign Affairs.
