= John G. Jacobson =

American politician and businessman

John G. Jacobson (January 25, 1869 – May 23, 1929) was an American politician and businessman.

Jacobson was born in Norway. He emigrated with his parents to the United States and settled in Chicago, Illinois in 1873. Jacobson was involved in the insurance business in Chicago. He was also involved in the Democratic Party. Jacobson served in the Illinois House of Representatives from 1915 to 1919 and from 1923 until his death in 1929. He died from heart disease while he was in the bathtub at his suite at the La Salle Hotel in Chicago, Illinois.
