= Stein Jacobsen =

Norwegian-American geochemist

Stein Bjornar Jacobsen (born 1950) is a Norwegian-American geochemist who works within cosmochemistry.

Hailing from Drammen, he finished a cand.mag. degree at the University of Oslo before studying geology in California with a Rotary grant. Jacobsen became a professor of geochemistry at Harvard University.

He was an inducted into the Norwegian Academy of Science and Letters in 1994. In 2009 he was inducted into the American Academy of Arts and Sciences, mainly for using "the distribution of long-lived and extinct radioisotopes to date the formation of the earth's core and to define the effects of core separation on the early history of the core-mantle-crust system".
