= Faroese orthography =

Conventions for writing the Faroese language

Faroese orthography is the method employed to write the Faroese language, using a 29-letter Latin alphabet. Although it does not include the letters C, Q, W, X and Z, Faroese keyboards include these letters.

== Alphabet ==
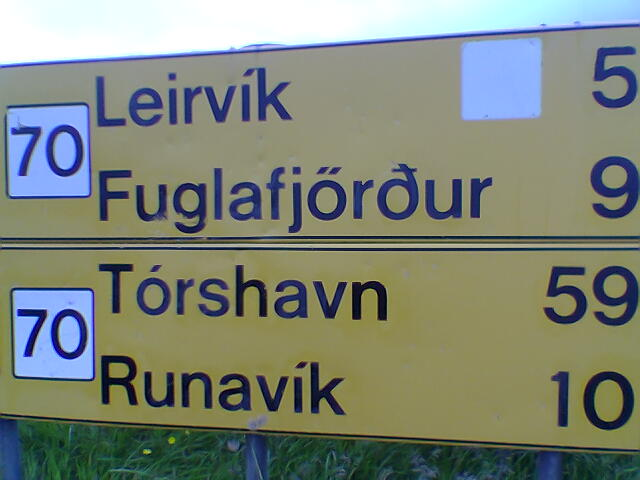
An example of Faroese ő. The usual orthography would be Fuglafjørður.

The Faroese alphabet consists of 29 letters derived from the Latin script:

Majuscule forms (also called uppercase or capital letters)
A	Á	B	D	Ð	E	F	G	H	I	Í	J	K	L	M	N	O	Ó	P	R	S	T	U	Ú	V	Y	Ý	Æ	Ø
Minuscule forms (also called lowercase or small letters)
a	á	b	d	ð	e	f	g	h	i	í	j	k	l	m	n	o	ó	p	r	s	t	u	ú	v	y	ý	æ	ø

Names of letters
Letter	Name	IPA
Aa	fyrra a ("leading a")	[ˈfɪɹːa ɛaː]
Áá	á	[ɔaː]
Bb	be	[peː]
Dd	de	[teː]
Ðð	edd	[ɛtː]
Ee	e	[eː]
Ff	eff	[ɛfː]
Gg	ge	[keː]
Hh	há	[hɔaː]
Ii	fyrra i ("leading i")	[ˈfɪɹːa iː]
Íí	fyrra í ("leading í")	[ˈfɪɹːa ʊiː]
Jj	jodd	[jɔtː]
Kk	ká	[kʰɔaː]
Ll	ell	[ɛlː]
Mm	emm	[ɛmː]
Nn	enn	[ɛnː]
Oo	o	[oː]
Óó	ó	[ɔuː]
Pp	pe	[pʰeː]
Rr	err	[ɛɹː]
Ss	ess	[ɛsː]
Tt	te	[tʰeː]
Uu	u	[uː]
Úú	ú	[ʉuː]
Vv	ve	[veː]
Yy	seinna i ("latter i")	[ˈsaiːtna iː]
Ýý	seinna í ("latter í")	[ˈsaiːtna ʊiː]
Ææ	seinna a ("latter a")	[ˈsaiːtna ɛaː]
Øø	ø	[øː]
Obsolete letters
Xx	eks	[ɛʰks]

- Eth ⟨ð⟩ (Faroese edd) never appears at the beginning of a word, which means its majuscule form ⟨Ð⟩ rarely occurs except in situations where all-capital letters are used, such as on maps.
- ⟨Ø⟩ can also be written ⟨ö⟩ in poetic language, such as Föroyar ('the Faroes'). This has to do with different orthographic traditions (Danish–Norwegian for ⟨ø⟩ and Icelandic for ⟨ö⟩). Originally, both forms were used, depending on the historical form of the word; ⟨ø⟩ was used when the vowel resulted from I-mutation of /o/ while ⟨ö⟩ was used when the vowel resulted from U-mutation of /a/. In handwriting, ⟨ő⟩ is sometimes used.
- While ⟨c⟩, ⟨q⟩, ⟨w⟩, ⟨x⟩, and ⟨z⟩ are not found in the Faroese language, ⟨x⟩ was known in earlier versions of Hammershaimb's orthography, such as ⟨Saxun⟩ for Saksun.
- While the Faroese keyboard layout allows one to write in Latin, English, Danish, Swedish, Norwegian, Finnish, etc., the Old Norse and Modern Icelandic letter ⟨þ⟩ is missing. In related Faroese words, it is written as either ⟨t⟩ or ⟨h⟩. If an Icelandic name has to be transcribed, ⟨th⟩ is common.

== Spelling-to-sound correspondence ==
This section lists Faroese letters and letter combinations and their phonemic representation in the International Phonetic Alphabet.

=== Vowels ===
Faroese keyboard layout

Faroese vowels may be either long or short, but this distinction is only relevant in stressed syllables: the only unstressed vowels (at least in native words) are [a, ɪ, ʊ]. Vowel length is determined by the number of consonants that follow the vowel: if there is only one consonant (i.e., CVCV or CVC# syllable structure), the vowel is long; if there are more than one (CVCCV), counting geminates and pre-aspirated stops as CC, the vowel is short. In addition to long monophthongs, Faroese also has diphthongs, which are always long. There are, however, some exceptions to the vowel length rule:

1. A vowel is long if it precedes a consonant combination ⟨b, d, g, k, p, s, t⟩ + ⟨j, l, r⟩. Examples include akrar, epli, møblar. The situation is however more complex, as seen below:
  - When the second consonant is ⟨j⟩, as in vekja, vitja, and tysja, the combination is treated as one sound (see below), and thus the vowel is long. However, the vowel before ⟨pj⟩ is short.
  - ⟨tl⟩ is not considered to be a consonant cluster, so the vowel preceding it is short.
2. In loanwords before ⟨kv⟩, the vowel is optionally long.
3. The genitive suffix ⟨-s⟩ does not affect the vowel length; e.g., báts, skips.

Vowels
Grapheme	Sound (IPA)			Examples
Grapheme	Short	Long	Before ⟨a, ða, ga⟩	Examples
a	[a]	[ɛaː]	[eː]	spakt [spakt] "calm (n)" spakur [ˈspɛaː(ʰ)kʊɹ] "calm (m)"
á	[ɔ]	[ɔaː]	[oː]	vátt [vɔʰtː] "wet (n)" vátur [ˈvɔaːtʊɹ] "wet (m)"
e	[ɛ]	[eː]	[iː~eː]	frekt [fɹɛʰkt] "greedy (n)" frekur [ˈfɹeːkʊɹ] "greedy (m)"
ei	[ai]	[aiː]		feitt [faiʰtː] "fat (n)" feitur [ˈfaiːtʊɹ] "fat (m)"
ey	[ɛ]	[ɛiː]		deytt [tɛʰtː] "dead (n)" deyður [ˈteiːjʊɹ] "dead (m)"
i	[ɪ]	[iː]		lint [lɪn̥t] "soft (n)" linur [ˈliːnʊɹ] "soft (m)"
í	[ʊi]	[ʊiː]		hvítt [kfʊiʰtː] "white (n)" hvítur [ˈkfʊiːtʊɹ] "white (m)"
o	[ɔ]	[oː]	[uː~oː]	toldi [tʰɔltɪ] "endured" tola [ˈtʰoːla] "to endure"
ó	[œ]	[ɔuː]		tómt [tʰœm̥t] "empty (n)" tómur [ˈtʰɔuːmʊɹ] "empty (m)"
oy	[ɔi]	[ɔiː]		gloymdi [ˈklɔiːmtɪ] "forgot" gloyma [ˈklɔiːma] "to forget"
u	[ʊ]	[uː]		gult [kʊl̥t] "yellow (n)" gulur [ˈkuːlʊɹ] "yellow (m)"
ú	[ʏ]	[ʉuː]		fúlt [fʏl̥t] "foul (n)" fúlur [ˈfʉuːlʊɹ] "foul (m)"
y	[ɪ]	[iː]		yls [ˈɪls] "warmth's (m)" ylur [ˈiːlʊr̥] "warmth (m)"
ý	[ʊi]	[ʊiː]		týskt [tʰʊiskt] "German (n)" týskur [ˈtʰʊiːskʊɹ] "German (m)"
æ	[a]	[ɛaː]	[eː]	mætt [maʰtː] "nice (n)" mætur [ˈmɛaːtʊɹ] "nice (m)"
ø	[œ]	[øː]		høgt [hœkt] "high (n)" høgur [ˈhøːʋʊɹ] "high (m)"

=== Consonants ===
Consonants
Grapheme	Phonetic realization (IPA)	Examples
b	[p]	bátur [ˈpɔaːʰtʊɹ] "boat"
d	[t]	dýr [tiːɹ] "animal"
dj	[t͡ʃ]	djúpur [ˈt͡ʃʉuːpʊɹ] "deep"
ð	between vowels: See #Glide insertion for more information.	
ð	other contexts: Ø	borð [poːɹ] "table"
f	[f]	fiskur [ˈfɪskʊɹ] "fish"
ft	in the words aftan (adverb), aftur, eftir and lyfta: [tː ~ ʰt]	aftan [ˈatːan] "behind"
ft	other contexts: [ft]	aftan [ˈaftan] "evening (before a saint's holiday)"
g	before e, i, í or ey, when not a loanword or pet name: [t͡ʃ]	gildi [ˈt͡ʃɪltɪ] "celebration"
g	between vowels: See #Glide insertion for more information.	
g	in the suffixes -igt, -ligt and -ugt (neuter forms): Ø	merkiligt [ˈmɛɹ̥kʰɪlɪʰt] "remarkable (n)"
g	before n, in past participles: [t]	slignir [ˈslɪtnɪɹ] "mown (m pl)"
g	other contexts: [k]	góður [ˈkɔuːwʊɹ] "good"
gj	[t͡ʃ]	gjógv [ˈt͡ʃɛkf] "ravine"
h	[h]	hús [hʉuːs] "house"
hj	before a vowel and two consonants: [j]	hjálp [jɔɬp] "help"
hj	other contexts: [t͡ʃ]	hjól [ˈt͡ʃʰɔuːl] "wheel"
hv	[kʰv]	hvalur [ˈkʰvɛaːlʊɹ] "whale"
j	[j]	jól [jɔuːɬ] "Christmas"
k	before e, i, í or ey, when not before a vowel or a loanword: [t͡ʃʰ]	kensla [ˈt͡ʃʰɛnsla] "feeling"
k	other contexts: [kʰ]	kongur [ˈkʰɔŋkʊɹ] "king"
kj	[t͡ʃʰ]	kjósa [ˈt͡ʃʰɔusa] "to choose"
kk	before i [t͡ʃː ~ ʰt͡ʃ]	politikkin [pʰolɪˈtɪt͡ʃːɪn] "the policy (acc)"
kk	other contexts: [kː ~ ʰk]	klokka [ˈkʰlɔkːa] "clock"
l	before a voiceless consonant, or word finally after a voiceless consonant: [ɬ]	milt [ˈmɪɬt] "spleen"
l	other contexts: [l]	linur [ˈliːnʊɹ] "soft"
ll	in a few words: [lː]	bolli [ˈbɔlːɪ] "dumpling"
ll	other contexts: [t͡ɬ]	fjall [ˈfjat͡ɬ] "mountain"
m	[m]	maður [ˈmɛaːvʊɹ] "man"
n	[n]	navn [naun] "name"
ng	before e, i, í or ey: [ɲt͡ʃ]	ungi [ˈʊɲt͡ʃɪ] "fledgling"
ng	other contexts: [ŋk]	langur [ˈlɛŋkʊɹ] "long"
nk	before e, i, í or ey: [ɲ̊t͡ʃ]	bonki [ˈpɔɲ̊t͡ʃɪ] "bench (dat)"
nk	other contexts: [ŋ̊k]	banka [ˈpɛŋ̊ka] "to knock"
nj	[ɲ ~ nj]	
nn	after diphthongs: [tn]	seinni [ˈsaitnɪ] "later"
nn	other contexts: [nː]	renna [ˈɹɛnːa] "to run"
p	[pʰ]	pípa [ˈpʰʊiːpa] "pipe"
pp	[ʰp]	heppin [ˈhɛʰpɪn] "lucky"
r	[ɹ ~ ɻ]	rógva [ˈɹɛɡva] "to row"
s	[s]	síða [ˈsʊiːja] "page"
sj	[ʃ]	sjálvur [ˈʃɔlvʊɹ] "self"
sk	before e, i, í or ey, word initially: [ʃ]	skip [ʃiːp] "ship"
sk	before e, i, í or ey, word internally: [st͡ʃ]	elski [ˈɛɬst͡ʃɪ] "I love"
sk	other contexts: [sk]	skúli [ˈskʉulɪ] "school"
skj	[ʃ]	skjótt [ʃœtː] "quickly"
stj	[ʃ]	stjørna [ˈʃœtna] "star"
t	[tʰ]	tá [tʰɔa] "toe"
tj	[t͡ʃʰ]	tjóð [t͡ʃʰɔuːw] "people"
tt	[tː ~ ʰt]	brott [ˈpɹɔtː] "away"
v	before a voiceless consonant: [f]	skeivt [ˈskaift] "wrong (n)"
v	other contexts: [v ~ ʋ]	vatn [ˈvaʰtn̥] "water"

=== Special combinations ===
There are special combinations of vowels and consonants with unexpected pronunciations in Faroese.

Special combinations
Grapheme	Phonetic realisation (IPA)	Examples
ógv	[ɛkv]	nógv [ˈnɛkv] "plenty (f)"
úgv	[ɪkv]	kúgv [ˈkʰɪkv] "cow (f)"
ígg, ýgg	before i or j: [ʊtɕː]	síggi [ˈsʊtɕːɪ] "I see (ind.prs)"
oygg	before i or j: [ɔtɕː]	hoyggj [ˈhɔtɕː] "hay (m)"
ang	before i: [ɛɲtɕ]	langir [ˈlɛɲtɕɪɹ̥] "long (pl)"

== Glide insertion ==
Faroese avoids having a hiatus between two vowels by inserting a glide. Orthographically, this is shown in three ways:

1. vowel + ⟨ð⟩ + vowel
2. vowel + ⟨g⟩ + vowel
3. vowel + vowel

Typically, the first vowel is long and in words with two syllables always stressed, while the second vowel is short and unstressed. In Faroese, short and unstressed vowels can only be /a, i, u/.

Glide insertion
First vowel	Second vowel			Examples
First vowel	i [ɪ]	u [ʊ]	a [a]	Examples
i, y [iː]	[j]	[j]	[j]	sigið, siður, siga
í, ý [ʊiː]	[j]	[j]	[j]	mígi, mígur, míga
ey [ɛiː]	[j]	[j]	[j]	reyði, reyður, reyða
ei [aiː]	[j]	[j]	[j]	reiði, reiður, reiða
oy [ɔiː]	[j]	[j]	[j]	noyði, royður, royða
u [uː]	[w]	[w]	[w]	suði, mugu, suða
ó [ɔuː]	[w]	[w]	[w]	róði, róðu, Nóa
ú [ʉuː]	[w]	[w]	[w]	búði, búðu, túa
a, æ [ɛaː]	[j]	[v]	∅	ræði, æðu, glaða
á [ɔaː]	[j]	[v]	∅	ráði, fáur, ráða
e [eː]	[j]	[v]	∅	gleði, legu, gleða
o [oː]	[j]	[v]	∅	togið, smogu, roða
ø [øː]	[j]	[v]	∅	løgin, røðu, høgan

The value of the glide is determined by the surrounding vowels:

1. [j]
  - "I-surrounding, type 1" – after ⟨i, y, í, ý, ei, ey, oy⟩: bíða [ˈbʊija] (to wait), deyður [ˈdɛijʊɹ] (dead), seyður [ˈsɛijʊɹ] (sheep)
  - "I-surrounding, type 2" – between any vowel (except "u-vowels" ⟨ó, u, ú⟩) and ⟨i⟩: kvæði [ˈkvɛaje] (ballad), øði [ˈøːjɪ] (rage).
2. [w]
  - "U-surrounding, type 1" – after ⟨ó, u, ú⟩: Óðin [ˈɔʊwɪn] (Odin), góðan morgun! [ˌɡɔʊwan ˈmɔɹɡʊn] (good morning!), suður [ˈsuːwʊɹ] (south), slóða [ˈslɔʊwa] (to make a trace).
3. [v]
  - "U-surrounding, type 2" – between ⟨a, á, e, o, æ, ø⟩ and ⟨u⟩: áður [ˈɔavʊɹ] (before), leður [ˈleːvʊɹ] (leather), í klæðum [ʊɪˈklɛavʊn] (in clothes), í bløðum [ʊɪˈbløːvʊn] (in newspapers).
  - "A-surrounding, type 2"
    - These are exceptions (there is also a regular pronunciation): æða [ˈɛava] (eider-duck).
    - The past participles always have [j]: elskaðar [ˈɛlskajaɹ] (beloved, nom., acc. fem. pl.)
4. Silent
  - "A-surrounding, type 1" – between ⟨a, á, e, o⟩ and ⟨a⟩ and in some words between ⟨æ, ø⟩ and ⟨a⟩: ráða [ˈɹɔːa] (to advise), gleða [ˈɡ̊leːa] (to gladden, please), boða [ˈboːa] (to forebode), kvøða [ˈkvøːa] (to chant), røða [ˈɹøːa] (to make a speech)

== See also ==
- Faroese language
- Faroese Braille
- Icelandic orthography
- Danish orthography
- Norwegian orthography

== Bibliography ==
- Árnason, Kristján (2011), The Phonology of Icelandic and Faroese, Oxford University Press, ISBN 978-0199229314
- Þráinsson, Höskuldur (2004), Faroese: An Overview and Reference Grammar, Føroya Fróðskaparfelag, ISBN 978-9991841854
- Lockwood, W. B. (2002), An Introduction to Modern Faroese (4th, unaltered ed.), Tórshavn: Føroya Skúlabókagrunnur, ISBN 99918-0-295-9
- Peterson, Hjalmar P.; Voeltzel, Laurence (2025). Lahiri, Aditi (ed.). Faroese Phonetics and Phonology. Phonology and Phonetics. Vol. 34. De Gruyter Mouton. p. 376. ISBN 978-3110750553.
