= Jakobsson =

Jakobsson is a surname of Icelandic or Swedish origin. It may refer to the following notable people:

- Andreas Jakobsson (born 1972), Swedish professional football player
- Åsa Jakobsson (born 1966), Swedish football player
- Ejler Jakobsson (1911–1986), American science-fiction author and editor
- Evert Jakobsson (1886–1960), Finnish Olympic track and field athlete
- Fritz Jakobsson (born 1940), Finnish painter
- Gunnar Jakobsson, Finnish figure skater
- Jarl Jakobsson (1880–1951), Finnish Olympic track and field athlete
- Johan Jakobsson (born 1987), Swedish handball player
- Kristian Jakobsson (born 1996), Swedish ice hockey player
- Leif Jakobsson (born 1955), Swedish politician; member of the Riksdag since 2002
- Louise Etzner Jakobsson (born 1960), Swedish para-equestrian
- Ludowika Jakobsson (1884–1968), Finnish-German Olympic figure skater
- Markus Jakobsson (born 1968), American computer security researcher and entrepreneur
- Menotti Jakobsson (1892–1970), Swedish skier
- Naomi Jakobsson (born 1941), American politician from Illinois; state legislator since 2003
- Nina Jakobsson (born 1990), Swedish footballer
- Sofia Jakobsson (born 1990), Swedish footballer
- Torsten Jakobsson (born 1957), Swedish skier
- Walter Jakobsson (1882–1957), Finnish Olympic figure skater

== See also ==
- Jacobsson
