= Shetland dialect =

Language of Shetland

- Shaetlan, Shetlandic, Shetland
- Shaetlan
- Christine De Luca speaking her mother tongue.
- Pronunciation: [ˈʃe̞tlən]
- Native to: United Kingdom
- Region: Shetland
- Ethnicity: Shetlanders
- Native speakers: Approx. 6,500-11,000 (~30%-50% of Shetland population) (2022) (Note: As of the last Scottish census in 2022, the only relevant language questions were asked in terms of ability in Scots, but many Shetlanders do not identify the language as Scots. The Aye Can website was set up to encourage census respondents to answer the Scots language ability question in terms of their own variety (on the basis they consider it a dialect of Scots), however the effect on census responses is unclear. In August 2025 I Hear Dee launched a campaign to get Shaetlan added as a named language to the next Scottish census, and shortly after during a visit to Shetland, the First Minister of Scotland John Swinney stated the "door was open" to include Shaetlan on the next census.)
- Language family: Indo-European; Germanic; North Germanic; West Scandinavian; Insular Scandinavian; Norn; Shetland; Insular Scots; Scots; Anglic; Anglo-Frisian; North Sea Germanic; West Germanic; Germanic; Indo-European
- Early form: Proto Norse; Old West Norse; Norn; Shetland; Early Scots; Northumbrian Old English; Old English
- Writing system: Latin script (Shetland alphabet)

Language codes
- ISO 639-3: scz
- Glottolog: shet1241 Shaetlan
- Linguasphere: 52-ABA-aad
- IETF: scz
- Shetland's location in the North Sea with Norway to the east and mainland Scotland to the south.

Shetland dialect (Note: Though the exonym "Shetland dialect" has found wide use based on the presumption that it is a dialect of some other language (usually English or Scots), the variety has international recognition as a language in its own right. The activist group I Hear Dee consistently uses the autonym Shaetlan, as opposed to "Shetland dialect".) (Shaetlan (Note: This spelling has been used to refer to the language (distinct from the place-name) since at least 1988.) [ˈʃe̞tlən], also variously known as Shetland or Shetlandic) is a mixed language spoken in Shetland, an archipelago to the north of mainland Scotland. The exact number of speakers is not known, since it has to date never been included in any census. It emerged through the long-drawn and stable bilingualism of Norn (the language of the previous settlers) and Scots (mainly the varieties from Fife and Lothian) brought to Shetland from the early 15th century and onwards. Norn is an extinct North Germanic language, descended from Western Norse, which was spoken in Shetland until the late 19th century, though as of 2025, living memory reports the last known speaker to have died as late as 1925. This long-drawn contact situation resulted in a very distinct linguistic blend of Norn and Scots, with a noticeable contact influence of Low Germanic languages (Middle Dutch and Middle Low German). It has been recognised as a highly distinct variety for centuries. The language retains many words of Norn origin. Many of them, if they are not place-names, refer to e.g. seasons, weather, topographical features, sea scapes (especially types of waves and states of the sea), fishing, parts of boats and boat building, agriculture and crofting, crops and livestock, wool handling and knitting, peat cutting, stone building, music instrument building, and so on.

The language is a prototypical contact language in that it emerged due to a specific contact situation, as opposed to a high contact language, which has undergone a high degree of contact, but which has not emerged due to some specific contact situation. In addition, the language is a prototypical G-L (Grammar-Lexicon) mixed language, where the bulk of the grammar comes from the language of the original settlers and the bulk of the vocabulary comes from the new settlers.

The language aligns with both the Continental Scandinavian varieties and the Anglian varieties in having limited morphological fusion, with a few grammatical affixes and some non-linear ablaut (vowel gradation), mainly in the temporal paradigms, with both strong and weak verbs. It has a rich word formation in compounding, similar to German and the Scandinavian languages. The pronominal system has two politeness distinctions (familiar/polite) and two numbers (singular/plural), and has three demonstrative distances (proximate/distal/remote). The nominal system has grammatical gender (masculine/feminine/neuter), expressed pronominally.

The language has traditionally been classified as, variously, a dialect of Scots or a dialect of English. It is classified by Glottolog under Insular Scots alongside Orcadian Scots. However, the grammar of the language is remarkably aligned with that of Continental Scandinavian, while the lexicon is quite heterogenous. The vocabulary is thus a blend of Anglian and Norn, with a noticeable component of Dutch/Low German loanwords. On 15th October 2025, the language was formally recognised as a language by ISO 639 Maintenance Agency SIL Global and given the ISO 639-3 code scz. As of 2025, the language has not been accepted as an official language in Shetland, and has never been used as an official medium of instruction in education, other than as a curiosity in occasional creative sessions. It has been used in fictional writing since at least the 19th century, especially in poetry, children's books, and comic strips or satire. Dictionaries of the language have been compiled and published since the mid-19th century.

== Formation ==
Shetland had been settled by a Celtic-speaking population by the time the Western Norse expansion started in the late 8th century. The majority seems to have belonged to the Pictish linguistic and cultural sphere, but it is possible that there were also Gaelic speaking Christian missionaries on the islands when the first Norse seafarers arrived. Exactly when this was is debated, but evidence suggests that the first settlements were as early as about 790–800 AD. It is also not known what happened to the pre-Norse population. Suggestions have been made that Shetland was completely depopulated in the catastrophic climate events of the mid-6th century, though this is debated. Shetland, together with Orkney and Caithness, was incorporated into the Kingdom of Norway in 875 as the Earldom of Orkney. However, in 1195 Shetland was placed directly under the rule of the Norwegian king and was made a tributary province to Norway, paying tax directly to the Norwegian king and ruled by the king's sysselman ('governor'). This meant that Shetland's links with Orkney gradually diminished, although they shared a bishop and remained closer linked in the clerical domain.

The linguistic ecology of Shetland and Orkney gradually continued to diverge for two main reasons. First, the Earldom of Orkney had been settled by a Scots speaking population from the middle of the 14th century. Second, there was an intense presence of the Hanseatic and Dutch North Sea fishing trade in Shetland (linking it with Bergen, Iceland and the Faroe islands), bringing with it an intense and sustained contact with Dutch and Low Germanic speakers in the late medieval and early modern period, whereas there was much less of a Low Germanic trade presence in Orkney during these centuries. This trade contact was not only long drawn, but also intense as well as steady, with numerous Hanseatic trading stations dotted all over Shetland. Some of these trading stations were large enough to resemble small settlements, and were inhabited for weeks, sometimes months, and sometimes over the entire winter. This contact would continue until the French and Napoleonic wars, and nearly seamlessly move from Hanseatic trade to the Dutch fishing trade. It was especially the trade for knitwear which made the Dutch fishing fleet arrive in the hundreds. This is also what gave rise to the town of Lerwick.

Lowland Scots speakers increasingly started settling in Shetland from the early 15th century onwards, especially in the southern areas of Shetland. The settlers were predominantly connected to the clergy, but were also landowners, administrators, traders and craftsmen. Lowland Scots increasingly established itself in Shetland in a socioeconomic top-down spread.

Shetland came under Danish rule with the union of Norway and Denmark in 1380. In 1468 Christian I of Denmark pawned Orkney to James III of Scotland as part of the dowry for Princess Margaret, then subsequently pawned Shetland in May 1469 as the second part of the dowry. There was a gradual administrative shift to Scottish rule, and the Lowlands Scots settlement also gradually increased. But Shetland remained a multilingual place, as reported by contemporary testimonies:

The Inhabitants of the South Parish are, for the most part, Strangers from Scotland & Orkney, whose Language, Habit, Manners & Dispositions are almost ye same with the Scotish. [...] Their Language (as I said) is the same with the Scotish: yet all the Natives can speak the Gothick or Norwegian Tongue. [...] by reason of their Commerce with the Hollanders, generally they promptly speak low Dutch. The Inhabitants of the North Parish are (very few excepted) Natives of the place [...] All the inhabitants of this Parish can speak the Gothick or Norwegian Language, & seldom speak other among themselves; yet all of them speak the Scotish Tongue both more promptly & more properly, than generally they do in Scotland.

— James Key, minister of Dunrossness during 1680s, Description of ye Countrey of Zetland, John Bruce.

English is the common language among them, yet many of the people speak Norse or corrupt Danish, especially such as live in the more northern isles; yea, so ordinary is it in some places, that it is the first language their children speak. Several here also speak good Dutch, even servants, though they have never been out of the country, because of the many Dutch ships which do frequent their ports. And there are some who have something of all these languages, English, Dutch and Norse.

— John Brand, Scottish missionary 1700, A Brief Description of Orkney: Zetland, Pightland-Firth & Caithness, quoted in Brand (1701).

Many of them are descended from the Norwegians and speak a Norse Tongue, corrupted, (they call Norn) amongst themselves [...] and because of their Commerce with the Hollanders, they promptly speak Low Dutch. [...] The Incommers [sic] (whose residence in these Isles is not above a few Centuries of years) [...] speak the Scots Language as well as the Norse.

— Various informants no later than 1710, The Description of the Isles of Orkney and Zetland, Sir Robert Sibbald.

The "Commerce with the Hollanders" mentioned in the quote above refers to the intense trade for knitwear mentioned above.

Norn gradually declined, but remained spoken in Shetland at least until the early 19th century, if not later. Shetland would thus have been bilingual until at least then, but it is likely that it was a displacive contact situation, since Scots was the language of the new power holders. Archival evidence indicates that law and administrative officials in Orkney were unable and/or unwilling to recognise the speech of the local population; various documented complaints indicate that this kind of unwillingness and contempt on the part of the ruling class also occurred in Shetland.

The last known speaker of Norn is usually named as Walter Sutherland of Skaw in Unst (born c. 1783, died 10 August 1850. However, as of 2025, living memory names Jane Ratter (born 13 December 1864, died 6 February 1956) of Foula as a rememberer of Norn songs, verses and riddles, and names her mother, Janet Manson (born 10 December 1827, died 5 August 1925) as the last known person who used Norn conversationally. As of 2025, living testimony states that Janet Manson would speak it with one of her neighbours, an unnamed man. However, Janet and her neighbour did not call their language "Norn", but Danska Tonga.

=== Status as a mixed language ===
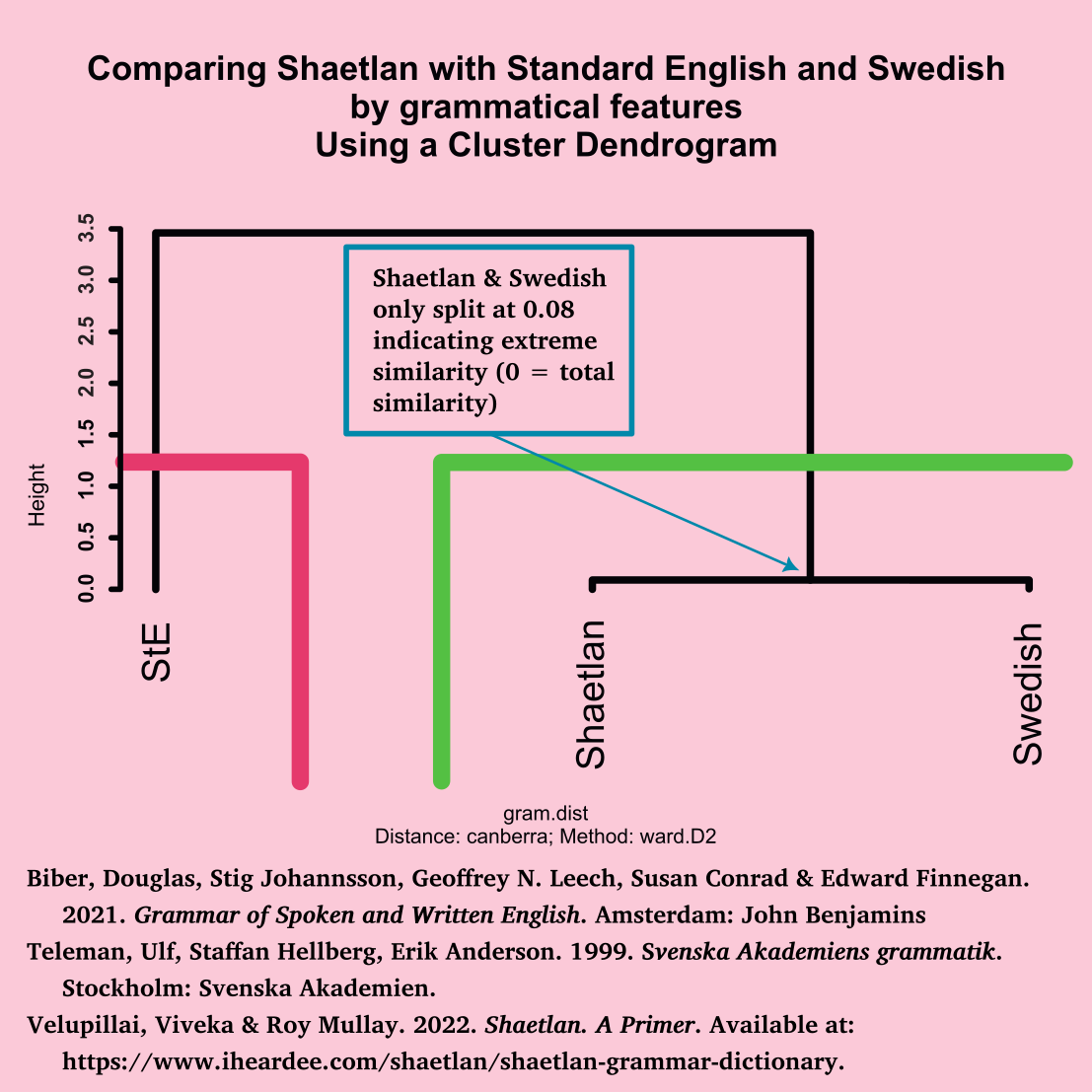
A cluster dendrogram comparing the grammatical features of the language with Standard English and Swedish. It only splits with Swedish at 0.08, indicating extreme similarity (0 = total similarity).

A phylogenetic network showing the relationship between the relevant languages in the Shetland linguistic ecology, based on their respective Swadesh 100-lists

The long drawn and stable multilingualism between the 15th and 18th centuries resulted in the distinct blend that would become the pre-English language now spoken in Shetland. The fact that it arose in a specific contact situation by definition makes it a Contact Language. Specifically, it aligns with a prototypical G-L Mixed Language. It aligns with Bakker's 2017 model, which proposes that G-L languages will have the bulk of their grammar from the language of the original settlers and the bulk of their lexicon from the language of the new, more socioeconomically dominant settlers: in a cluster dendrogram the grammar of the language is near-identical to contemporary Continental Scandinavian grammar, while a phylogenetic network of the Swadesh 100-list of shows the language on the Anglian branch, but much more removed than Scots and English are from each other. The vocabulary is thus more heterogenous than the grammar.

== Phonology ==
=== Consonants ===
The language has 27 phonemic consonants:

Consonants
		Labial	Dental	Alveolar	Palatal (–alveolar)	Velar		Glottal
		Labial	Dental	Alveolar	Palatal (–alveolar)	plain	lab.	Glottal
Nasal		m		n	ɲ	ŋ		
Plosive	voiceless	p	t̪^{1}			k		
Plosive	voiced	b	d̪^{1}			ɡ		
Affricate			ts		tʃ			
Fricative	voiceless	f	θ	s	ʃ	x	ʍ	h
Fricative	voiced	v		z	ʒ			
Approximant				l ɫ	j		w	
Trill				r				

1. The coronal stops are true dentals (not alveolars). However, Shetlanders are consistent in their code switching: the coronals are consistently dentals (/t̪, d̪/), unless Shetland English is spoken, in which case they are consistently alveolar.

=== Vowels ===
Like all Germanic languages, the language is vowel rich. There are 12 phonemic monophthongs and 7 diphthongs:

Monophthongs
	Front		Back	
	unrounded	rounded	unrounded	rounded
Close	i	y		u
Close-mid	e	ø		o
Mid	e̞			
Open-mid	ɛ			ɔ
Open	a		ɑ	ɒ

Diphthongs
	Front			Back	
	fronting	backing	centring		fronting
Close-mid			eɜ eɐ	oɐ	
Open-mid	ɛɪ				ɔɪ
Open	aɪ	au			

Vowel length is by and large determined by the Scottish Vowel Length Rule, although there are a few exceptions.

==== Lexical sets ====
In terms of lexical set values, the language has been described as follows:

Aitken	1l	1s	8a	10	2	11	3	4	5	6	7	8	9	12	13	14	15	16	17	18	19
	/ae/	/əi/			/i/	/iː/^{1}	/e/^{2}	/e/	/ɔ/	/u/	/y, ø/^{3}	/eː/^{4}	/oe/	/ɑː/	/ʌu/	/ju/	/ɪ/^{5}	/ɛ/^{6}	/a~æ/^{7}	/ɔ/	/ʌ/

1. Vowel 11 occurs stem final.
2. Vowel 3 is often retracted or diphthongised or may sometimes be realised [i].
3. Vowel 7 may be realised [u] before /r/ and [ju] before /k/ and /x/.
4. Vowel 8 is generally merged with vowel 4, often realised [ɛ] or [æː] before /r/. The realisation in the cluster ane may be [i] as in Mid Northern Scots.
5. Vowel 15 may be realised [ɛ̈~ë] or diphthongised to [əi] before /x/.
6. Vowel 16 may be realised [e] or [æ].
7. Vowel 17 often merges with vowel 12 before /nd/ and /l, r/.

=== Syllable structure ===
The language allows complex syllables of up to three onset and coda consonants.

V	CV/VC	CCV/VCC	CVC	CCVCC	CCCVCCC
a, ee 'one'	coo 'cow'	kloo 'ball of yarn'	sook 'suck'	staand 'stand'	strents 'strengths'
a, ee 'one'	at 'that'	aert 'earth'	sook 'suck'	staand 'stand'	strents 'strengths'

== Orthography ==
Like most stigmatised languages in a displacive contact situation, it has been in the double bind of not being standardised, therefore not being regarded as a language, and because it is not regarded as a language, there is opposition to any kind of standardisation. Yet, Shetlanders have been writing in their mother tongue since the mid-19th century, if not longer, as evidenced by the large body of especially poetry and dictionaries, but also children's books, comics and satires. Like with any stigmatised non-standard variety of highly literate communities, this has led to a variation of spelling, which is mostly an individual intuitive phonetic spelling. This variation to a certain extent also represents the varied pronunciation of the language varieties. However, the last couple of decades has seen a community consensus in digitalk (the informal "speech" used predominantly on handheld devices with a virtual keyboard, especially in such domains as Facebook, instant messaging of various kinds (SMS, WhatsApp, etc), and so on).

Latterly the use of the apologetic apostrophe to represent 'missing' English letters has been discouraged. A fully functional orthography was developed by Da Shaetlan Projict / I Hear Dee and has been used consistently in all their output.

=== Alphabet ===
The standard orthography developed by I Hear Dee uses a 28-letter Latin script alphabet:

Uppercase letters
A	B	C	D	E	F	G	H	I	J	K	L	M	N	O	P	Q	R	S	T	U	V	W	X	Y	Z	Ø	Ü
Lowercase letters
a	b	c	d	e	f	g	h	i	j	k	l	m	n	o	p	q	r	s	t	u	v	w	x	y	z	ø	ü

== Morphology ==
The language allows both compounding and derivation. The derivational affixes are mostly Anglian, but there are some Dutch examples, such as the diminutive -kin < Middle Dutch -kijn/-ken.

Grammatical functions are for the most part expressed analytically, through there are a few concatenative grammatical markers, such as the genitive marker or a few tense/aspect markers. The language, like all Germanic languages, has both strong and weak verbs, with a rich ablaut system for the latter.

== Grammar ==
The grammar of the language aligns extremely closely with the Continental Scandinavian languages (see dendrogram in #Status as a Mixed Language).

=== Noun phrase ===
==== Nouns ====
The nouns of the language have two numbers - singular and plural; and three genders - masculine, feminine and neuter. The genders are expressed pronominally: concrete count nouns are either masculine or feminine, while abstract nouns and mass nouns are neuter. New, modern items are assigned genders, such as laptop (M) and mobile phone (F). Weather and time dummies are masculine.

There is a prolific associative plural an dem.

==== Pronouns ====
Personal pronouns have two numbers, three persons and three genders in the third person singular. There is a politeness distinction for singular addressees.

	Singular		Plural	
	Subject	Object	Subject	Object
1	I	me	we	wis
2	du (familiar)/you (polite)	dee (familiar)/you (polite)	you	you
3m	he	him	dey	dem
3f	shø	her	dey	dem
3n	(h)it	it	dey	dem

The politeness distinctions in the language follows a T–V distinction in that the familiar form is used by parents when speaking to children, old persons speaking to younger ones, or between familiar friends or equals and the polite form is used in formal situations and when speaking to superiors.

Both the dependent and the independent possessive pronouns inflect for two numbers, three persons and three genders in the third person singular.

Dependent possessive pronouns
	Singular	Plural
1	my/mi	wir
2	dy/di	yir
3m	his	dir
3f	her	dir
3n	hits	dir

Independent possessive pronouns
	Singular		Plural
	sg.N	pl.N	Plural
1	mine	mines	wirs
2	dine	dines	yirs
3m	his		dirs
3f	hers		dirs
3n	(h)its		dirs

In the basi- and mesolectal varieties, the 1st and 2nd sg independent possessives agree with the number of the noun they refer to, a feature that was noticed already in the late 19th century. Acrolectal varieties have lost this feature.

The demonstrative is number invariant and has a three-way distal system: dis/yun/dat (proximate/distal/remote).

There are stressed and unstressed reflexive pronouns, which inflect for politeness in 2sg (with the 2sg polite form distinct from the 2pl form).

Reflexive pronouns
	Singular		Plural	
	Stressed	Unstressed	Stressed	Unstressed
1	mesel	me	wirsels	wir
2	deesel (familiar)/yirsel (polite)	dee (familiar)/you (polite)	yirsels	you
3m	himsel	him	demsels	dem
3f	hersel	her	demsels	dem
3n	(h)itsel	(h)it	demsels	dem

The indefinite article a is invariant. The definite article da [/də/] is used in more contexts than in Standard English.

- gyaan tidda kirk/da skül idda Simmer-- 'go to church/school in summer'
- da denner is reidy 'dinner is ready'
- hae da caald 'have a cold'

=== Verb phrase ===
Like all Germanic languages, it has both strong and weak verbs. The language has a number of reflexive verbs, which take the unstressed form of the reflexive pronoun as the second argument. Like in most languages with reflexive verbs, they are often verbs that involve change of location or posture. This does not translate well into Standard English, since the equivalent verbs are intransitive in Standard English.

==== Tense-aspect-mood ====
The past tense is marked with the suffix –(e)d/-(i)t with weak verbs or nonlinearly with strong verbs. The perfect tense is universally marked with a form of be. Modality is expressed with modal verbs.

==== Syntax ====
The language has a mirative copula come tae be 'it turns out that...'. There is an existential marker which inflects for the present and past tense: de ir 'there is' and de wir 'there was', where de < Norn de < Old Norse þet, the weak ablaut n.sg.nom/acc form of the demonstrative þat and ir/wir < Norn er 'is' / var 'was' from vera/vesa 'be'.

The language has an invariant negator no for lexical verbs and a negative suffix -na for auxiliaries.

Tags are formed with the negative tag suffix –(e)n + the personal pronoun in the subject form.

The default imperative has postverbal pronoun_{subj} retention. Reflexive verbs show both pronoun_{subj} retention and the object argument.

Like most languages of the world, it lacks relative pronouns, and marks relativisation with an invariant clause marker at.

There is a prolific purposive fir tae clause marker.

==== Non-interchangeable function words ====
The language differentiates between the verbal particle (tae vb) and the directional preposition (til). It also audibly differentiates between the preposition fir 'for' ([/fər/] or [/fɪr/]) and the conjunction fur 'because' ([/fɞr/] or [/fɔr/]). This is very prevalent with basi-and mesolectal speakers, but less so with acrolectal speakers. Duration is expressed with in (contrary to Standard English for). The language also distinguishes between the conjunction so 'so' ([/so/]) and the adverb sae 'so' ([/se/]). Furthermore, the quantifier nae 'no' ([/ne/]) is audibly different from and not interchangeable with the negator no 'no' ([/no/]).

== Adoption ==
Ae day last ouk, whin I wis gaein' t' da eela, I met wir skülmaister. I gees him da time o' da day, an' spaekes bak an' fore, dan says he ta me, "Fat's yer wee bit loonie deein', that he's nae been at skoul syne Monday week?" Noo, sir, haed I been askin' dis questin I wid hae said-"What's your peerie boy düin' 'at he's no been at skül frae last Moninday? Noo, sir, I tink ony sensible person 'ill see 'at my wy is a guid as his. Da skülmaisters hae nae bishiness ta interfere wi' wir guid midder tongue. We pay dem fur laernin' bairns English, no fur unlaernin' wir Shetlan' speech.

— Unknown contributor writing in 1880 about a Scots-speaking schoolmaster teaching his son, Recollections o' da past. The Shetland Times.

Examples of language use
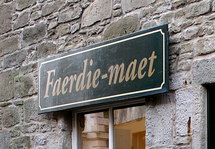
A takeaway sign in Lerwick, the business being named after a term for food taken on a journey.

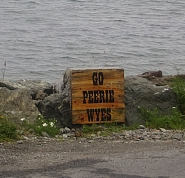
A sign in Hillswick advising drivers to proceed cautiously (literally "go little ways").

=== Shaetlan Language Plan ===
In July 2022 Dr. Beth Mouat of the University of the Highlands and Islands submitted the Shaetlan Language Plan to the Shetland College board. It was adopted in its totality and made public in September 2022. It was the first de facto recognition of the language by a major public body. The international reactions by linguists working with minority languages around the world was one of great support and encouragement.

The key aims of the Shaetlan Language Plan are to:

1. normalise Shaetlan
2. include Shaetlan in the next census
3. include Shaetlan in signage
4. bring Shaetlan into both L1 and L2 learning
5. produce education materials in Shaetlan
6. offer research projects on Shaetlan
7. bring new education offers in Shaetlan

In July 2026 the Scottish Funding Council announced they would begin collecting data for all students enrolling at colleges in Scotland allowing them to declare their first language as Shaetlan.

== Sources ==
- Aikhenvald, Alexandra Y. (2006). "Grammars in contact. A cross-linguistic perspective.". In Aikhenvald, Alexandra Y.; Dixon, R. M. W. (eds.). Grammars in contact. A Cross-linguistic Typology. Oxford: Oxford University Press. pp. 1–66. ISBN 978-0-19-920783-1.
- Angus, James Stout (1914). A glossary of the Shetland dialect. London: Simpkin, Marshall, Hamilton, Kent & Co.
- Auer, Peter (1999). "From codeswitching via language mixing to fused lects. Toward a dynamic typology of bilingual speech". International Journal of Bilingualism. 3 (4): 309–332. doi:10.1177/13670069990030040101.
- Ballantyne, John H.; Smith, Brian, eds. (1994). Shetland Documents 1580–1611. Lerwick: Shetland Islands Council & The Shetland Times. ISBN 0-900662-96-4.
- Ballantyne, John H.; Smith, Brian, eds. (1999). Shetland Documents 1195-1579. Lerwick: Shetland Islands Council & The Shetland Times. ISBN 1-898852-48-0.
- Barnes, Michael (1998). The Norn language of Orkney and Shetland. Lerwick: Shetland Times. ISBN 1-898852-29-4.
- Bakker, Peter; Matras, Yaron (2013). "Introduction". In Bakker, Peter; Matras, Yaron (eds.). Contact languages. A comprehensive guide. Boston & Berlin: Walter de Gruyter. pp. 1–14. doi:10.1515/9781614513711. ISBN 978-1-61451-476-3.
- Bakker, Peter (2017). "Typology of Mixed Languages". In Aikhenvald, Alexandra Y.; Dixon, R. M. W. (eds.). The Cambridge Handbook of Linguistic Typology. Cambridge: Cambridge University Press. pp. 217–253. doi:10.1017/9781316135716.008. ISBN 978-1-107-09195-5.
- Bickel, Balthasar; Nichols, Johanna (2007). Shopen, Timothy (ed.). "Inflectional morphology". Language Typology and Syntactic Description. III: Grammatical categories and the lexicon. Cambridge: Cambridge University Press: 169–240. doi:10.1017/CBO9780511618437. ISBN 978-0-511-61843-7.
- Bickel, Balthasar; Nichols, Johanna (2013). Matthew, Dryer; Haspelmath, Martin (eds.). "Fusion of selected inflectional formatives". WALS Online. v2020.4.
- Brand, John (1701). A Brief Description of Orkney: Zetland, Pightland-Firth & Caithness. Edinburgh: George Mosman.
- John, Bruce, ed. (1908). Description of ye Countrey of Zetland. Edinburgh: James Skinner & Co.
- Bugge, Edit (2007). Shetlan wirds. En studie av kjennskap til og oppfatninger om det shetlandske dialektordforrådet [Shetlan words. A study on the knowledge of and attitudes towards the vocabulary of the Shetland dialect] (MA thesis) (in Norwegian). Bergen: University of Bergen.
- Burgess, J. J. Haldane (1913). Rasmie's büddie: poems in the Shetlandic [Rasmie's basket] (in Shetlandic). Lerwick: T. & J. Manson.
- Catford, J. C. (1957). "Vowel-Systems of Scots Dialects". Transactions of the Philological Society. 56 (1): 107–117. doi:10.1111/j.1467-968X.1957.tb00571.x.
- Christie-Johnson, Alastair; Christie-Johnson, Adaline (2014). Shetland words: a dictionary of the Shetland dialect. Lerwick: Shetland Times. ISBN 978-1-904746-82-9.
- Christie-Johnson, Alastair; Christie-Johnson, Adaline (2024). Shetland words: a dictionary of the Shetland dialect (2nd ed.). Lerwick: Shetland Times. ISBN 978-1-904746-82-9.
- Comrie, Bernard; Kuteva, Tania (2013). Dryer, Matthew; Martin, Haspelmath (eds.). "Relativization on subjects". WALS Online (v2020.4).
- Corbett, Greville (1991). Gender. Cambridge: Cambridge University Press. ISBN 0-521-33845-X.
- Corbett, Greville (2007). Shopen, Timothy (ed.). "Gender and noun classes". Language Typology and Syntactic Description. III: Grammatical categories and the lexicon. Cambridge: Cambridge University Press: 241–279. doi:10.1017/CBO9780511618437.004. ISBN 978-0-521-58156-1.
- Crawford, Barbara (2013). The northern earldoms: Orkney and Caithness from AD 870 to 1470. Edinburgh: Birlinn.
- Donaldson, Gordon (1983). "The Scots settlement in Shetland". In Withrington, Donald J. (ed.). Shetland and the Outside World 1429–1969. Oxford: Oxford University Press. pp. 8–19.
- Edmondston, Thomas (1866). An etymological glossary of the Shetland and Orkney dialect. London: Asher.
- Elliards, Xander (5 October 2022). "'Ground-breaking' language plan paves way for Scots to flourish in Shetland". The National.
- Faraclas, Nicholas (2021). "Identity politics". In Ansaldo, Umberto; Meyerhoff, Miriam (eds.). The Routledge Handbook of Pidgin and Creole Languages. London: Routledge. pp. 269–285.
- Fraser, Allen (2024). "Did the Fimbulwinter eradicate Shetland's Picts?" (PDF). Journal of the Scottish Society for Northern Studies. 54: 1–30.
- Friedland, Klaus (1983). "Hanseatic merchants and their trade". In Withrington, Donald J. (ed.). Shetland & the Outside World 1469–1969. Oxford: Oxford University Press.
- Gott, Tony, ed. (26 January 2016). "Janet Manson". North Isles Family History (bayanne.info/Shetland). I50709.
- Gott, Tony, ed. (26 December 2016). "Jane Ratter". North Isles Family History (bayanne.info/Shetland). I62002.
- Gott, Tony, ed. (21 November 2021). "Walter Sutherland". North Isles Family History (bayanne.info/Shetland). I48645.
- Graham, John James (1993). The Shetland dictionary (3rd ed.). Lerwick: Shetland Times. ISBN 0-900662-93-X.
- Grant, Anthony P. (2019). "Contact-induced linguistic change. An introduction". In Grant, Anthony P. (ed.). The Oxford handbook of language contact. Oxford University Press. pp. 1–50. ISBN 978-0-19-994509-2.
- Grant, Anthony (19 August 2025). "Contact-Induced Linguistic Change". Oxford Research Encyclopedia of Linguistics. doi:10.1093/acrefore/9780199384655.013.1120. ISBN 978-0-19-938465-5.
- Grant, William; Dixon, James Main (1921). Manual of Modern Scots. Cambridge: Cambridge University Press.
- Helle, Knut (2019). "Bergen's role in the medieval North Atlantic trade". AmS-Skrifter. 27: 43–51.
- Holterman, Bart (2020). The Fish Lands: German Trade with Iceland, Shetland and the Faroe Islands in the Late 15th and 16th Century. Berlin: De Gruyter.
- Inkster, James (1922). Mansie's röd: sketches in the Shetlandic [Mansie's rambling] (in Shetlandic). Lerwick: T. & J. Manson.
- Iversen, Ragnvald (1994). Norrøn grammatikk [Norse grammar] (in Norwegian) (7th revised ed.). Oslo: Tano.
- Jakobsen, Jakob (1908). Etymologisk ordbog over det norrøne sprog på Shetland [An etymological dictionary of the Norn Language in Shetland] (in Danish). København: Vilhelm Prior.
- Jakobsen, Jakob (1928) [1921]. An etymological dictionary of the Norn language in Shetland. Printed by S. L. Møller, Copenhagen. Foreword by Anna Horsböl, née Jakobsen. Originally published in Danish as Etymologisk ordbog over det norröne sprog på Shetland. Reprinted Lerwick: The Shetland Folk Society, 1985. (1st ed.). Shaftesbury Avenue, London: David Nutt (A. G. Berry) – via the Internet Archive.
- Johnston, Paul (1997). "Regional Variation". In Jones, Charles (ed.). The Edinburgh History of the Scots Language. Edinburgh: Edinburgh University Press. doi:10.1515/9781474469630. ISBN 1-4744-6963-9.
- Joshi, Suhani (27 July 2026). "Scottish Funding Council steps in to collect Shaetlan language data, marking a major milestone". The Shetland Times.
- Karam, Kerry (2017). Knappin: Standard versus dialect speech modification in Shetland (Doctorate thesis). University of Aberdeen.
- Knooihuizen, Remco (2005). "The Norn-to-Scots language shift: another look at socio-historical evidence". Northern Studies. 39: 105–117. hdl:11370/e88366e5-6a56-4e0c-9e3f-33cb72e213bc.
- Knooihuizen, Remco (2009). Minority languages between reformation and revolution: Approaches to historical sociolinguistics on the plurilingual margins or early modern Europe (PhD thesis). Edinburgh: University of Edinburgh.
- Laurenson, Arthur (1860). "Om sproget paa Shetlandsöerne" [About the language on the Shetland Islands]. Annaler for Nordisk Oldkyndighed og Historie (in Danish): 190–201.
- Ljosland, Ragnhild (2012). "The establishment of the Scots language in Orkney". The New Orkney Antiquarian Journal. 6. Kirkwall: Orkney Heritage Society: 65–80.
- Ljosland, Ragnhild (2025). "Giving voice to the victims of the Orkney witchcraft trials: 'Answered, she spoke it for weakness of her owne flesh, and for feare of her lyfe'". In Faraclas, Nicholas; Storch, Anne; Velupillai, Viveka (eds.). Hospitable Linguistics. London: Bloomsbury. pp. 304–310.
- Lyngby, Kristen Jensen (1860). "Om sproget på Hjaltlandsøerne" [About the language on the Shetland Islands]. Annaler for Nordisk Oldkyndighed og Historie (in Danish): 201–216.
- MacDonald, Aidan D. S. (2002). "The papar and some problems: a brief review". In Crawford, Barbara (ed.). The Papar in the North Atlantic: environment and history. St Andrews: Committee for Dark Age Studies, University of St Andrews. pp. 13–30.
- Marter, Hans J. (4 August 2025). "Call to get Shaetlan included in the next Scottish census". Shetland News.
- Marter, Hans J. (15 October 2025). "Shaetlan receives full recognition as a language". Shetland News.
- McColl Millar, Robert (2007). Northern and insular Scots. Edinburgh: Edinburgh University Press. ISBN 978-0-7486-2316-7.
- McColl Millar, Robert (2008). "The origins and development of Shetland dialect in light of dialect contact theories". English World-Wide. 29 (3): 237–267. doi:10.1075/eww.29.3.02mil.
- McColl Millar, Robert (2018). Modern Scots. An Analytical Survey. Edinburgh: Edinburgh University Press.
- Matras, Yaron; Bakker, Peter (2003). "Mixed languages: Re-examining the structural prototype". In Matras, Yaron; Bakker, Peter (eds.). The Mixed Language Debate. Berlin: De Gruyter Mouton. pp. 151–176. doi:10.1515/9783110197242.151. ISBN 3-11-017776-5.
- Meakins, Felicity (2013). Bakker, Peter; Matras, Yaron (eds.). "Mixed Languages". Contact Languages. A Comprehensive Guide. Berlin: De Gruyter Mouton: 159–228. doi:10.1515/9781614513711.159. ISBN 978-1-61451-476-3.
- Mehler, Natascha; Gardiner, Mark (2013). Pope, Peter E.; Lewis-Simpson, Shannon (eds.). "On the verge of colonialism: English and Hanseatic trade in the North Atlantic Islands". Exploring Atlantic Transitions. Archaeologies of Transience and Permanence in New Found Lands. Woodbridge: The Boydell press: 1–15.
- Melchers, Gunnel (1991). "Norn-Scots: a complicated language contact situation in Shetland". In Ureland, Per Sture; Broderick, George (eds.). Language Contact in the British Isles: Proceedings of the Eighth International Symposium on Language Contact in Europe, Douglas, Isle of Man, 1988. Berlin, New York: Max Niemeyer Verlag. p. 468. doi:10.1515/9783111678658. ISBN 3-484-30238-0.
- Melchers, Gunnel (2004a). Kortmann, Bernd; Schneider, Edgar W.; Burridge, Kate; Mesthrie, Rajend; Upton, Clive (eds.). "English spoken in Orkney and Shetland: phonology". A Handbook of Varieties of English. 1 Phonology. Berlin: Mouton de Gruyter: 35–46.
- Melchers, Gunnel (2004b). Kortmann, Bernd; Schneider, Edgar W.; Burridge, Kate; Mesthrie, Rajend; Upton, Clive (eds.). "English spoken in Orkney and Shetland: morphology, syntax and lexicon". A Handbook of Varieties of English. 2 Morphology and syntax. Berlin: Mouton de Gruyter: 34–47.
- Melchers, Gunnel (2010). "'This unique dialect': The profile of Shetland dialect in a typology of world Englishes". Scottish Language. 29: 37–52.
- Melchers, Gunnel; Sundqvist, Peter (2010). Schreier, Daniel; Trudgill, Peter; Schneider, Edgar; Williams, Jeffrey (eds.). "Shetland and Orkney". The Lesser-known Varieties of English. Cambridge: Cambridge University Press: 17–34. doi:10.1017/CBO9780511676529.003.
- Michaelis, Susanne Maria; Maurer, Philippe; Haspelmath, Martin; Huber, Magnus, eds. (2013). "APiCS Online". The Atlas of Pidgin and Creole Language Structures Online.
- Muysken, Pieter (14 December 2000). Bilingual Speech: A Typology of Code-Mixing. Cambridge University Press. ISBN 0-521-77168-4.
- Myers-Scotton, Carol (2003). Matras, Yaron; Bakker, Peter (eds.). "What lies beneath. Split (mixed) languages as contact phenomena". The Mixed Language Debate. Theoretical and Empirical Advances. Berlin: De Gruyter Mouton: 73–106. doi:10.1515/9783110197242.73. ISBN 3-11-017776-5.
- Nedkvitne, Arnved (2014). The German Hansa and Bergen 1100–1600. Köln: Böhlau Verlag.
- Nicolson, Ryan (21 August 2025). "Swinney 'dumbfounded' that NorthLink passengers cannot book for 2026". Shetland News.
- Noble, Gordon; Evans, Nicholas (2022). Picts. Scourge of Rome, rulers of the north. Edinburgh: John Donald.
- Orknojarlarnas saga [Orkneyinga Saga] (in Swedish). Translated by Fries, Ingegerd. Hedemora: Gidlunds Forlag. 2006.
- Renwick, Jack (1963). Rainbow bridge. (A collection of poems in English & Shetlandic.) (in Shetlandic). Lerwick: Shetland Times.
- Renwick, Jack; Johnson, Heyddir; O'Neill, Liam (2007). The harp of twilight: an anthology of poems in English and Shetlandic. Unst: Unst Writers Group.
- Robertson, Thomas Alexander; Graham, John James (1952). Grammar and usage of the Shetland dialect. Lerwick: Shetland Times.
- Robertson, Thomas Alexander; Graham, John James (1991). Grammar and usage of the Shetland dialect (2nd ed.). Lerwick: Shetland Times. ISBN 0-900662-78-6.
- Ross, David (1893). "Place-names and dialect of Shetland". Proceedings of the Philosophical Society of Glasgow. Glasgow: John Smith & Son: 108–118.
- Scott, John W. (2017). Orkney and Shetland weather words. A comparative dictionary. Shetland Times.
- Sibbald, Sir Robert (1845). The Description of the Isles of Orkney and Zetland. Edinburgh: Andrew Symson.
- Shetland ForWirds (9 June 2014). Mirds o wirds: a Shetland dialect word book. Shetland Times. ISBN 978-1-904746-91-1.
- Smith, Brian (2013a). "Wadmal". In Laurenson, Sarah (ed.). Shetland Textiles. 800 BC to the Present. Lerwick: Shetland Heritage Publications. pp. 44–48.
- Smith, Brian (2013b). "Stockings and mittens, 1580–1851". In Laurenson, Sarah (ed.). Shetland Textiles. 800 BC to the Present. Lerwick: Shetland Heritage Publications. pp. 52–58.
- Smith, Norval; Grant, Anthony P. (2019). Grant, Anthony P. (ed.). "Mixed languages, younger languages, and contact-induced linguistic change". The Oxford Handbook of Language Contact. Oxford: Oxford University Press: 303–327.
- Tait, John M. (1988). Graham, John J. (ed.). "Da sermon apo da brae pairt I (Matthew ch.5) (pitten intae Shaetlan)" [The sermon on the mount part I (Matthew ch.5) (translated into Shaetlan)]. The New Shetlander (in Shetlandic). No. 166. p. 8.
- Thomason, Sarah Grey; Kaufman, Terrence (1988). Language contact, creolization and genetic linguistics. Berkeley: University of California Press.
- Thomason, Sarah Grey (2001). Language contact. An introduction. Edinburgh: Edinburgh University Press.
- van Leyden, Klaske (2004). Prosodic characteristics of Orkney and Shetland dialects: an experimental approach. Utrecht: Lot. ISBN 90-76864-57-8.
- Velupillai, Viveka (2015). Pidgins, creoles and mixed languages. An introduction. Amsterdam and Philadelphia: John Benjamins. ISBN 978-90-272-5271-5.
- Velupillai, Viveka (24 September 2019). "Gendered inanimates in Shetland dialect. Comparing pre-oil and contemporary speech". English World-Wide. 40 (3). John Benjamins Publishing Company: 269–298. doi:10.1075/eww.00032.vel. eISSN 1569-9730. ISSN 0172-8865.
- Velupillai, Viveka (2 April 2021). The power of digitalk: How social media registers can give a written voice to stigmatized varieties. Stylistics, Critical Discourse Analysis, and Language Use in the Caribbean. University of Trinidad & Tobago.
- Velupillai, Viveka (2025). "Language preservation in strangely familiar places: How traditional skills have helped preserve Shaetlan". In Aikhenvald, A. Y.; Storch, A.; Velupillai, V. (eds.). Language in strange and familiar places. Linguistic research in uncharted territories. Anthropological Linguistics. De Gruyter Mouton. pp. 39–73.
- Velupillai, Viveka; Mullay, Roy (15 May 2025). Shaetlan: a young language wi aald røts [Shaetlan: a young language with old roots] (in Shetlandic). With contributions by Hazel Adamson, Helen A. Balfour, Ronnie Eunson, John Goodlad, Bobby Hunter, Alison Rendall & Claire White (1st ed.). Uradale: Kalafine-Skrits. ISBN 978-1-06-845730-2. OCLC 1524191734.
- Wainwright, Frederick T. (1962a). "The Scandinavian settlement". In Wainwright, Frederick T. (ed.). The Northern Isles. Edinburgh: Thomas Nelson and Sons. pp. 117–162.
- Wainwright, Frederick T. (1962b). "Picts and Scots". In Wainwright, Frederick T. (ed.). The Northern Isles. Edinburgh: Thomas Nelson and Sons. pp. 91–116.
- Walterson, Vaila (2020). An exploratory study of Shetland dialect on Instagram (BA thesis). University of Stirling.
- "639 Identifier Documentation: scz". SIL.org. 15 October 2025.
- "Aye Can - Scottish Census 2022 - Scots Language Question". Aye Can - Scottish Census 2022 - Scots Language Question.
- "Du, doo". Dictionary of the Scots Language.
- "Fishing protest march, port performance, language project, swimming club anniversary". Shetland News. 27 September 2022.
- "Language vs dialect". I Hear Dee. 5 January 2022.
- "Recollections o' da past". The Shetland Times (in Shetlandic). 20 November 1880. p. 3 – via the British Newspaper Archive.
- "Spelling in Shaetlan". I Hear Dee.
