= List of Lerwick Up Helly Aa Guizer Jarls =

The Lerwick Up Helly Aa is the largest Up Helly Aa fire festival celebrated annually on the last Tuesday in January in Lerwick, the capital of Shetland, Scotland. A Guizer Jarl has featured in each Lerwick Up Helly Aa since the introduction of the position in 1906. The Guizer Jarl is the chief guizer, who (in the modern festival) leads a squad dressed as Vikings who are the primary focus of the festival's proceedings. Only the Jarl's Squad dresses as Vikings; the festival's other squads dress up in other costumes associated with the act they perform throughout the halls opened after the torchlight procession.

It took until after the First World War until a squad of Vikings appeared in the festival every year. As the festival developed, each Guizer Jarl would select a name for the galley, which is constructed from October the previous year and burned at the culmination of the torchlight procession. Later again, the Guizer Jarl began to portray specific individuals from the sagas, or the history of Shetland, and began to select a tune to be played by the Lerwick Brass Band as the Jarl leads his squad up the ranks of guizers just prior to the torchlight procession.

Those wishing to become Guizer Jarl must be elected to the Lerwick Up Helly Aa Committee (elections are held during mass meetings which all squads' members can attend), and then serve the committee for 15 years. Traditionally, women and girls were not permitted in any Lerwick squad, and as such were not able to become Guizer Jarl, however in 2022 the Lerwick Up Helly Aa Committee lifted this restriction for future festivals, and the first female members in the Lerwick Jarl's Squad featured in 2024. While female guizers are permitted to varying degrees in the other Up Helly Aa festivals in Shetland, three Up Helly Aas have had female Guizer Jarls: Angela Tait (now Leask), being the first female Jarl at the 1988 Walls Junior Up Helly Aa organised by the Brownies; Lesley Simpson, who became the first adult female Jarl at the 2015 South Mainland Up Helly Aa, and Alice Jamieson became the first female Guizer Jarl in 2025 for Cullivoe.

== List of Lerwick UHA Guizer Jarls ==
Year	Guizer Jarl	Portraying	Galley Name	Ranks Tune	Reference
1906	J. W. Robertson				
1907	H. J. Anderson				
1908	W. Sinclair				
1909	Jas. Laing				
1910	G. T. Anderson				
1911	E. S. Reid Tait				
1912	E. S. Reid Tait (for H. Kay)				
1913	McG. Scott		Thor		
1914	Laurence Sandison		Aegers Hest		
1915	Not held due to First World War				
1916	Not held due to First World War				
1917	Not held due to First World War				
1918	Not held due to First World War				
1919	Not held due to First World War				
1920	Bertie Robertson				
1921	A. P. Hawick	Vikings	Haco		
1922	George H. Burgess	Balder	Sigr		
1923	John Campbell	Frey	Njord		
1924	Charles A. Petrie	Heimdall	Gerda		
1925	Laurence Gray	Njord	Maurildi		
1926	Charles A. Manson	Helgeland Vikings	Hvitabjörn		
1927	James McIntosh	Olaf Tryggveson	Ormr		
1928	Robert A. Johnson	Ullr	Vegr		
1929	P. Bruce Laurenson	Vikings	Vali		
1930	P. S. Goodlad	Jom Vikings	Fraegth		
1931	J. W. Irvine	Jorsalafarers	Idun		
1932	Peter Moar	Vikings	Friðr		
1933	A. R. M. Mathewson	Frithiof	Ellida		
1934	Tom Henry	King Sverre's Birkbeiners	Hugro		
1935	John Gear	Vikings	Sæ-Orn		
1936	J. W. P. Angus	Varanger Guard	Beykisudin		
1937	Robert Gray	Leif Erikson	Odur		
1938	James Anderson	Hjaltlanders	Jola-Tungl		
1939	Gilbert Halcrow	Erik the Red	Visund		
1940	Not held due to Second World War				
1941	Not held due to Second World War				
1942	Not held due to Second World War				
1943	Not held due to Second World War				
1944	Not held due to Second World War				
1945	Not held due to Second World War				
1946	Not held due to Second World War				
1947	Not held due to Second World War				
1948	Not held due to Second World War				
1949	L. L. Johnson	Jarl Rognvald Kolson	Hjolp		
1950	G. W. Blance	Torf-Einarr	Möre		
1951	J. W. Hunter	Sverre	Mariasud		
1952	J. P. Smith	Jarl Ragnvald Môre	Sundmöre		
1953	A. B. Williamson	Eyskeggs	Eyskegg		
1954	L. T. Thomason	Hakon Hakonsson	Kross-Suthin		
1955	J. M. McIntosh	Thorfin Karlsefni	Gudrid		
1956	J. P. Moar	King Harald Harfagr	Gyda		
1957	A. G. Johnston	Haakon the Jarl	Thora		
1958	G. A. W. Manson	Jarl Erik Haakonsson	Jernskjegg		
1959	Jack Scott	King Magnus Barelegs	Hok		
1960	William L. Tait	Olaf the Saint	Visund		
1961	James Young	Harald Hardrada's Vaerings	Væring		
1962	G. W. Leask	Olaf Kyrre	Olaf Kyrre		
1963	G. A. B. Paton	Sigurd the Crusader	Jorsalfarer		
1964	J. G. Hunter	King Harald Graafeld	Harald Grafel	Our Director	
1965	Thomas Moncrieff	Ottar the Explorer	Loki	Our Director	
1966	Joe S. Hunter	Haakon the Good	Feeyarsund	Belphegor	
1967	Douglas C. Smith	Erling Skakki	Bökesunden	Stein Song	
1968	Thomas Simpson	Halfdan the Black	Viggyrdil (war girdle)	Scotland the Brave	
1969	A. T. H. Tulloch	Magnus the Lawmender	Lagaböter (lawmender)	Wark o' the Weavers	
1970	William Peterson	Einar Thambarskelver	Ormrinn Langi (long serpent)	Our Director	
1971	Allan Anderson	Tore the Hound	Ulvin (wolf)	Imperial Echoes	
1972	John L. Laurenson	Bonder	Gula Ting Skib	Erimus	
1973	Robert Geddes	Floki of the Ravens	Geirhilda	Standard of St George	
1974	James Kerr	Magnus the Good	Bison	Saints	
1975	Maurice Manson	Earl Thorfinn the Mighty	Bifrost	Rasmus	
1976	John Johnston	Kali Kolsson	Fifa (arrow)	Under the Double Eagle	
1977	George Hunter	Sigmund Brestisson of Faroe	Skuda	Radetsky	
1978	Peter Leith	Bjorn of Mousa	Thora	Mangaster Voe	
1979	J. J. Nicolson	Egil Scallagrimsson	Kveldulf (night wolf)	Slantigart	
1980	D. G. Leslie	Jan Bjornejegeren	Vår (spring)	B/M Burgoyne	
1981	Harry Jamieson	Thorvald Thoreson	Virda	Blaze Away	
1982	Kenneth Crossan	Hakon's Fakkelbaere	Ormen (serpent)	Gerty Boys	
1983	James Burgess	Kári Solmundarson	Njord (god of wealth, sea & fire)	Fraternity	
1984	Peter Malcolmson	Eirik Bloodaxe Haraldson	Bokies	Blayden Races	
1985	John Ratter	Thorvald Inflyterre	Laks	Aces High	
1986	Gordon Stronach	Sigurd's Crusaders	Nordlys (northern lights)	Sigurd's March	
1987	Magnus Simpson	Ragnar Lodbrok	Sungam	Brown Girl	
1988	Charles Simpson	Thorbjorn Clerk	Ravnur	Holyrood	
1989	Willie Black	Halfdan of Brouster	Jaruin	Black Bear	
1990	John Mathewson	Svein Asleifarson	Gareksey	Colonel Bogey	
1991	Andrew Johnston	Thorstein Olafsson	Sjøormen	Anchors Aweigh	
1992	Laurence Moncrieff	Magnus Erlendsson	Shoormal	Valdres March	
1993	Ronald Gair	Earl Rognvald Brusason	Vagsoy	Roll Out the Barrel	
1994	Charles W. Grant	Goturm the Dane	Drakker	Old Comrades	
1995	Peter R. Leask	Jon Petersson of Sogn	Alasund	Vienna Remains Vienna	
1996	Jim Coutts	Brúsi Sigurdsson	Vågar	The Happy Wanderer	
1997	Willie Smith	Sigurd Magnusson	Garvor	Gammel Jegermarsj	
1998	Colin Summers	Thorbjorn of Wast Burrafirt	Lori Tafgen	Jarl Summers Time	
1999	Davie Mathewson	Sigurd Hlodvisson	Ásmundarvag	Liberty Bell	
2000	Billy Goudie	Harald Maddadsson	Hvit Lyn	British Legion	
2001	Michael Groat	Gunnar Hamundarson	Old Faithful	Blaze Away	
2002	Bruce Leask	Harald Gilli Magnusson	Vestmaenir	Highland Laddie	
2003	Alex Johnson	Olaf Sitricson	Aaksytrik	Wilds o' Yell	
2004	Stanley Manson	Naddod of Faroe	Bergholm	Show Business	
2005	Peter Fraser	Earl Sigurd o' Gord	Pete's Dragon	Teddy Bears' Picnic	
2006	Mark Manson	Einar of Gullberuvik	Moogi	Blues on the March	
2007	Graham Nicolson	Gunnar Egilsson	Jupiter	Blaze Away	
2008	Roy Leask	Kol Kalison	Breckon	Dambusters March	
2009	Stephen Mouat	Othere Fra Hålogaland	Is Bjørn	The Great Escape	
2010	Rae Simpson	Sigurd "Snake-Eye" Ragnarsson	Avie-Jane	Killiecrankie	
2011	John Hunter	Johan Sanderrevet of Valsgärde	Jägare	The Regiment	
2012	David Nicolson	Böthvar Egilsson	Per Ardua	The A-Team	
2013	Stephen Grant	Gamle Eriksson	Krisara	On the Quarterdeck	
2014	Ivor Cluness	Ivar (The Boneless) Ragnarsson	Congo Warrior	Raiders March	
2015	Neil Robertson	Olav Harldsson	Nils Olav	Out of the Blue	
2016	Mark Evans	Solmund Sigurdsson of Tønsberg	Lauren Grace	Pride of Princess Street	
2017	Lyall Gair	Sweyn "Forkbeard" Haraldsson	Falcon	Gonna Fly Now	
2018	Stewart Jamieson	Thorvald Thorvaldsson	Blaze Away	Old Comrades	
2019	John Nicolson	Thorstein Egilsson	Chloe Barbara	The Magnificent Seven	
2020	Liam Summers	Odin - Lord of the Gallows	Yggdrasil	Erimus	
2021	Postponed due to the COVID-19 pandemic				
2022	Postponed due to the COVID-19 pandemic				
2023	Neil Moncrieff	Njal Thorgeirsson	Petingaer	The Middy	
2024	Richard Moar	Harald Olafsson	Ethena	Gerty Boys	
2025	Calum Grains	Eystein Magnusson	Byssen	Anchors Aweigh	
2026	Lynden Nicolson	Knut the Great	Skyldulíð		
2027	Ryan Leith				
2028	Brydon Wright				
2029	Graeme Garrick				
2030	Robert Geddes				
2031	Neil Fraser				
2032	Brydon Gray				
2033	Gary Smith				
2034	James Leask				
2035	Jon Pulley				
2036	Jordan Hunter				
2037	Shane Jamieson				
2038	Scot Goudie				
2039	John Gair				
2040	Stuart Nicolson				
2041	Liam Evans				

== Sources ==
- "Coronavirus: Shetland's Up Helly Aa fire festival called off for 2021". BBC News. 1 July 2020.
- Cope, Chris (22 June 2022). "Women and girls allowed: gender restriction removed on Lerwick Up Helly Aa squads". Shetland News.
- Cope, Chris (30 January 2024a). "Big day for Richard and family as Up Helly Aa takes to the streets of Lerwick". Shetland News.
- Cope, Chris (30 October 2024b). "Gair 'delighted' to become latest Up Helly Aa committee member". Shetland News.
- Cope, Chris (27 February 2025). "Cullivoe Up Helly Aa's first female jarl leads festivities in Yell". Shetland News.
- Murrie, Ewan (29 August 2018). "Gender row over Viking fire festival".
- Nicolson, Ryan (22 June 2022). "Lerwick Up-Helly-A' to allow women in squads for first time". The Shetland Times.
- Robertson, Marjolein (29 March 2018). "Angela Leask on Waas' Up Helly Aa". The Shetland Times Podcast (Podcast). The Shetland Times. Event occurs at 01:35.
- Ruck, Joanna; Hecimovic, Arnel (31 January 2017). "Up Helly Aa festival in Shetland – in pictures". The Guardian. ISSN 0261-3077.
- "Female Viking makes Shetland history". 13 March 2015.
- "Former Jarls". Up Helly Aa.
- "Lerwick Up Helly Aa". Shetland.org.
- "Lerwick Up Helly Aa postponed to 2023". Shetland News. 13 August 2021.
- "Shane wins seat on committee as Up Helly Aa gets ready for next year's festival". Shetland News. 26 October 2022.
- "Walls Junior Up Helly Aa". Shetland.org.
- Up Helly A' Official Programme 2020. Lerwick: The Shetland Times. 28 January 2020. pp. 9–11.
- Up Helly A' Official Programme 2024. Lerwick: The Shetland Times. 30 January 2024. pp. 5, 13. ISBN 9781904746539.
- Up Helly A' Official Programme 2025. Lerwick: The Shetland Times. 28 January 2025. pp. 5, 13. ISBN 9781904746539.
- "Up Helly Aa to allow females in fire festival squads". BBC News. 22 June 2022.
