= Apologetic apostrophe =

Modern Scots orthography

The 'apologetic' or parochial apostrophe is the distinctive use of apostrophes in some Modern Scots spelling. Apologetic apostrophes generally occurred where a consonant exists in the Standard English cognate, as in a' (all), gi'e (give) and wi' (with).

The practice, unknown in Older Scots, was introduced in the 18th century by writers such as Allan Ramsay, Robert Fergusson and Robert Burns as part of a process of Anglicisation. The 18th-century practice was also adopted by later writers such as Walter Scott, John Galt and Robert Louis Stevenson. It produced an easily understood spurious Scots that was very popular with English readers and on the English stage. It was also sometimes forced on reluctant authors by publishers desirous of a wider circulation for their books.

The custom "also had the unfortunate effect of suggesting that Broad Scots was not a separate language system, but rather a divergent or inferior form of English". The use of the apologetic apostrophe has become less widespread since the appearance of the 'Style Sheet' in 1947.

== L-vocalisation ==
Early Scots had undergone a process of L-vocalisation where /l/ was preceded by the vowels /a/ and /u̞/ in closed syllables, which was completed by the end of the 14th century. The cluster /al/ vocalised to /aː/ and /u̞l/ to /uː/ hence spellings such as a' (all), ba' (ball), ca' (call), sa't (salt) and ha'd (hold), and fu' and pu' with the doublets full [fʌl] and pull [pʌl]. The standard literary apostrophe-less spellings for /aː/ (also /ɑː, ɔː/) were ⟨au⟩ and ⟨aw⟩ with ⟨au⟩ generally occurring word initially or medially, and ⟨aw⟩ occurring word final thus aw (all), baw (ball), caw (call), saut (salt) and haud (hold).

The standard literary spelling of /uː/ was ⟨ou⟩, generally preferred in the Scottish National Dictionary, although the use of ⟨oo⟩, borrowed from Standard English, became popular by the 19th century. Thus fou and pou, but the form fu functioning as the cognate of the suffix 'ful'. L also vocalised after /o̞/ in closed syllables resulting in a diphthong which became /ʌu/ in Modern Scots, for example knowe (knoll), fowk (folk), gowf (golf) and gowd (gold).

== Inflectional endings ==
The consonant clusters in the inflectional endings ⟨ing⟩ and ⟨and⟩, cognate with Standard English ⟨ing⟩, changed to /n/ in Early Scots: the modern realisations generally being /ɪn/ and /ən/ hence the spelling in'.

== Consonant clusters ==
The cluster ⟨mb⟩ had been reduced to /m/ in Early Scots hence spelling such as num'er (number), cham'er (chamber) and tim'er (timber), the standard literary apostrophe-less spellings being nummer, chaumer and timmer.

The cluster ⟨nd⟩ is reduced to /n/ in some Scots dialects hence spellings such as caun'le (candle), haun' (hand) and staun' (stand) though the ⟨d⟩ is generally written in the literary standard, thus caundle, haund and staund.

The cluster ⟨ld⟩ is also reduced to /l/ in some Scots dialects, hence spellings such as aul' (old), caul' (cold) and faul' (fold) though the ⟨d⟩ is generally written in the literary standard, thus auld, cauld and fauld.

== Loss of consonants ==
By the Middle Scots period, /f/ and /v/ deletion had occurred intervocalically and between a nasal/liquid consonant and a vowel. Hence spellings such as de'il (devil), gi'e (give), ha'e (have), lo'e (love), o' (of), o'er (over) and sil'er (silver), the standard literary apostrophe-less spellings being deil, gie, hae, lue, o, ower and siller.

Also by that period, word-final /θ/ had been lost in a number of words. Hence spellings such as fro' (froth), quo' (quoth), wi' (with) and mou' (mouth), the standard literary apostrophe-less spellings being fro, quo, wi and mou, the latter having the doublet mooth.

== Change of vowel ==
In some Scots words the realisation differs from that of the Standard English cognate; hence spellings such as bak' (bake), mak' (make) and tak' (take), the standard literary apostrophe-less spellings being bak, mak and tak.

== Legitimate use of the apostrophe in Scots ==
Many words in Scots have both a full form and a contracted form. In contracted forms, an apostrophe is generally used in place of the elided graphemes, for example, e'en and even, e'er and iver (ever), eneu' and eneuch (enough), lea' and leave, ne'er and niver (never), ne'er's day and new year's day, nor'land and northland.

In the construction of the past tense or past participle, Scots often appends the apostrophe to verbs ending with ee to prevent three es from occurring in a single word:

- dee (die) > dee'd
- gree (agree) > gree'd

Scots also uses, as does English, the apostrophe to indicate contractions of multiple words: A'm (I'm), wi't (with it), ye're (you're), o't (of it).
