= William the Old =

William the Old (Latin: Gulielmus Senex; died 1168) was a 12th-century prelate who became one of the most famous bishops of Orkney. Although his origins are obscure in detail, William was said to have been a "clerk of Paris", which Barbara E. Crawford interprets as meaning that he had received his theological training in northern France. Saga tradition had it that William had been bishop for 66 years when he died in 1168, meaning that his accession to the bishopric would have been around 1102. There is no contemporary evidence of his episcopate until a letter of Pope Honorius II in 1128, which even then does not name William specifically, but rather only mentions a bishop holding office at the same time as Radulf Novell. He was however definitively in charge by December 1135 during the earldom of Earl Paul Haakonsson.

Bishop William was a promoter of the cult of St Magnus, and was allegedly witness to some posthumous miraculous activity of the former earl. William had St Magnus' relics transferred to Kirkwall, fixing the episcopal seat at this location and, with the assistance of Earl Rognvald Kali Kolsson, constructing a new cathedral there. It was probably for these reasons that William was remembered in later Orcadian tradition, saga and ecclesiastical, as the founding bishop of Orkney. Along with Earl Rognvald, between 1151 and 1153 William went on pilgrimage to the Holy Land. In 1153/4 the bishopric of Orkney came firmly into the Scandinavian fold, as opposed to the York or St Andrews fold, when the Papal legate Nicholas Breakspear arrived in Norway to create a new Archbishopric of Trondheim (Niðaros) embracing the Orcadian see.

== Notes ==
Religious titles
Preceded by Radulf Novell	Bishop of Orkney; 1102 x 1135–1168	Succeeded by William (II)
