= History of Orkney =

Humans have inhabited Orkney, an archipelago in the north of Scotland, for about 8,800 years: Archeological evidence dates from Mesolithic times. Scandinavian clans dominated the area from the 8th century CE, using the islands as a base for further incursions. In the late 15th century the archipelago became part of Scotland.

== Prehistoric Orkney ==
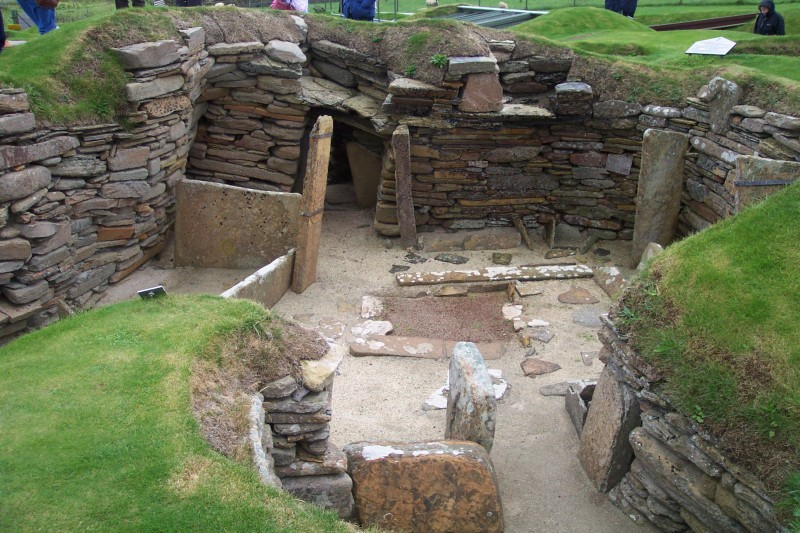
Neolithic dwellings at Skara Brae, Orkney

As with Prehistoric Scotland generally, hunter gatherers followed the slow retreat of ice age glaciation. The rapid spread of Neolithic culture up the western seaways soon brought early farming settlements and Megalithic culture. The prevalent use of the local sandstone, found ready split into convenient building slabs on the shore, preserved numerous structures from this period, including prehistoric villages, brochs, souterrain structures, chambered cairns and standing stones.

The oldest stone house still standing in northern Europe (occupied from 3500 BC to 3100 BC) is at Knap of Howar on the island of Papa Westray, with walls intact to a low eaves height, and stone furniture looking very usable. Finely made and decorated Unstan ware pottery links the inhabitants to chambered cairn tombs nearby. At Skara Brae on the Mainland, passageways connect similar houses into a village, dating from about 3000 BC to 2500 BC. Pottery found here is of the grooved ware style which was found at the Standing Stones of Stenness, close to the exceptional Maeshowe passage grave type chambered cairn of about the same period.

The nearby Ring of Brodgar circle of standing stones was one of the first to be analysed by Professor Alexander Thom to establish the likely use of standing stones as astronomical observatories. Another Neolithic village has been found in the vicinity at Barnhouse Settlement.

The brochs of Orkney occur on several islands. Many of these structures, such as Burroughston Broch on Shapinsay, are isolated fortified houses. Others, such as the Broch of Gurness, are surrounded by numerous other dwellings and ancillary structures. In many cases the brochs also are surrounded by elaborate ditch and rampart defences. Both Burroughston Broch and the Broch of Gurness have interesting guard chambers within their thick drystone walls to monitor the single entrance passages.

== Iron Age ==
The Iron Age brought impressive "Brochs" or round towers, and "weems" or underground houses. Such implements as have survived are primitive, and include quern-stones (for grinding grain), stone whorls and bone combs used in primitive forms of weaving, and specimens of simple pottery ware. Little is known of the culture and language of the early inhabitants. Only two languages are found in pre-Norse Orkney, Old Gaelic (Old Irish) and Latin.

The Romans were aware of (and probably circumnavigated) the Orkney Islands, which they called "Orcades", thought to be a Brythonic Celtic name. A "king of the Orcades" was one of the 11 rulers said to have paid tribute to Claudius following his invasion of Britain in AD 43. Indeed 4th and 5th century sources include the Islands in a Roman province. Archaeological evidence suggests that the Romans only traded with the inhabitants, perhaps through intermediaries; no signs of clear occupation have been found. But, according to scholars like Montesanti, "Orkney might have been one of those areas that suggest direct administration by Imperial Roman procurators, at least for a very short span of time".

== Early medieval period ==
The Picts regained power until dispossessed by the Norse in the 9th century, with the possible interruption of a short period towards the beginning of the 6th century, when Dál Riata Gaels may have established a footing in the islands, followed by Celtic missionaries in about 565. They were followers of Saint Columba, and their efforts to convert the folk to Christianity seem to have impressed the popular imagination, for the names of several islands include the epithet "Papa" in commemoration of the hermits.

== Norwegian rule ==
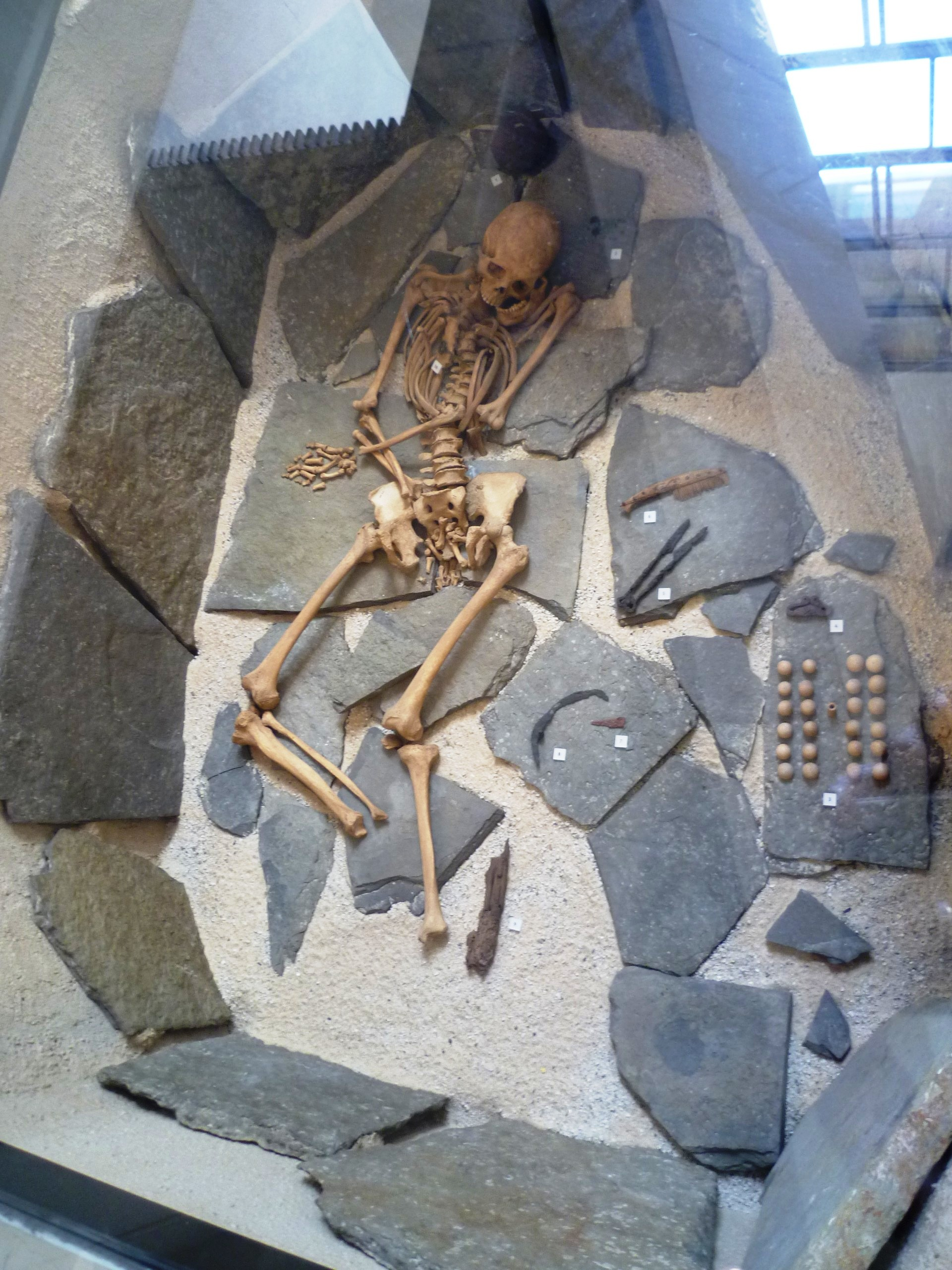
Viking grave from Orkney reconstructed in the National Museum of Scotland

Vikings having made the islands the headquarters of their aggressive expeditions (carried out indifferently against their own Norway and the coasts and isles of Scotland), Harold Hårfagre ("Fair Hair") subdued the rovers in 875 and annexed both Orkney and Shetland to Norway. They remained under the rule of Norwegian earls until 1231, when the line of the jarls became extinct. In that year the earldom of Caithness was granted to Magnus, second son of the Earl of Angus, whom the king of Norway apparently confirmed in the title. Recent studies from the field of population genetics reveal a significant percentage of Norse ethnic heritage—up to one third of the Y chromosomes on the islands are from western Norwegian ancestry, as opposed to Shetland, where over half the male lineage is of Norwegian stock.

Some jarls of Orkney:

- Ragnvald Eysteinsson, d. c. 890
- Turf-Einar, d. c. 910
- Thorfinn Turf-Einarsson, Earl of Orkney, d. c. 963
- Erlend II
- Hakon Paulsson, 1105–1123
- Saint Magnus, 1106–1117

There is a legend that Henry Sinclair, 1st Earl of Orkney may have sailed to Newfoundland in 1398, returning in 1400.

== Annexation by Scotland ==
In 1468 Orkney and Shetland were pledged by Christian I, in his capacity as king of Norway, for the payment of the dowry of his daughter Margaret, betrothed to James III of Scotland, and as the money was never paid, their connection with the crown of Scotland has been perpetual. In 1471 James bestowed the castle and lands of Ravenscraig in Fife on William, earl of Orkney, in exchange for all his rights to the earldom of Orkney, which, by act of parliament, passed on 20 February 1472, was annexed to the Scottish crown.

The last full-scale battle to take place on Orkney soil—the Battle of Summerdale—was fought in 1529, between the Sinclairs of Orkney and the Sinclairs of Caithness.

In 1564 Lord Robert Stewart, natural son of James V of Scotland, who had visited Kirkwall twenty-four years before, was made sheriff of Orkney and Shetland, and received possession of the estates of the udallers; in 1581 he was created earl of Orkney by James VI, the charter being ratified ten years later to his son Patrick, but after Patrick's execution in 1614 the earldom was again annexed to the crown.

The islands were the rendezvous of the Marquess of Montrose's expedition in 1650 which culminated in his imprisonment and death. Cromwell was last attacked by a foreign conquering force prior to the union of Scotland and England in 1650. During the Protectorate they were visited by a detachment of Oliver Cromwell's troops, who attacked various locations with his English Navy and the Roundhead Army. It is claimed by sympathetic writers that he initiated the inhabitants into various industrial arts and new methods of agriculture.

In 1707 the islands were granted to the earl of Morton in mortgage, redeemable by the Crown on payment of 30,000 pounds, and subject to an annual feu-duty of 500 pounds; but in 1766 his estates were sold to Sir Lawrence Dundas, ancestor of the Earls of Zetland.

== Religion ==
In early times, both the archbishop of Hamburg and the archbishop of York disputed with the Norwegians ecclesiastical jurisdiction over Orkney and the right of consecrating bishops; but ultimately the Norwegian bishops, the first of whom was William the Old (consecrated in 1102), continued the canonical succession. The see remained vacant from 1580 to 1606, and from 1638 till the Restoration, and, after the accession of William III, the episcopacy was finally abolished (1697), although many of the clergy refused to conform.

The Reformation took full hold on Orkney, except that whereas Norway became Lutheran, Orkney, like Shetland, became Presbyterian (Church of Scotland), as it was already under Scottish rule.

The topography of Orkney is wholly Norse, and the Norse tongue which evolved into the local Norn, at last extinguished by the constant influx of settlers from Scotland, lingered until the end of the 18th century. Readers of Scott's Pirate will remember the frank contempt which Magnus Troil expressed for the Scots, and his opinions probably accurately reflected the general Norse feeling on the subject. When the islands were given as security for the princess's dowry, there seems reason to believe that it was intended to redeem the pledge, because it was then stipulated that the Norse system of government and the law of Saint Olaf should continue to be observed in Orkney and Shetland. Thus the udal succession and mode of land tenure (that is, absolute freehold as distinguished from feudal tenure) lingered to some extent, and the remaining udallers held their lands and passed them on without written title.

== Twentieth century ==
The islands cluster round the huge deep-water anchorage of Scapa Flow like a protecting hand, and in both World War I and World War II, the Royal Navy had a major base there, enabling them to challenge any attempt by German warships to emerge into the ocean through the Norwegian Sea. After the Armistice in 1918, the German High Seas Fleet was transferred in its entirety to Scapa Flow while a decision was to be made on its future; however, the German sailors opened their sea-cocks and scuttled all the ships. Most ships were salvaged, but the remaining wrecks are now a favoured haunt of recreational divers.

== Second World War ==
One month into World War II, the Royal Navy battleship HMS Royal Oak was sunk by a German U-boat in Scapa Flow, with the loss of 835 lives. The Germans had found one small opening in the heavily defended bay. As a result, barriers were built, called "the Churchill Barriers," mostly completed by Italian prisoners of war, to close most of the access channels. These had the additional advantage of creating causeways whereby travellers can go from island to island by road instead of being obliged to rely on boats. In the course of the Second World War Italian prisoners of war were kept on Orkney Mainland; they improvised a chapel with elaborate architecture out of corrugated iron and other base materials, which is now a tourist attraction. The Scapa Flow base was closed in 1956.

== Recent years ==
In the 1960s and 1970s there were reports about the potential for uranium mining between Stromness and Yesnaby. Margaret Thatcher's plans to open such a mine were halted in 1980 after local campaigning, which included production of The Yellow Cake Revue by composer and conductor Peter Maxwell Davies, who lived on the neighbouring island of Hoy. The title refers to yellowcake, the powder produced in an early stage of the processing of uranium ore.

The Scottish independence referendum prompted some Orcadians to look for ways to recast the Constitutional status of Orkney.

In July 2023 the Orkney Council began moves to change its status, considering options such as becoming a British Crown dependency or a self-governing territory within the Kingdom of Norway..

== Archaeological discoveries ==
In September 2021, archaeologists announced the discovery of two polished stone balls in a 5500 years-old Neolithic burial tomb in Orkney in Sanday. According to Dr Hugo Anderson, the second object was the “size of a cricket ball, perfectly spherical and beautifully finished".

== Legend ==
In the Arthurian legend, Orkney is the home to King Lot, Sir Gareth, Sir Gaheris, Sir Gawaine, and Sir Agravain.
