= Radulf Novell =

Roman Catholic bishop of Orkney 1109-

Radulf Novell was a 12th-century Anglo-Norman prelate. He was a native of York, and according to writings produced by the Archbishopric of York, was elected as Bishop of Orkney at St Peter's church in York by some representatives of the community of Orkney.

It is probable that Radulf had the support of the faction supporting Earl Magnus Erlendsson. Thus when Earl Magnus was murdered in 1115 Radulf's position in Orkney, whatever that was, would have come under serious pressure. There are letters from Pope Calixtus II to Kings Sigurd Jorsalfare and Eystein in 1119 instructing them to ensure that Radulf could maintain peaceful possession. A further letter of 1128, from Pope Honorius II, reveals that Radulf's possession was tenuous. King Sigurd is instructed to remove an intruder to the see, and ensure there be one bishop only.

These letters correspond with the beginning of Radulf's continuous presence in England. Radulf was a staunch supporter of Archbishop Thurstan of York. Radulf was present at Thurstan's consecration at Rheims on 19 October 1119. It was probably Thurstan's support and Radulf's presence at Rheims that produced Pope Calixtus' letters. Radulf does not, however, seem to have been able to regain his position in Orkney from the Lund appointee William the Old.

Radulf became a titular bishop, propping up the suffragan numbers of the Archbishop of York, as well as being an assistant to the Archbishop and the Bishop of Durham. An English chronicler wrote that he found himself in this position because he was unacceptable to the people, clergy and earl of Orkney. A speech rallying the English against the Scottish host at the Battle of the Standard in 1138 was famously attributed to him by some Anglo-Norman chroniclers. His name occurs for the last time in 1151, though the date of his death is not known.

In some American genealogies, this Bishop of Orkney is referred to as "Robert Nowell" and "was bishop of the Orkneys, never consecrated, curate under Bishop of York, and friend of Archbishop Thurston; led the English armies at the battle of the Standard at Northallerton; signed himself Nowellus Episcopus; living in 1154."

Religious titles
Preceded by Roger	Bishop of Orkney; 1109 x 1114–1151x de facto Bishop; 1109 x 1128	Succeeded by William the Old
