= Middle Scots =

West Germanic language

- Scottis
- Region: Scottish Lowlands, to some extent the Northern Isles
- Era: Developed into Modern Scots by mid-18th century
- Language family: Indo-European: Germanic; West Germanic; North Sea Germanic; Anglo-Frisian; Anglic; Scots; Scots language; Middle Scots
- Early forms: Northumbrian Old English: Early Middle English; Early Scots

Language codes
- ISO 639-3: –
- Linguist List: sco-smi
- Glottolog: None

Middle Scots was a form of the Scots language from the Scottish Lowlands, spoken throughout the AD 1450 – 1700 period. By the end of the 15th century, its phonology, orthography, accidence, syntax and vocabulary had diverged markedly from Early Scots, which was virtually indistinguishable from early Northumbrian Middle English. Subsequently, the orthography of Middle Scots differed from that of the emerging Early Modern English standard that was being used in England. Middle Scots was fairly uniform throughout its many texts, albeit with some variation due to the use of Romance forms in translations from Latin or French, turns of phrases and grammar in recensions of southern texts influenced by southern forms, misunderstandings and mistakes made by foreign printers.

== History ==
The now established Stewart identification with the lowland language had finally secured the division of Scotland into two parts, the Gaelic Highlands and the Anglic Lowlands. The adherence of many Highlanders to the Catholic faith during the Reformation led to the 1609 Statutes of Iona forcing clan chiefs to establish Protestant churches, send their sons to Lowland schools and withdraw their patronage from the hereditary guardians of Gaelic culture – the bards. This was followed in 1616 by an act establishing parish schools in the Highlands with the aim of extirpating the Middle Gaelic language.

The Danish dependency of Orkney and Shetland had been held by Scottish magnates from the late 14th century. These had introduced the Lowland tongue which then began to replace Norn. In 1467 the islands became part of Scotland.

By the early 16th century the name Scottis (previously used to describe Gaelic in Ireland as well as Scotland) had been adopted for what had become the national language of the Stewart kingdom. The term Erse (Irish) was used instead for Gaelic, while Inglis (which previously referred to their own language) was increasingly used to refer only to the language south of the border. The first known instance of this shift in terminology was by an unknown man in 1494. In 1559, William Nudrye was granted a monopoly by the court to produce school textbooks, with two of the titles listed as Ane Schort Introduction: Elementary Digestit into Sevin Breve Tables for the Commodius Expeditioun of Thame That are Desirous to Read and Write the Scottis Toung and Ane Intructioun for Bairnis to be Learnit in Scottis and Latin, but there is no evidence that the books were ever printed.

From 1610 to the 1690s, during the Plantation of Ulster, some 200,000 Scots settled in the north of Ireland, taking what were to become the Ulster Scots dialects with them.

Later in the period southern influence on the language increased, owing to the new political and social relations with England prior to and following the accession of James VI to the English throne. By the time of the Union of Parliaments in 1707 southern Modern English was generally adopted as the literary language though Modern Scots remained the vernacular.

== Orthography ==
On the whole Middle Scots scribes never managed to establish a single standardised spelling for every word, but operated a system of free variation based on a number of spelling variants. Some scribes used their own variants, but this was relatively rare. The least variation occurred in the later 16th century as printers moved towards fixed spellings. Use of Middle Scots spelling variants ended in the 17th century when printers began to adopt imported English conventions.

Middle Scots used a number of now obsolete letters and letter combinations:

- þ (thorn) was equivalent to the modern th as in thae. þ was often indistinguishable from the letter y and often written so.
- ȝ (yogh) in nȝ was /ɲ/ as in the French Bretagne. It later changed to /ŋ/ or /nj/ leading to the modern spellings with z and y as in Menzies /ˈmɪŋʌs/ and Cunyie /ˈkʌnjiː/.
- ȝ (yogh) in initial position was /j/ as in ȝear 'year'.
- quh [xw] was equivalent to the modern wh.
- sch was equivalent to the modern sh.
- A ligature of long s and short s (ſs, italic ſs), similar to German ß, is sometimes used for s (with variant readings like sis). Encoded in Unicode as U+A7D6 Ꟗ LATIN CAPITAL LETTER MIDDLE SCOTS S and U+A7D7 ꟗ LATIN SMALL LETTER MIDDLE SCOTS S, because the character for German ß can also be a ligature of long s and z whereas the Middle Scots ligature cannot.
- An initial F is written either as a ligature of two f's (⟨ﬀ⟩) or as a single capital ⟨F⟩.
- The inflection -ys, -is was realised /ɪz/ after sibilate and affricate consonants and other voiced consonants, and /ɪs/ after other voiceless consonants, later contracted to /z/ and /s/ as in Modern Scots -s. The spelling -ys or -is also occurred in other words such as Inglis [ˈɪŋlɪs] and Scottis [ˈskotɪs] . The older Scots spelling surviving in place names such as Fowlis [fʌulz], Glamis [ɡlɑːmz] and Wemyss [wimz].
- d after an n was often (and still is) silent i.e. barrand is [ˈbarən] = barren.
- i and j were often interchanged.
- h was often silent.
- l after a and o had become vocalised and remained in use as an orthographic device to indicate vowel length. Hence the place names Balmalcolm /ˈbɑːməkoːm/, Falkirk /ˈfɑːkɪrk/, Kirkcaldy /kərˈkɑːdi/, Culross /ˈkuːrəs/ and Culter /ˈkuːtər/.
- i after a vowel was also used to denote vowel length, e.g. ai /aː/, ei /eː/ oi /oː/ and ui /øː/.
- u, v and w were often interchanged.
- After -ch and -th, some scribes affixed a pleonastic final -t (-cht, -tht); this was unpronounced.
- The word ane represented the numeral ane as well as the indefinite article an and a, and was pronounced similar to Modern Scots usage. For example, Ane Satyre of the Thrie Estaitis was pronounced a sateer o the three estates.
- The verbal noun (gerund) -yng (-ing) differentiated itself from the present participle -and /ən/, in Middle Scots, for example techynge, cryand and bydand—-the motto of the Gordon Highlanders. Both the verbal noun and present participle had generally merged to /ən/ by 1700.

== Phonology ==
The development of Middle Scots vowels:

		Middle Scots
	Early; Scots	Early c1575	Late c1600
Long Vowels
1:	iː →	ei →	ɛ(ː)i
2:	eː →	iː →	i(ː)
		↗
3:	ɛː →	eː
		↘
4:	aː →	ɛː →	e(ː)
5:	o̞ː →	oː →	oː
6:	uː →	uː →	u(ː)
	↗
6a:	u̞lː#, u̞lːC →	u̞l →	öl
7:	øː →	ø(ː) (iː) →	øː
Diphthongs
8a:	ai# →	ɛi →	ɛi
8:	aiː →	æi →	ei
8b:	?äː#, ?ɑː# →	aː →	e̞ː
9:	o̞i →	o̞i →	oɪ
10:	ui →	u̞i →	öi
11:	ei → eː →	iː →	i#
12:	au →	ɑː(aː) →	ɑː(aː)
12a:	al#, alC# ↗ →	al →	al
13:	o̞u →	o̞u →	o̞u
13a:	ol ↗ →	ol
14a:	iu → iu →	iu →	iu, ju
14b:	ɛːu → ɛu ↗
Short Vowels
15:	ɪ →	ɪ (ɛ̽) →	ɪ(ɛ̽)
16:	ɛ →	ɛ →	ɛ
17:	a →	a →	a
18:	o̞ →	o →	o
19:	u̞ →	u̞ →	ö

The Scottish Vowel Length Rule is assumed to have come into fruition between the early Middle Scots and late Middle Scots period. Here vowel length is conditioned by phonetic and morphemic environment. The affected vowels tended to be realised fully long in end-stressed syllables before voiced oral continuants except /l/, in hiatus, before word or morpheme boundaries and before /rd/ and /dʒ/.

The major differences to contemporary southern English were the now well established early merger of /ei/ with /e/ (dey 'die', ley 'lie'), early 15th century l-vocalisation where /al/ (except intervocalically and before /d/), /ol/ and usually /ul/ merged with /au/, /ou/ and /uː/, medial and final /v/ was lost (deil 'devil', ser 'serve'). The Great Vowel Shift occurred partially, /u/ and /øː/ remained unaffected, /ɔː/ became /oː/, /iː, eː, ɛː/ and /aː/ became /ɛi, iː, eː/ and /ɛː/.

== Literature ==
=== Sample text ===
This is an excerpt from Nicol Burne's anti-reformation pamphlet Of the praying in Latine (1581):

Thair be tua kynd of prayeris in the kirk, the ane is priuat, quhilk euerie man sayis be him self, the vthir is publik, quhilk the preistis sayis in the name of the hail kirk. As to the priuate prayeris, na Catholik denyis bot it is verie expedient that euerie man pray in his auin toung, to the end he vndirstand that quhilk he sayis, and that thairbie the interior prayer of the hairt may be the mair valkinnit, and conseruit the bettir; and gif, onie man pray in ane vther toung, it is also expedient that he vnderstand the mening of the vordis at the lest. For the quhilk caus in the catholik kirk the parentis or godfatheris ar obleist to learne thame quhom thay hald in baptisme the formes of prayeris and beleif, and instruct thame sufficiently thairin, sua that thay vndirstand the same: Albeit the principal thing quhilk God requiris is the hairt, that suppois he quha prayis vndirstand nocht perfytlie the vordis quhilk he spekis, yit God quha lukis in the hairt, vill nocht lat his prayer be in vane. As to the publik prayeris of the kirk, it is not necessar that the pepill vndirstand thame, becaus it is nocht the pepill quha prayis, bot the preistis in the name of the hail kirk, and it is aneuche that thay assist be deuotione liftand vp thair myndis to God or saying thair auin priuate oraisonis, and that be thair deuotione thay may be maid participant of the kirk. As in the synagogue of the Ieuis, the peopill kneu not quhat all thay cerimonies signifeit, quhilk vas keipit be the preistis and vtheris in offering of thair sacrifices and vther vorshipping of god, and yit thay did assist vnto thame; ye, sum of the preistis thame selfis miskneu the significatione of thir cerimoneis Than gif it vas aneuche to the pepill to vndirstand that in sik ane sacrifice consisted the vorshipping of God, suppois thay had not sua cleir ane vndirstanding of euerie thing that vas done thairin, sua in the catholik kirk, quhen the people assistis to the sacrifice of the Mess, thay acknaulege that thairbie God is vorshippit, and that it is institute for the remembrance of Christis death and passione. Albeit thay vndirstand nocht the Latine toung, yit thay ar not destitut of the vtilitie and fruit thairof. And it is nocht vithout greit caus that as in the inscrptione and titil quhilk pilat fixed vpone the croce of Christ Iesus thir thre toungis var vritt in, Latine, Greik, and Hebreu, sua in the sacrifice and the publik prayeris of the kirk thay ar cheiflie retenit for the conseruatione of vnitie in the kirk and nationis amang thame selfis; for, gif al thingis var turnit in the propir langage of euerie cuntrey, na man vald studie to the Latine toung, and thairbie al communicatione amangis Christiane pepil vald schortlie be tane auay, and thairbie eftir greit barbaritie inseu. Mairatour sik publique prayeris and seruice ar keipit mair perfytlie in thair auin integritie vithout al corruptione; for gif ane natione vald eik or pair onie thing, that vald be incontinent remarkt and reprouit be vther nationis, quhilk culd not be, gif euerie natione had al thai thingis turnit in the auin propir langage; as ye may se be experience, gif ye vald confer the prayeris of your deformit kirkis, togidder vith the innumerabil translationis of the psalmes, quihlk ar chaingit according to euerie langage in the quhilk thay ar turnit. It is not than vithout greit caus, and ane special instinctione of the halie Ghaist, that thir toungis foirspokin hes bene, as thay vil be retenit to the end of the varld. And quhen the Ieuis sall imbrace the Euangel than sall the sacrifice and other publik prayeris be in the Hebreu toung, according to that quhilk I said befoir, that on the Croce of Christ thai thrie toungis onlie var vrittin, to signifie that the kirk of Christ suld vse thay thre toungis cheiflie in his vorshipping, as the neu and auld testament ar in thir thre toungis in greitast authoritie amangis al pepill.

== See also ==
- History of the Scots language
- Phonological history of the Scots language
- Dictionary of the Scots Language
