= John Brand (minister) =

Minister of the Church of Scotland

- Born: circa 1668
- Died: 14 July 1738 (aged about 70)
- Occupation: Christian minister
- Known for: A Brief Description of Orkney

John Brand (c. 1668 – 1738) was a minister of the Church of Scotland and the author of A Brief Description of Orkney.

== Life ==
Brand was educated at the University of Edinburgh, where he graduated M.A. on 9 July 1688. After completing his divinity course, he was licensed to preach by the presbytery of Edinburgh, and on 3 January 1694-5 was ordained minister of the parish of Borrowstouness, Linlithgowshire.

In February 1700-1 he was appointed by the general assembly one of a deputation to visit Shetland, and, if convenient, Orkney and Caithness. His journey occupied from 18 April to 24 June, and after his return he published an account of his experiences under the title A Brief Description of Orkney, Zetland, Pightland-Firth, and Caithness; wherein, after a short journal of the author's voyage thither, these northern places are first more generally described, then a particular view is given of the several isles thereto belonging; together with an account of what is most rare and remarkable therein, with the author's observations thereupon. The book was reprinted in the third volume of Pinkerton's Voyages and Travels, and was also republished separately in 1883. Although it is of no special value in reference either to the antiquities or natural history of the islands, there is considerable interest in its descriptions of their condition, and of the mode of life of the inhabitants at a period when intercourse with the south was of the most limited kind.

He died on 14 July 1738, aged about seventy. By his wife, Elizabeth Mitchell, whom he married in 1700, he had a large family, and he was succeeded in the parish by his son William.
