= Scots Wikipedia =

Scots-language edition of Wikipedia

- Logo of the Scots Wikipedia

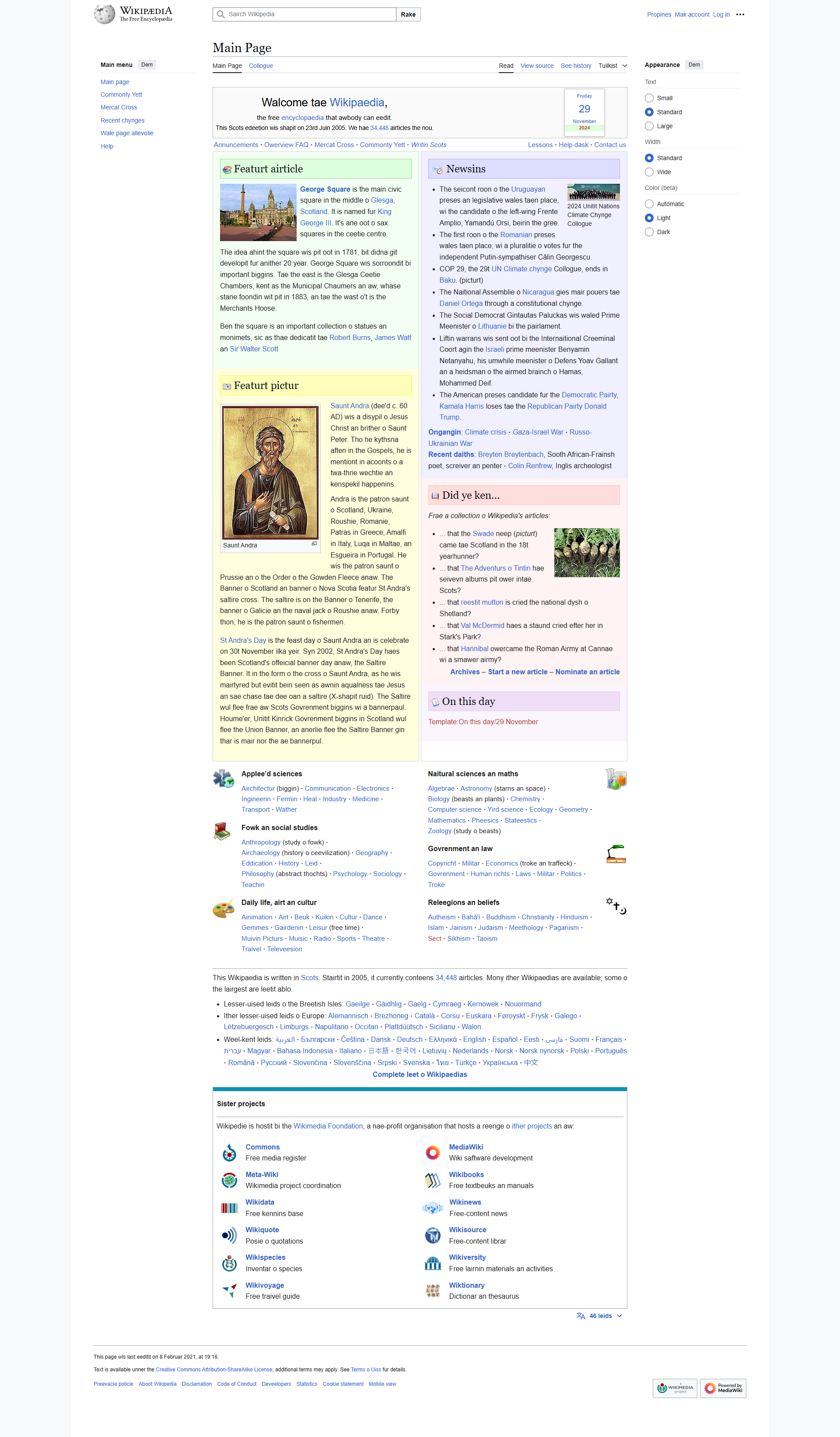
- Screenshot
- Website type: Internet encyclopaedia
- Available in: Scots
- Owner: Wikimedia Foundation
- Website: sco.wikipedia.org
- Commercial: No
- Registration: Optional
- Users: 139,375 users, 3 administrators as of 22 November 2026
- Launched: 23 June 2005; 21 years ago
- Content license: Creative Commons Attribution/ Share-Alike 4.0 (most text also dual-licensed under GFDL); Media licensing varies

The Scots Wikipedia (Scots: Scots Wikipædia) (Note: Pronunciation varies between [wikiˈpeːdia] and [wʌkiˈpeːdia]; see Modern Scots § Phonology.) is the Scots-language edition of the free online encyclopedia, Wikipedia. It was established on 23 June 2005, and it reached 1,000 articles in February 2006, and 5,000 articles in November 2010. It has now 34,045 articles and is the 117th-largest Wikipedia.

The Scots Wikipedia is one of nine Wikipedias written in an Anglic language or English-based pidgin or creole, the others being the English Wikipedia, the Simple English Wikipedia, the Old English Wikipedia, the Tok Pisin (Papuan Pidgin) Wikipedia, the Jamaican Patois Wikipedia, the Sranan Tongo Wikipedia, the Nigerian Pidgin Wikipedia, and the Ghanaian Pidgin Wikipedia.

In August 2020, the wiki received scrutiny from the media for the poor quality of its Scots writing and the discovery that at least 20,000 articles had been written by an editor who did not speak the language. This attention led to a review of the wiki's content by Scots speakers as well as editors from the wider Wikipedia community. Most of the editor's articles were deleted, reducing the number of articles from about 55,000 in 2018 to about 40,000 in 2021.

== Early reception ==
By February 2008, the site contained 2,200 articles and had outpaced Māori Wikipedia and Kashmiri Wikipedia. Reported reception, however, was mixed: Scotland on Sunday's literary editor described it as "convoluted at best, and an absolute parody at worst", while Ted Brocklebank, culture spokesman for the Scottish Tories, described it as a "cheap attempt at creating a language". However, Chris Robinson, director of the Dictionary of the Scots Language, wrote: "The fact it is doing well gives a lie to all those people who decry Scots and try to do it down." In 2014, Jane C. Hu of Slate described the site as reading "like a transcription of a person [speaking English] with a Scottish accent" and said one Wikipedia editor had proposed that the project be closed, in the mistaken belief that it was a practical joke.

== Pseudo-Scots controversy ==
In August 2020, the site attracted attention after a Reddit post noted that the project contained an unusually high number of articles written in poor-quality Scots. They were written by a single prolific contributor, who was an American teenager. Quartz reporter Nicolás Rivero described these articles as written in "English with a put-on Scottish accent, ignoring actual Scots grammar and vocabulary."

Nearly 23,000 articles, approximately a third of the entire Scots Wikipedia at that time, were created by the editor. Following public backlash, the editor wrote an apology.

In response to the controversy, the Scots Wikipedia started a review of its articles for language inaccuracies, and deleted many of the affected articles.

Robert McColl Millar, professor in linguistics and Scottish language at the University of Aberdeen, has said that the affected articles displayed "a very limited knowledge both of Modern Scots and its earlier manifestations". Michael Dempster, director of the Scots Language Centre, contacted the Wikimedia Foundation over the possibility of building upon the Scots Wikipedia's existing infrastructure, describing the renewed interest in the site as having "potential to be a great online focus" for the Scots language.

== See also ==
- Zhemao hoaxes
- List of Wikipedias
- List of Wikipedia controversies
