= Greville G Corbett =

Greville G. Corbett (born 23 December 1947) is Distinguished Professor of Linguistics at the University of Surrey and founder member of the Surrey Morphology Group.

== Biography ==
He was educated at the University of Birmingham where he was awarded a BA, MA and PhD. He joined the University of Surrey in 1974. He has been a Fellow of the British Academy since 1997 and is an Academician of the Academy of Social Sciences, a Member of the Academia Europaea and an Honorary Member of the Linguistic Society of America. As an author, he is widely held in libraries worldwide. In 2017, he signed the Declaration on the Common Language of the Croats, Serbs, Bosniaks and Montenegrins.

== Research ==
He has three broad areas of interest:

1. Typology. He works on the typology of features, as in Gender (1991), Number (2000), Agreement (2006) and Features (2012), all with Cambridge University Press. Recently, with several colleagues, he has been developing the canonical approach to typology. Within that approach he has papers in Language, on suppletion (2007) and on lexical splits (2015). For some years he has been developing the Canonical Typology framework, which has expanded beyond its original heartland of morphology and syntax to include work in phonology and sign language.
2. Morphosyntactic features. Number, gender, person and case all offer interesting challenges.
3. Inflectional Morphology (especially Network Morphology) the European Research Council funded project Morphological Complexity which examined the ways in which morphological structure introduces complexity which has no apparent function outside this component. Corbett's resulting research on the typology of splits in paradigms has appeared in Language. His most recent work is on conditions on inflection, the generalisations which cross-cut the generalisations provided by inflection classes, and concerned with the practical issue of how inflectional material is represented in a transparent and comprehensible way.

== Published works ==
- Corbett, Greville G. (1991). Gender. Cambridge University Press. ISBN 978-0-521-32939-2.
- Comrie, Bernard; —— (1993). The Slavonic Languages. Routledge. ISBN 978-0-415-04755-5.
- —— (2000). Number. Cambridge University Press. ISBN 978-0-521-64016-9.
- —— (2006). Agreement. Cambridge University Press. ISBN 978-0-521-00170-0.
- —— (2012). Features. Cambridge University Press. ISBN 978-1-107-02623-0.
- Chumakina, Marina; —— (2012). Periphrasis: The Role of Syntax and Morphology in Paradigms. Oxford University Press. ISBN 978-0-19-726525-3.
- Brown, Dunstan; Chumakina, Marina; —— (2012). Canonical Morphology and Syntax. Oxford University Press. ISBN 978-0-19-960432-6.
- —— (2013). The Expression of Gender. The Expression of Cognitive Categories (ECC). Vol. 6. Berlin: De Gruyter Mouton. ISBN 978-3-11-030733-7.
- Baerman, Matthew; Brown, Dunstan; —— (2015). Understanding and Measuring Morphological Complexity. Oxford University Press. ISBN 978-0-19-872376-9.
- Bond, Oliver; ——; Chumakina, Marina; Brown, Dunstan (2016). Archi: Complexities of agreement in cross-theoretical perspective. Oxford University Press. ISBN 978-0-19-874729-1.
