= Shetland News =

The Shetland News is a news website serving the islands of Shetland, Scotland.

Previously, The Shetland News was a weekly newspaper published between 1885 and 1963. The website, published by an unrelated company (Zetnews Limited), was launched in 1995, on the idea of IT entrepreneur Graeme Storey. The founding directors included Graeme Storey and Jonathan Wills.

In 1996, The Shetland Times and The Shetland News were involved in a landmark legal case over alleged copyright infringement and deep linking. The case was settled before going to court, by mutual agreement, regarding how web links would be made and specifically, how links would be accredited.

In March 2011, long-term Shetland News journalists Pete Bevington and Hans Marter (trading under 'Shetland News LLP') parted company with Graeme Storey (trading under 'Force 10') who owned the domain names, and had been providing IT management, web design and web hosting services for the website. Bevington and Marter moved the news service to a new domain, www.shetnews.co.uk. On 1 April 2011, Storey published a statement at the original domain (www.shetland-news.co.uk) describing the history and development of the website.

On 27 April 2011, Graeme Storey began to use the original domain (which had always been his property) as a news portal, re-branding it 'Shetland Daily', which pulls in content from other local, regional and national news websites offering Shetland related content.
