= Barbara E. Crawford =

Mediaeval historian of the Northern Isles and Scotland-Norway

Barbara Elizabeth Crawford OBE FRSE FSA FSAScot
- Born: Yorkshire, England
- Other name: Barbara Elizabeth Hall
- Occupations: Honorary Reader in Mediaeval History St Andrews University and Honorary Professor at the University of the Highlands and Islands
- Known for: Mediaeval history of the Northern Isles and Scotland -Norway and North Sea relationships
- Awards: Member of the Norwegian Academy of Science and Letters

Barbara Elizabeth Crawford OBE FRSE FSA FSAScot is a British historian. She is a leading authority on the mediaeval history of the Northern Isles of Scotland and Norwegian-Scottish 'frontier' and relations across the North Sea. She is Honorary Reader in Mediaeval History at the University of St Andrews, and Honorary Professor at the University of the Highlands and Islands. She was awarded an OBE for services to History and Archaeology in 2011. She became a Member of the Norwegian Academy of Science and Letters in 1997 and was elected a Fellow of the Royal Society of Edinburgh in 2001.

Crawford is also a Fellow of the Society of Antiquaries of London since 1964 and the Society of Antiquaries of Scotland since 1974, serving as president from 2008 to 2011. She has studied place names in the Norse and Celtic 'border' in Northern Scotland, the cult of St Clement in England, Scotland and Scandinavia, and excavations and reconstructions on Papa Stour, working with Scottish, Polish and Scandinavian collaborators, as well as a wide range of mediaeval northern history.

== Biography ==
Barbara Elizabeth Crawford or Hall was born in Yorkshire. She began an undergraduate degree at the University of St Andrews in 1959, and went on to graduate with an Upper Second Class Honours degree in Mediaeval and Modern History. During her studies she was a member of the St Andrews University Archaeological Society that was then run by Terence Mitford. In the 1960s, Crawford returned to St Andrews to pursue a postgraduate degree. In the late 1960s she started working as a tutor at the St Andrews Medieval History Department. She completed her PhD at University of St Andrews in 1971 as a result of seven years of research work, with a thesis titled 'The Earls of Orkney-Caithness and their relations with Norway and Scotland:1158-1470'. Crawford became a lecturer at the St Andrews Department of Mediaeval History in 1971 and taught at St Andrews for thirty years, until her early retirement in 2001.

With the funding of the University of St Andrews, as well as funding from the Carnegie Trust and a Leverhulme Scholarship, Crawford excavated the site of a post-Viking wooden Norse house on the Papa Stour island in Shetland. A report of this excavation The History and Excavation of a Royal Norwegian Farm at the Biggings, Papa Stour, Shetland was jointly published in 1999 by the Society of Antiquaries of Scotland and the Norwegian Academy of Science and Letters.

Since 2001 Crawford has continued pursuing her research and organising academic collaborations from her home, first in Fife and now in Orkney.

Her monograph Scandinavian Scotland published in 1987 has been described as 'the best monograph by far' on the topic.

Crawford edited a volume of Conference papers Papa Stour and 1299 resulted from a conference commemorating the 700th Anniversary of Shetland's first document and the completion of the Papa Stour excavations. The book got favourable reviews in 2003. She also carried out a study of many churches dedicated to St Clement in Scandinavia and Britain, two of which (Clementhorpe and Pontefract Castle) feature in an essay published in 2008.

In 2013, Crawford won a Carnegie Trust grant for The Northern Earldoms. Orkney and Caithness from 870 to 1470 AD, a book based on her doctoral thesis.

She has produced informal commentary on the survival of mediaeval church architecture, and about documents written in Scots from the period. Her chapter on St Clement's churches in Myth, Rulership, Church and Charters, was an essay in honour of fellow mediaeval historian Nicholas Brooks. In 2016 Crawford was a keynote speaker on 'Seals in Medieval Orkney, Communal and Personal Identity' at 'Visualising the North' 3rd International St Magnus Conference, having analysed the symbolism and meanings in detail, as discussed in Grohse's book the following year.

After retiring from a position as lecturer in 2001, Crawford participated in setting up the Strathmartine Trust, of which she now The chairman. The trust runs a Centre for retired historians without links to the university to aid them in pursuing their own historical interests. Crawford is also currently a member of the St Andrews University Archaeological Society's Committee.

== Selected publications ==
Selected by the University of St Andrews and citation available if not otherwise shown.

- Bates, C. R., Bates, M. R., Crawford, B., Sanmark, A., & Whittaker, J. (2020). 'The Norse waterways of West Mainland Orkney, Scotland.' Journal of Wetland Archaeology, Latest Articles.
- Crawford, B. E. (2007). Viking empires. Scottish Historical Review, 86, 128–131.
- Crawford, B. (2006). 'Land sea and home: Proceedings of a conference on Viking period settlement.' International Journal of Nautical Archaeology, 35, 163–165.
- Crawford, B. (2006). 'Viking pirates and Christian princes: Dynasty, religion, and empire in the North Atlantic'. International Journal of Nautical Archaeology, 35, 164–165.
- Crawford, B. E. (2006). 'The Cult of Clement in Denmark'. Historie (Jysk Selskab for Historie), 2006(2), 235–282.
- Crawford, B. E. (2006). 'Houseby, Harray and Knarston in the West Mainland of Orkney. Toponymic indicators of administrative authority?' In P. Gammeltoft, & B. Jorgensen (Eds.), Names through the looking glass: Festschrift in honour of Gillian Fellows-Jensen (pp. 21–44). C A Reitzels Forlag A/S.
- Crawford, B. E. (2006). 'Kongemakt og jarlemakt, stedsnavn som bevis? Betydningen av Houseby, Harray og sta∂irnavn på Orknøyenes West Mainland.' Viking. Norsk arkeologisk årbok, 69, 195–214.
- Crawford, B. E. (2005). 'The northern world. The history and heritage of northern Europe AD 400–1100.' Scottish Historical Review, 84, 267–269.
- Crawford, B. E. (2005). 'Norwegian history.' Scottish Historical Review, 84, 106–108.
- Crawford, B. E. (2005). 'The Govan Hogbacks and the Multi-Cultural Society of Tenth-century Scotland.' Old Govan Lecture Series, 3, 1-30.
- Crawford, B. E. (2004). 'The new history of Orkney'. Agricultural History Review, 52, 109–110.
- Crawford, B. E. (2003). 'The Bishopric of Orkney'. In S. Imsen (Ed.), Ecclesia Nidrosiensis 1153-1537: Søkelys på Nidaroskirkens og Nidarosprovinsens historie (pp. 143–157). Tapir Akademisk Forlag.
- Crawford, B. E. (2003). 'The Vikings'. In W. Davies (Ed.), From the Vikings to the Normans (pp. 40–71). Oxford University Press.
- Crawford, B. E. (2001). "Spes Scotorum" (Hope of Scots): Saint Columba, Iona and Scotland. Journal of Ecclesiastical History, 52, 709–711.
- Crawford, B. E. (2001). 'Alba: Celtic Scotland in the medieval era'. English Historical Review, 116, 169–170.
- Crawford, B. E., & Ballin Smith, B. (1999). 'The Biggings, Papa Stour, Shetland: The History and Excavation of a royal Norwegian Farm.'
- Crawford, B. E. (1999). 'The dedication to St Clement at Rodil, Harris'. In BE. Crawford (Ed.), Church, Chronicle and Learning in Mediaeval and Early Renaissance Scotland (pp. 109–122). Mercat Press.
- Crawford, B. E. (1998). 'Conversion and Christianity in the North Sea World.'
- Crawford, B. E. (1998). 'St Magnus and St Rognvald - the two Orkney Saints'. Records of the Scottish Church History Society, 28, 23–38.
- Crawford, B. E. (1995). Scandinavian Settlement in Northern Britain: Thirteen Studies of Place-names in Their Historical Context. Leicester University Press.
- Crawford, B. E. (1987). Scandinavian Scotland. Leicester University Press.

A Festschrift in her honour was held in 2007:

- Smith (Beverley Ballin) (ed.), Taylor (Simon) (ed.), Williams (Gareth) (ed.): West over sea: studies in Scandinavian sea-borne expansion and settlement before 1300. A Festschrift in honour of Dr. Barbara E. Crawford / edited by Beverly Ballin Smith, Simon Taylor and Gareth Williams. NW, 31. Turnhout: Brill, 2007. xxix + 581 pp. (The northern world, 31). Illus. tabs. pp. xxv-xxix: A bibliography of the published works of Barbara E. Crawford, to the end of 2006.
