= Early Scots =

West Germanic language

- Inglis
- Region: Scottish Lowlands
- Era: Developed into Middle Scots by the late 15th century
- Language family: Indo-European: Germanic; West Germanic; North Sea Germanic; Anglo-Frisian; Anglic; Scots; Scots language; Early Scots
- Early forms: Northumbrian Old English: Early Middle English

Language codes
- ISO 639-3: –
- One interpretation of the linguistic divide in 1400, here based on place-name evidence. Scottish Gaelic Early Middle English/Early Scots Norn

Early Scots was the emerging literary language of the Early Middle English–speaking parts of Scotland in the period before 1450. The northern forms of Early Middle English descended from Northumbrian Old English. During this period, speakers referred to the language as "English" (Inglis, Ynglis, and variants).

Early examples such as Barbour’s The Brus and Wyntoun’s Chronicle are better explained as part of Northern Early Middle English than as isolated forerunners of later Scots, a name first used to describe the language later in the Middle Scots period.

== History ==
Northumbrian Old English had been established in south-eastern Scotland as far as the River Forth in the 7th century and largely remained there until the 13th century, which is why in the late 12th century Adam of Dryburgh described his locality as "in the land of the English in the Kingdom of the Scots" and why the early 13th century author of de Situ Albanie wrote that the Firth of Forth "divides the kingdoms of the Scots and of the English".

Political developments in the 12th century facilitated the spread of the English language. Institutions such as the burghs first established by David I, mostly in the south and east of Scotland, brought new communities into the areas in which they were established. Incoming burghers were mainly English (notably from regions like Yorkshire and Huntingdonshire), Dutch and French. Although the military aristocracy employed French and Scottish Gaelic, these small urban communities appear to have been using English as something more than a lingua franca by the end of the 13th century, although this may not be surprising as the area south of the Forth in eastern lowland Scotland was already English speaking and had been since Anglo-Saxon times. Although the population of the largest burghs would have been counted in hundreds rather than thousands, a radical social shift occurred whereby many Gaelic speakers became assimilated into the new social system and its language.

The increasing economic influence of the burghs attracted further English, Fleming and Scandinavian immigration. As the economic power of the burghs grew, Gaelic-speakers from the hinterland found it advantageous to acquire a working knowledge of English. The institutional language of the burghs consisted of vocabulary that was Germanic in origin, such English terms as toft (homestead and land), croft (smallholding), ruid (land let by a burgh), guild (a trade association), bow (an arched gateway), wynd (lane) and raw (row of houses).

Multilingualism and cultural diversity became increasingly the norm after David I. People in one part of the realm could be addressed as "Franci, Angli, Scoti et Gallovidiani" (French, English, Scots and Galloway-men). The end of the House of Dunkeld led to the throne being passed to three families of Anglo-French origin, the Balliols, Bruces and Stewarts. After the death of King Robert I, the kings of Scotland (with the exception of King Robert II) increasingly identified themselves with the English-speaking part of the kingdom. As a result, by the reign of King James I of Scotland, the political heartland of the Scottish king moved from the area around Scone and Perth to the traditionally English area around Edinburgh south of the Forth.

By the 14th and 15th centuries, the variety of English (Inglis) that resulted from the above influences had replaced Gaelic (Scottis) in much of the lowlands and Norman French had ceased to be used as the language of the elite. By this time differentiation into Southern, Central and Northern dialects had perhaps occurred. Scots was also beginning to replace Latin as a language for records and literature. In Caithness, it came into contact with both Norn and Gaelic.

== Vocabulary ==
The core vocabulary is of Anglo-Saxon origin although many of the differences in the phonology, morphology and lexicon in the northern and southern dialects of Middle English have been traced to the linguistic influence in the North of the eighth- and ninth-century Viking invaders who first plundered, then conquered and settled in, large territories in Northumbria, Lincolnshire and East Anglia. Scots also retained many words which became obsolete farther south. The pattern of foreign borrowings, such as Romance via ecclesiastical and legal Latin and French, was much the same as that of contemporary English but was often different in detail because of the continuing influence of the Auld Alliance and the imaginative use of Latinisms in literature.

During this period a number of words of Anglo-Saxon origin, such as anerly (alone), berynes (grave), clenge (cleanse), halfindall (a half part), scathful (harmful), sturting (contention), thyrllage (bondage), and umbeset (surround), were now almost or completely unique to Scots.

French-derived warfare terms such as arsoun (saddle-bow), bassynet (helmet), eschell (battalion), hawbrek (coat of mail), qwyrbolle (hardened leather), troppell (troop), vaward (vanguard), and vyre (crossbow bolt) became part of the language along with other French vocabulary such as cummer (godmother), disjone (breakfast), dour (stern, grim), fasch (annoy), grosar (gooseberry), ladron (rascal), moyen (means), plenissing (furniture) and vevaris (provisions).

The vocabulary of Scots was augmented by the speech of Scandinavians, Flemings, Dutch and Middle Low German speakers through trade with, and immigration from, the Low Countries.

From Scandinavian (often via Scandinavian influenced Middle English) came at (that/who), byg (build), bak (bat), bla (blae), bra (brae), ferlie (marvel), flyt (remove), fra (from), gar (compel), gowk (cuckoo), harnis (brains), ithand (industrious), low (flame), lug (an appendage, ear), man (must), neve (fist), sark (shirt), spe (prophesy), þa (those), til (to), tinsell (loss), wycht (valiant), and wyll (lost, confused).

The Flemings introduced bonspell (sporting contest), bowcht (sheep pen), cavie (hen coop), crame (a booth), furisine (flint striker), grotkyn (a gross), howff (courtyard), kesart (cheese vat), lunt (match), much (a cap), muchkin (a liquid measure), skaff (scrounge), wapinschaw (muster of militia), wyssill (change of money), and the coins plak, stek and doyt.

A number of Gaelic words such as breive (judge), cane (a tribute), couthal (court of justice), davach (a measure of land), duniwassal (nobleman), kenkynolle (head of the kindred), mare (tax collector), and toschachdor (leader, cf. Irish taoiseach, Welsh tywysog) occurred in early legal documents but most became obsolete early in the period. Gaelic words for topographical features have endured, such as bogg (bog), carn (pile of stones), corrie (hollow in a hill), crag (rock), inch (small island), knok (hill), loch (lake or fjord), and strath (river valley).

== Orthography ==
The language first appeared in written form in the mid-14th century, when its written form differed little from that of northern English dialects, and so Scots shared many Northumbrian borrowings from Old Norse and Anglo-Norman French. The reduced set of verb agreement endings in particular give the language an uncannily modern appearance when compared to the writing of English contemporaries such as Geoffrey Chaucer. Some orthographic features distinguishing Northern Middle English and Early Scots from other regional variants of written Middle English are:

The notable use of the Northern subject rule, which according to one hypothesis, is thought to have arisen through contact with the Celtic languages of Britain during the early medieval period. Another hypothesis proposes a possible path of developments from the reduction of verbal affixes followed by originally enclitic postverbal pronouns.

The forms of the third person plural pronoun they/their/them (derived from Old Norse) which later moved southwards to replace the older Southern he/here/hem forms (derived from Old English). One reason why the Northern forms were ultimately successful is that they got rid of the ambiguity of early Southern Middle English he (which could mean 'he', 'they', or even in some dialects 'she') and hir(e), her(e) (which could mean either 'her' or 'their').

The reduced set of verb agreement endings originating in the 9th or 10th centuries. In Northern Middle English, in the present tense, in all persons and numbers but the first singular, which had –e, the ending was –(e)s; and in Scotland even the first person singular was occasionally –s. Whereas the Old English and Southern and Midlands Middle English pattern had –e, -(e)s(t), -(e)th in the three persons of the singular and –(a)th (-(e)n in the Midlands) in all persons of the plural.

Loss of the Old English prefix ge-, often y- or i- further south.

The bare stem infinitive (sing rather than the Old English singan), whereas the past participle -en inflection was used in the South. The final e was silent in the North but still pronounced further south.

The northern present participle –and, whereas –-inge(e), –ynge(e) was used in the South, and the northern past participle of strong verbs, in for example, drive(n) and southern ydrive.

The Scottish -yt/-it for the past tense, the northern form was usually -yd/-id where further south -ed was used.

In the North and in the Northeast Midlands evidence from poetry indicates a pattern unlike that of Old English reflecting contact with a Scandinavian-influenced one. Whereas in the West Midlands and Southern dialects of early Middle English the verb-second (V2) pattern of Old English is largely maintained.

Other differences between Northern and Southern Middle English were the adoption of function words of Norse origin, but also phonological effects such as the replacement of Old English /ʃ/ sh by /sk/ sk, sc and /k/ and /ɡ/ for the palatalized /tʃ/ and /dʒ/. Other phonological differences included the simplification in the initial sc/sh- /ʃ/ fricative to /s/ (suld, should; sall, shall). The retention of Old English long a in where, further south, this long a had "rounded" to an open o: (hayly holy, ane one, wald would awne own, hald hold). The practice of indicating a long vowel by means of a following –y or –i: (boite boot, doyne done, soyne soon, boythe both). The spelling quh for wh, ch for gh or ȝ, ȝ for /j/, y for th or þ, double ff to indicate unvoiced final consonants (haiff have, gyff give) and, of course, the use of words, or forms of words, that were common only in the northern dialects.

By the end of the period when Middle Scots began to emerge, orthography and phonology had diverged significantly from that of Northern Middle English.

== Phonology ==
The Early Scots vowel system (c 1375)

Long vowels		Diphthongs		Short vowels	
Realisation	Examples	Realisation	Examples	Realisation	Examples
1: /iː/	mine	8: /ai/	pain	15: /ɪ/	pin
2: /eː/	sene (seen)	9: /oi/	noise	16: /ɛ/	men
3: /ɛː/	lene (lean)	10: /ui/	point	17: /a/	man
4: /aː/	bane (bone)	11: /ei/	dey (die)	18: /o/	fon (folly)
5: /oː/	cole (coal)	12: /au/	law	19: /u/	gun
6: /uː/	doun (down)	13: /ou/	lown (calm)		
7: /øː/ (/yː/)	mone (moon)	14a: /iu/	spew, grew		
		14b: /ɛu, ɛou/	dew		

The major differences to contemporary southern English are the outcome of Anglo-Saxon /oː/ as /øː/, the distribution of the unchanged Anglo-Saxon /aː/ and /oː/ from Anglo-Saxon /o/. The Scandinavian-influenced /k/ in words such as birk (birch), brekis (breeches), brig (bridge), kirk (church), kist (chest), mekil (much) and rig (ridge), and the retention of Germanic /ou/ in words such as lowp (leap), cowp (cf. cheap, to trade) and nowt (cattle).

== Literature ==
=== Sample text ===
Renunciation by Alexander Lindsay, knight, Lord of Glenesk, of certain lands, in favour of Margaret Countess of Marr and her sister Elizabeth. 12 March 1379.

Till all þat þir lettres herys or seis Alysandre lyndessay lorde of glennesk knycht gretyng in god euer lestand Wete yhe me for me and myn ayres and assigneȝ at þe instance of a noble & mychty lorde Sir William Erle of Douglas & of Marr haue releissit quytclaymit & for euer mare remittyt till an honorable lady dame Mergarete contesse of Marr & to Elyȝabeth hir systir dachteris & ayres till an michty lorde Thomas stywarde som tyme Erle of Angous all my rycht clayme persuit chalenge or askyng þat I or myn ayres has or may haue or our assignes in tyme to come be ony ways to fourty markis worth of land in ye qwilkes ye foresaid Erle of Angous was obligit be his lettres to gyve me heritably eftir þat I had tane þe ordre of knycht sa þat nowthir I no myn ayres no our assigneȝ þe foresaid dame Mergarete Elyȝabeth hir systir þair ayres no þair assigneȝ by cause of þe foresaid fourty markis worth of land no for na maner of rerageȝ þare of may chalenge inquiete distourble or be cause foresaid aganis þaim qhestioun or plede in tyme to cum be ony maner of way bot fra all manere of rycht and colour lauch of askyng following owthir to possessioun or proprete to þe forsaid thingis be ws excludit & assoillit be þir lettres for euer mare And in case gif I or myn ayres or assigneȝ in þe contrare of þis lettre in tyme to come before ony Iuge sall attempt or moue I wil & granteȝ þat our folowing be nocht herd as thing of na valu no of strenthe but fraude or gyle In wytness here of to þis lettre I haue put my sele þe xij day of Marce þe yhere of grace m·iii^{c} sevynty & nyne

== See also ==
- History of the Scots language
- Phonological history of the Scots language
- Dictionary of the Scots Language
