= Robert McColl Millar =

Scottish professor and academic

- Born: 31 May 1966 (age 59); Elderslie, United Kingdom
- Citizenship: British
- Occupation: professor

Robert McColl Millar is a Scottish academic, editor, researcher and professor. He holds the chair of Professor in Linguistics and Scottish Language at the University of Aberdeen. He edits the periodical Scottish Language.

== Biography ==
He is a native speaker of Scots and hails from a Gaelic-speaking background. He is married to a school teacher who is originally from Luxembourg.

== Career ==
Millar has specialised in the research fields of linguistics, macrolinguistics, Scottish languages and medieval European languages. He chaired the Forum for Research on the Languages of Scotland and Ulster from 2009 to 2017.

He has voiced his concerns regarding the drastic decline of the use of Scots, one of the largest minority languages in Europe. In August 2020, he responded to a controversy which emerged regarding Scots Wikipedia, assessing that the affected articles displayed a very limited knowledge both of Modern Scots and its earlier manifestations.
