= The Shetland Times =

Weekly newspaper in Shetland, Scotland

- Type: Weekly newspaper
- Owner(s): Highland News and Media
- Founded: 1872; 154 years ago
- Language: English
- City: Lerwick, Shetland, Scotland
- Country: Scotland
- Website: www.shetlandtimes.co.uk

The Shetland Times is a weekly newspaper in Shetland, published on Fridays and based in Lerwick, the main town in the Shetland Islands.

== History ==
Known locally as The Times, Shetland's only surviving print newspaper was established in 1872. Until 2025, it had been owned by the same family for more than a century.

As recently as 2015 the weekly title had sold around 11,000 copies – effectively to half of the islands' total population. However, by 2024 print sales had dropped to 3,400, with a year-on-year fall of around 9%—admittedly only about half of that experienced by many national newspapers.

The paper was put up for sale in April 2025, with the threat of imminent closure if a buyer couldn't be found. In June it was announced that The Times had been sold to Highland News and Media, publisher of the John O'Groat Journal and Northern Times. The sale saved the jobs of the paper's five journalists and two advertising staff.

The Shetland Times had previously been printed locally by a sister company in Gremista. Under the new ownership, printing will now take place on the Scottish mainland, potentially adding delays to the paper's distribution because of poor sea conditions.

The Shetland islands are also served by the online-only Shetland News, BBC Radio Shetland, and by other journalists on the islands.

== Editors ==
From February 2006 until February 2008 the editor was Jonathan Lee, formerly of the Aberdeen Evening Express. Lee left the Shetland Times following newsroom staff passing a vote of no confidence in his editorship. He was succeeded by Paul Riddell, a former assistant editor of The Scotsman.
