= List of Germanic languages =

The Germanic languages include some 58 (SIL estimate) languages and dialects that originated in Europe; this language family is part of the Indo-European language family. Each subfamily in this list contains subgroups and individual languages.

The standard division of Germanic is into three branches:

- East Germanic languages
- North Germanic languages
- West Germanic languages

They all descend from Proto-Germanic, and ultimately from Proto-Indo-European.

South Germanic languages, an attempt to classify some of the West Germanic languages into a separate group, is rejected by the overwhelming majority of scholars.

† denotes extinct languages.

== West Germanic ==
- Proto-West Germanic
  - High German languages
    - Old High German† & Middle High German†
      - Modern German
        - Upper German
          - High Franconian
            - East Franconian
            - South Franconian
          - Alemannic
            - Swabian, including Stuttgart
            - Low Alemannic, including the area of Lake Constance and Basel German
              - Alsatian
              - Colonia Tovar German
            - Central Alemannic
              - Argentinien-schwyzertütsch
            - Italian Walser
            - High Alemannic, including Zürich German and Bernese German
            - Highest Alemannic, including the Bernese Oberland dialects and Walliser German
          - Bavarian
            - Northern Bavarian (including Nuremberg)
            - Central Bavarian (including Munich and Vienna)
            - Southern Bavarian (including Innsbruck, Klagenfurt, and Bolzano, Italy)
              - Hutterite German aka "Tirolean"
            - Mócheno
            - Cimbrian
        - Central German
          - West Central German
            - Amana German
            - Central Franconian
              - Ripuarian Franconian
              - Moselle Franconian
                - Hunsrik
                - Luxembourgish
                - Transylvanian Saxon
            - Rhine Franconian
              - Hessian
              - Palatine
                - Pennsylvania German (spoken by the Amish and other groups in southeastern Pennsylvania)
              - Lorraine Franconian
          - East Central German
            - Thuringian
            - Upper Saxon
            - North Upper Saxon–South Markish
            - Silesian
              - Halcnovian
              - Wymysorys (with a significant influence from Low Saxon, Dutch, Polish, and Scots)
            - High Prussian
        - Yiddish (with a significant influx of vocabulary from Hebrew and other languages, and traditionally written in the Hebrew alphabet)
          - Eastern Yiddish
          - Western Yiddish
  - Low Franconian languages
    - Old Frankish†
      - Old Low Franconian†
        - Old East Low Franconian† / Old Limburgian†
          - Middle Limburgian†
            - Limburgian
        - Old West Low Franconian† / Old Dutch†
          - Middle Dutch†
            - Modern Dutch
              - West Flemish
              - East Flemish
              - Zeelandic
              - Central Dutch
                - Hollandic
                - Kleverlandish
              - Brabantine
                - Brusselian
              - Stadsfries dialects
            - Afrikaans (with a significant influx of vocabulary from other languages)
  - Low German languages
    - Old Saxon† & Middle Low German†
      - Modern Low German
        - West Low German
          - Northern Low Saxon
          - East Frisian Low Saxon
          - Westphalian
          - Eastphalian
        - East Low German
          - Brandenburgisch
          - Mecklenburgisch-Vorpommersch
          - Middle Pomeranian
          - East Pomeranian
          - Low Prussian
          - Plautdietsch (Mennonite Low German, used also in many other countries)
  - Anglo-Frisian languages
    - Old Frisian†
      - Frisian
        - West Frisian languages
          - West Frisian language (spoken in the Netherlands)
            - Clay Frisian (Klaaifrysk)
            - Wood Frisian (Wâldfrysk)
              - Noardhoeks
            - South Frisian (Súdhoeks)
            - Southwest Frisian (Súdwesthoeksk)
            - Schiermonnikoogs
            - Hindeloopers
            - Aasters
            - Westers
        - East Frisian language (spoken in Germany)
          - Saterland Frisian
          - Wangerooge Frisian†
          - Wursten Frisian†
        - North Frisian language (spoken in Germany)
          - Mainland Frisian
            - Mooring
            - Goesharde Frisian
            - Wiedingharde Frisian
            - Halligen Frisian
            - Karrharde Frisian
          - Island Frisian
            - Söl'ring
            - Fering
            - Öömrang
            - Heligolandic
    - Anglic
      - English language (dialects)
        - Old English†
          - Middle English† (significant influx of words from Old French)
            - Early Modern English†
              - Modern English
                - British English (English English, including Northern English, East Midlands English, West Midlands English, Southern English, and others, Welsh English, Scottish English) and Irish English
                - North American English (American English and Canadian English)
                - Australian English and New Zealand English
                - South African English
                - Zimbabwean English
                - South Asian English (Indian English)
                - South East Asian English (Philippine English, Singapore English, Malaysian English)
                - West Indian English (Caribbean English)
      - Lowland Scots
        - Early Scots†
          - Middle Scots†
            - Modern Scots
              - Glasgow
              - Northern Scots
                - North Northern
                  - Black Isle and Easter Ross
                    - Cromarty†
                - Mid Northern (North East Scots or the Doric)
                - South Northern
              - Central Scots
              - Southern Scots
              - Insular Scots
                - Orcadian
                - Shetlandic
              - Ulster Scots
      - Yola†
      - Fingallian†

== North Germanic ==
Ancestral classification

- Proto-Norse ^{†}
  - Old Norse ^{†}
    - West Scandinavian
      - Old West Norse ^{†}
        - Old Norwegian ^{†}
          - Middle Norwegian ^{†}
            - Modern Norwegian dialects
              - Nordnorsk (Northern Norway)
                - Bodø dialect (Bodø)
                - Brønnøy dialect (Brønnøy)
                - Helgeland dialect (Helgeland)
                - other dialects
              - Trøndersk (Trøndelag)
                - Fosen dialect (Fosen)
                - Härjedal dialect (Härjedalen)
                - Jämtland dialects (Jämtland province) (wide linguistic similarity with the Trøndersk dialects in Norway)
                - Meldal dialect (Meldal)
                - Tydal dialect (Tydal)
                - other dialects
              - Vestlandsk (Western and Southern Norway)
                - West (Vestlandet)
                  - Bergen dialect (Bergen)
                  - Haugesund dialect (Haugesund)
                  - Jærsk dialect (Jæren district)
                  - Karmøy dialect (Karmøy)
                  - Nordmøre dialects (Nordmøre)
                    - Sunndalsøra dialect (Sunndalsøra)
                  - Romsdal dialect (Romsdal)
                  - Sandnes dialect (Sandnes)
                  - Sogn dialect (Sogn district)
                  - Sunnmøre dialect (Sunnmøre)
                  - Stavanger dialect (Stavanger)
                  - Strilar dialect (Midhordland district)
                - South (Sørlandet)
                  - Arendal dialect (Arendal region)
                  - Valle-Setesdalsk dialect (Upper Setesdal, Valle)
                - other dialects
              - Østlandsk (Eastern Norway)
                - Flatbygd dialects (Lowland districts)
                  - Vikværsk dialects (Viken district)
                    - Andebu dialect (Andebu)
                    - Bohuslän dialect (Bohuslän province) (influenced by Swedish in retrospective)
                    - Grenland dialect (Grenland district)
                    - Oslo dialect (Oslo)
                  - Midtøstland dialects (Mid-east districts)
                    - Ringerike dialects (Ringerike district)
                      - Hønefoss dialect (Hønefoss)
                      - Ådal dialect (Ådal)
                  - Oppland dialect (Opplandene district)
                    - Hedmark dialects (Hedmark)
                      - Solung dialect (Solør)
                  - Hadeland dialect (Hadeland district)
                  - Østerdal dialect (Viken district)
                    - Särna-Idre dialect (Särna and Idre)
                - Midland dialects (Midland districts)
                  - Gudbrandsdal dialect (Gudbrandsdalen, Oppland and Upper Folldal, Hedmark)
                  - Hallingdal-Valdres dialects (Hallingdal, Valdres)
                    - Hallingdal dialect
                    - Valdris dialect (Valdres district)
                  - Telemark-Numedal dialects (Telemark and Numedal)
                    - Bø dialect
                - other dialects
          - Old Faroese ^{†}
            - Middle Faroese ^{†}
              - Modern Faroese
          - Norn †
            - Caithness Norn †
            - Orkney Norn †
            - Shetland Norn †
        - Old Icelandic ^{†}
          - Middle Icelandic ^{†}
            - Modern Icelandic
        - Greenlandic Norse †
    - East Scandinavian
      - Old East Norse ^{†}
        - Old Danish ^{†}
          - Middle Danish ^{†}
            - Modern Danish
              - Bornholmsk
              - Island Danish
              - Jutlandic/Jutish
                - North Jutlandic
                - East Jutlandic
                - West Jutlandic
                - South Jutlandic (Danish: Slesvig; German: Schleswig)
            - Gøtudanskt (Faroese street Danish)
            - Urban East Norwegian (generally considered a Norwegian dialect)
        - Old Swedish ^{†}
          - Modern Swedish
            - Norrland dialects
            - Svealand Swedish
              - Dalecarlian
                - Elfdalian (considered a Swedish Sveamål dialect, but has official orthography and is, because of a lower degree of mutual intelligibility with Swedish, considered a separate language by many linguists, see p. 6 in this reference)
            - Götamål (Götaland)
            - East Swedish
              - Swedish dialects in Ostrobothnia
              - Other dialects of Finland Swedish
              - Estonian Swedish
            - South Swedish
        - Old Gutnish ^{†}
          - Modern Gutnish
            - Fårömål dialect

Alternate classification of contemporary North Germanic languages based on mutual intelligibility

- Insular Scandinavian
  - Icelandic
  - Faroese
- Continental Scandinavian
  - Danish
  - Norwegian
  - Swedish

== East Germanic ==
- East Germanic †
  - Gothic †
  - Vandalic †
  - Burgundian †
  - Crimean Gothic † (disputed, alternatively considered to be West Germanic)
