= Scottish vowel length rule =

Phonetic rule in Scots and Scottish English

The Scottish vowel length rule describes how vowel length in Scots, Scottish English, and, to some extent, Ulster English and Geordie is conditioned by the phonetic environment of the vowel. It is also known as Aitken's law in reference to the Scottish linguist A. J. Aitken, who formulated the generalization. Primarily, the rule is that certain vowels (described below) are phonetically long in the following environments:

- Before /r/.
- Before a voiced fricative (/v, z, ð, ʒ/).
- Before a morpheme boundary.
- In a word-final open syllable, save for the HAPPY vowel /e/ (or, in some Borders accents and Geordie, /iː/).

Exceptions can also exist for particular vowel phonemes, dialects, words, etc., some of which are discussed in greater detail below.

== Phonemes ==
The underlying phonemes of the Scottish vowel system (that is, in both Scottish Standard English dialects and Scots dialects) are as follows:

Aitken's Scots vowel number	1	2	3		16	4	8	8a	10	9	5	6	7	14	11	12	18	13		15	17	19
Scots phoneme	/ai~əi/★	/i/★	/ei/ (Note: Vowel 3 remains a distinct phoneme /ei/ only in some North Northern Scots varieties, generally merging with /i/ or /e/ in other Modern Scots varieties.)		/ɛ/★	/e/★	/eː~eːə/ (Note: In most Central and Southern Scots varieties vowel 8 /eː/ merges with vowel 4 /e/. Some other varieties distinguish between the two at least partially. In Ulster Scots the realisation may be [ɛː]. In non-rhotic Geordie, they are distinguished by quality; FACE is [eː], [ɪə] or [eɪ], whereas SQUARE is [ɛː], distinguished from DRESS by length. The vowels are not phonemically distinct in Scottish English, which is a rhotic variety.)	/əi/		/oi/	/o/	/ʉ/★ (Note: Stem-final /ʉ/, is diphthongised to /ʌʉ/ in Southern Scots.)	/ø/★ (Note: Most Central Scots varieties merge /ø/ with /e/ in long environments and with /ɪ/ in short environments, but most Northern Scots varieties merge /ø/ with /i/. /ø/ generally remains [ø], sometimes [y] in short environments, in the conservative dialects of Scots spoken in parts of Perthshire and Angus, Berwickshire, Roxburghshire, East Dumfriesshire, Orkney and Shetland. Before /k/ and /x/ /ø/ is often realised [(j)ʉ] or [(j)ʌ] depending on dialect.)	/jʉ/	/iː/★ (Note: Stem-final /iː/ is diphthongised to [əi] or [ei] in Southern Scots.)	/ɔː/	/ɔ/★ (Note: /ɔ/ (vowel 18) may merge with /o/ (vowel 5) in Central and Southern Scots varieties.)	/ʌʉ/★ (Note: /ʌʉ/ may be merged with /o/ before /k/ in many Modern Scots varieties.)	—N/a	/ɪ/ (Note: In some eastern and Southern Scots varieties /ɪ/ approaches /ɛ/ in quality. Whether this results in a phonemic merger needs to be further researched.)	/a/★ (Note: In some Modern Scots varieties /a/ may merge with /ɔː/ in long environments. (see below))	/ʌ/
Scottish English phoneme	/ai~əi/★	/i/★		/ɛ/★		/e/★ (Note: The final vowel in happY is best identified as an unstressed allophone of FACE for most speakers of Scottish English and Ulster English: /ˈhape/. In Geordie, it is best identified as an unstressed allophone of FLEECE: /ˈhapiː/.)			/ɔi/		/o/	—N/a	/ʉ/★ (Note: /ʉ/ corresponds to two phonemes in Geordie (as in most other English accents): /uː/ GOOSE versus /ʊ/ FOOT; however, this /ʊ/ is not distinguished from /ʌ/, those vowels having never historically split in Geordie. In other words, the two relevant phonemes in all Scottish and Ulster varieties are FOOT/GOOSE versus STRUT, whereas in Geordie the two are FOOT/STRUT versus +GOOSE.)	/jʉ/ (Note: In English, /jʉ/ is normally regarded as a consonant+vowel sequence, rather than a diphthong. In this article, it is analysed as a diphthong, following Aitken.) (Note: /j/ merges with the preceding alveolar stop to form a postalveolar affricate in the case of yod-coalescence. Tune is best analysed as /tʃʉn/ for many speakers of Scottish English.)	—N/a	/ɔ/ (Note: Vowel 12 /ɔː/ is typically distinguished from vowel 18 /ɔ/ in Scots but not in Scottish English, which features the cot-caught merger. Furthermore, this merged vowel may be invariably long in all environments, for some dialects. In Geordie, the vowels are distinct as /ɔː/ for THOUGHT/NORTH and /ɒ/ for LOT/CLOTH. They are normally distinct in Ulster English as well, where CLOTH has a long vowel /ɔː/.)		—N/a	/ʌʉ/★	/ɪ/	/a/★	/ʌ/
Wells' lexical sets	PRICE	FLEECE, NEAR		DRESS, NURSE (part) (Note: Wells' lexical set NURSE corresponds to three separate Scottish phoneme sequences: /ɛr/, /ɪr/ and /ʌr/ (as in fern, fir and fur respectively), as Scots and Scottish English have not undergone the NURSE mergers found in most other dialects of English.)		FACE, happY, SQUARE			CHOICE		GOAT, FORCE	—N/a	FOOT, GOOSE, CURE		—N/a	THOUGHT, LOT, CLOTH, NORTH		—N/a	MOUTH	KIT, NURSE (part)	TRAP, PALM, BATH, START	STRUT, NURSE (part)
Example words	bite, shire	beet, sheer	beat, shear	breath, head	bet, fern	bate, race	bait, raise	bay, ray	boil, join	boy, joy	boat, four	(aboot, mooth)	bush, boot, poor	beauty, pure	(dee, lee)	bought, flaw	bot, for	(nout, owre)	about, mouth	bit, fir	bat, farm	butt, fur

★ = Vowels that definitively follow the Scottish vowel length rule.

== Rule specifics and exceptions ==
The Scottish vowel length rule affects all vowels except the always-short vowels 15 and 19 (/ɪ/ and /ʌ/) and, in many Modern Scots varieties, the always-long Scots-only vowels 8, 11, and 12 (here transcribed as /eː/, /iː/ and /ɔː/) that do not occur as phonemes separate from /e, i, ɔ/ in Scottish Standard English. The further north a Scots dialect is from central Scotland, the more it will contain specific words that do not adhere to the rule.

- Vowel 8a, which only occurs stem-finally, and vowel 10 are always short; therefore, vowel 1 in its short form (according to the Rule), vowel 8a, and vowel 10 all merge as the diphthong /əi/. In its long form, the quality of vowel 1 changes, so it is here transcribed as /ai/ to reflect that.
- /ɪ/ and /ʌ/ (vowels 15 and 19) are usually short in all environments.
- In some Modern Scots varieties /a/ may merge with /ɔː/ in long environments. In Ulster Scots /ɛ/, /a/ and /ɔ/ are usually always long and the [əʉ] realisation of /ʌʉ/ is short before a voiceless consonant or before a sonorant followed by a voiceless consonant but long elsewhere.
- /i/, /e/, /o/, /ʉ/, /ø/, /ʌʉ/, and /jʉ/,(vowels 2, 4, 5, 6, 7, 13, and 14) are usually long in the following environments and short elsewhere:
  - In stressed syllables before voiced fricatives, namely /v, ð, z, ʒ/, and also before /r/. So in Scottish English, for example, save [seːv], doze [doːz], teethe [tiːð] and confusion [kənˈfjʉːʒən] have longer vowels than safe [sef], dose [dos], teeth [tiθ] and Confucian [kənˈfjʉʃən].
    - In some Modern Scots varieties, also before the monomorphemic end-stresses syllables /rd/, /r/ + any voiced consonant, /ɡ/ and /dʒ/.
    - In Shetland dialect the [d] realisation of underlying /ð/, usual in other Scots varieties, remains a long environment.
  - Before another vowel
  - Before a morpheme boundary, so for example feed (past tense of fee) [fiːd] is pronounced with a longer vowel than feed (verb or noun) [fid].
- /ɔː/ (vowel 12) usually occurs in all phonetic environments in final stressed syllables.

== History ==
The Scottish vowel length rule is assumed to have come into being between the early Middle Scots and late Middle Scots periods.
