= Ayrshire dialect =

Dialect of the Scots language

The Ayrshire dialect, also known as Ayrshire Scots, is a south-central dialect of the Scots language spoken in Ayrshire. It is notable for being the dialect spoken by Scottish poet Robert Burns.

== Samples ==
This is a poem by a P7 student, read by Ayshire poet Rab Wilson:

Plain soacks, fancy soacks,
Multi-coloured weans’ soacks.
Guid soacks, din soacks,
Fit for the bin soacks.

Haill soacks, torn soacks,
Cannae fin its neebor soacks.
Mither’s soacks, faither’s soacks,
Sisters’ and brithers’ soacks.

Nike soacks, umbro soacks,
Cacket wi muck soacks.
Soapy soacks, dreepin soacks,
Wavin fae the line soacks.

Holey soacks, schule soacks,
Rollin doon ma leg soacks.
Spottit soacks, strippit soacks,
Kept aside ma drawers soacks.

== See also ==
- Central Scots
- South Scots
