= Ulster language =

Ulster language or Ulster dialect may refer to:

- Ulster English
- Ulster Irish
- Ulster Scots dialect

== See also ==
- Ulster § Languages and dialects
