= The Coming of the Wee Malkies =

Scots poem by Stephen Mulrine

"The Coming of the Wee Malkies" is a Scots poem by Stephen Mulrine. It was popular with children in Scotland, where it was taught in schools and colleges as an example of poetry written in Glasgow dialect.
