= Modern Scots =

Varieties of Scots spoken since 1700

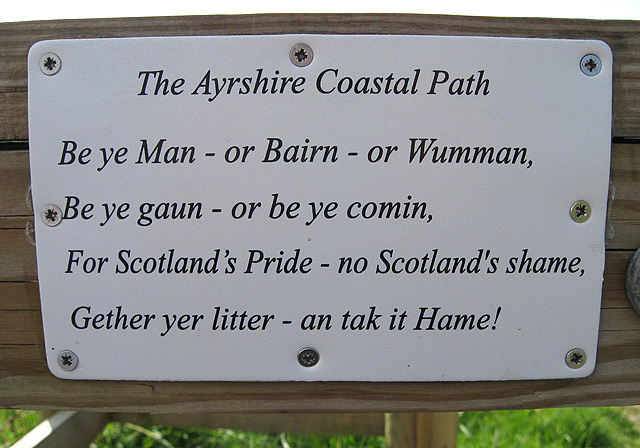
Anti-littering sign in Modern Scots on the Ayrshire Coastal Path

Modern Scots comprises the varieties of Scots traditionally spoken in Lowland Scotland and parts of Ulster, from 1700.

Throughout its history, Modern Scots has been undergoing a process of language attrition, whereby successive generations of speakers have adopted more and more features from English, largely from the colloquial register. This process of language contact or dialectisation under English has accelerated rapidly since widespread access to mass media in English, and increased population mobility became available after the Second World War. It has recently taken on the nature of wholesale language shift towards Scottish English, sometimes also termed language change, convergence or merger.

By the end of the twentieth century, Scots was at an advanced stage of language death over much of Lowland Scotland. Residual features of Scots are often simply regarded today as slang, especially by people from outwith Scotland, but even by many Scots.

== Dialects ==
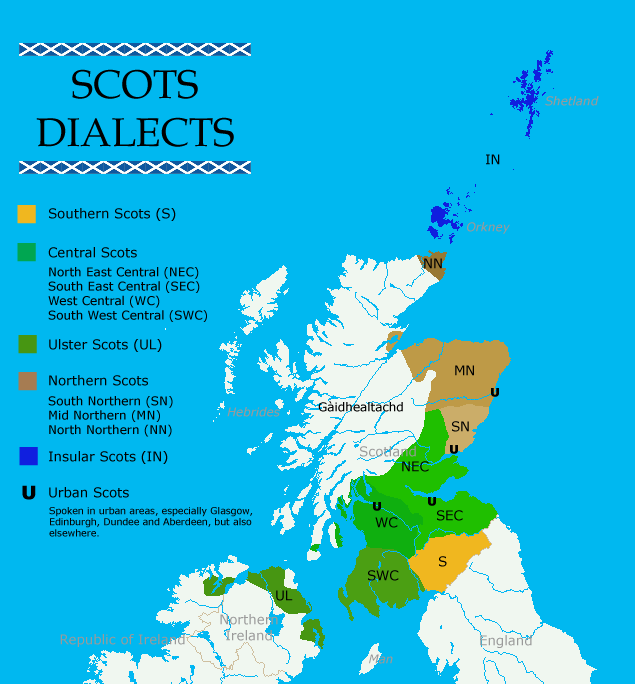
Map of Scots dialects

The varieties of Modern Scots are generally divided into five dialect groups:

- Insular Scots – spoken in Orkney and Shetland.
- Northern Scots – Spoken north of the Firth of Tay.
  - North Northern – spoken in Caithness, Easter Ross and the Black Isle.
  - Mid Northern (also called North East and popularly known as the Doric) – spoken in Moray, Buchan, Aberdeenshire and Nairn .
  - South Northern – spoken in east Angus and the Mearns.
- Central Scots – spoken in the Central Lowlands and South west Scotland.
  - North East Central – spoken north of the Forth, in south east Perthshire and west Angus.
  - South East Central – spoken in the Lothians, Peeblesshire and Berwickshire
  - West Central – spoken in Dunbartonshire, Lanarkshire, Renfrewshire, Inverclyde, Ayrshire, on the Isle of Bute and to the southern extremity of Kintyre.
  - South West Central – spoken in west Dumfriesshire, Kirkcudbrightshire and Wigtownshire.
- Southern Scots – spoken in mid and east Dumfriesshire and the Scottish Borders counties Selkirkshire and Roxburghshire, in particular the valleys of the Annan, the Esk, the Liddel Water, the Teviot and the Yarrow Water. It is also known as the "border tongue" or "border Scots".
- Ulster Scots – spoken primarily by the descendants of Scottish settlers in Ulster, particularly counties Antrim, Down and Donegal. Also known as "Ullans".

The southern extent of Scots may be identified by the range of a number of pronunciation features which set Scots apart from neighbouring English dialects. Like many languages across borders there is a dialect continuum between Scots and the Northumbrian dialect, both descending from early northern Middle English. The Scots pronunciation of come [kʌm] contrasts with [kʊm] in Northern English. The Scots realisation [kʌm] reaches as far south as the mouth of the north Esk in north Cumbria, crossing Cumbria and skirting the foot of the Cheviots before reaching the east coast at Bamburgh some 12 miles north of Alnwick. The Scots [x]–English [∅]/[f] cognate group (micht-might, eneuch-enough, etc.) can be found in a small portion of north Cumbria with the southern limit stretching from Bewcastle to Longtown and Gretna. The Scots pronunciation of wh as [ʍ] becomes English [w] south of Carlisle but remains in Northumberland, but Northumberland realises r as [ʁ], often called the burr, which is not a Scots realisation. The greater part of the valley of the Esk and the whole of Liddesdale have been considered to be northern English dialects by some, Scots by others. From the nineteenth century onwards influence from the South through education and increased mobility have caused Scots features to retreat northwards so that for all practical purposes the political and linguistic boundaries may be considered to coincide.

As well as the main dialects, Edinburgh, Dundee and Glasgow (see Glasgow patter) have local variations on an Anglicised form of Central Scots. In Aberdeen, Mid Northern Scots is spoken by a minority. Due to their being roughly near the border between the two dialects, places like Dundee and Perth can contain elements and influences of both Northern and Central Scots.

== Phonology ==
=== Consonants ===
		Labial	Dental	Alveolar	Post- alveolar	Palatal	Velar	Glottal
Nasal		m		n			ŋ	
Stop		p b		t (Note: /t/ may be /ʔ/ between vowels or word final.) (Note: In Ulster, dentalised pronunciations may also occur.) d	tʃ dʒ		k ɡ	ʔ
Fricative		f v	θ (Note: Initial /θ/ in thing, think and thank, etc. may be /h/ in central dialects.) ð (Note: In mid northern varieties an intervocallic /ð/ may be realised /d/.)	s z	ʃ ʒ	ç (Note: Allophone of /x/ after front vowels, especially /i/ and /ɪ/. May also be heard initially in heuk (/çjuk/), heuch (/çju/), and hoe (/çjʌu/).)	x (Note: Medial /xt/ may be /ð/ in Northern dialects.)	h
Approximant	median			ɹ		j	ʍ (Note: Older /xʍ/. Northern dialects also have /f/.) w (Note: The cluster wr may be realised /wr/, more often /r/, but may be /vr/ in northern dialects e.g. wrack ("wreck"), wrang ("wrong"), write, wrocht ("worked"), etc.)	
Approximant	lateral			l (Note: In many dialects /ɫ/ in most or all contexts.)				
Trill				r				

=== Vowels ===
Vowel length is usually conditioned by the Scottish Vowel Length Rule.

Aitken	IPA	Notes
1	short /əi/ long /aɪ/	
2	/i/	
3	/ei/	With the exception of North Northern dialects this vowel has generally merged with vowels 2, 4 or 8. In northern varieties the realisation may be /əi/ after /w/ and /ʍ/, and in the far north /əi/ may occur in all environments.
4	/e/	
5	/o/	
6	/u/	
7	/ø/	Merges with vowels 1 and 8 in central dialects and vowel 2 in northern dialects. /e/ in parts of Fife, Dundee and north Antrim. Usually /i/ in northern dialects, but /wi/ after /ɡ/ and /k/. Mid Down and Donegal dialects have /i/. In central and north Down dialects, merger with vowel 15 occurs when short and with vowel 8 when long.
8	/eː/	Always long in many varieties.
8a	/əi/	
9	/oe/	
10	/əi/	
11	/iː/	Always long in many varieties. Final vowel 11 may be /əi/ in Southern dialects.
12	/ɑː, ɔː/	Always long in many varieties.
13	/ʌu/	Vocalisation to /o/ may occur before /k/, especially in western and Ulster dialects.
14	/ju/	
15	/ɪ/	Always short. Often varies between /ɪ/ and /ʌ/ especially after 'w' and 'wh'. /ɪ̞/ (/æ̈/) occurs in much of Ulster except Donegal which usually has /ɛ̈/.
16	/ɛ/	
17	/ɑ, a/	Usually /ɑ/, often /ɑː/ in south west and Ulster dialects, but /aː/ in Northern dialects.
18	/ɔ/	Some mergers with vowel 5.
19	/ʌ/	Always short.

== Orthography ==
Words which differ only slightly in pronunciation from Scottish English are generally spelled as in English. Other words may be spelt the same but differ in pronunciation, for example: aunt, swap, want and wash with /a/, bull, full v. and pull with /ʌ/, bind, find and wind v., etc. with /ɪ/.

=== Alphabet ===
Letter	Details
A	Vowel 17
A	Vowel 4 in a(consonant)e. In Northern dialects the vowel in the cluster 'ane' is often /i/ and after /w/ and dark /l/ the realisation /əi/ may occur.
A	Vowel 12 for final a in awa (away), twa (two) and wha (who), but may also be /ɑː/, /ɔː/, /aː/ or /eː/ depending on dialect
A	The unstressed vowel /ə/
B	/b/
C	/k/ or /s/
D	/d/
D	Silent in word final nd and ld, but often pronounced in derived forms. Sometimes simply n and l or n and l e.g. auld (old) and haund (hand) etc.
E	Vowel 16. bed, het (heated), yett (gate), etc.
E	Vowel 2 in e(consonant)e
E	The unstressed vowel /ə/
F	/f/
G	/ɡ/ or /dʒ/
H	/h/
I	Vowel 15. E.g. big, fit (foot), wid (wood), etc.
I	Vowels 1, 8a and 10 in i(consonant)e
I	The unstressed vowel /ə/
J	/dʒ/
K	/k/
L	/l/
L	In many dialects /ɫ/ in all contexts; clear /l/ in Insular and Southern and certain Gaelic-influenced varieties initially, after front vowels and dental and labial consonants; clear in South West Central and Ross-shire in all contexts.
M	/m/
N	/n/
O	Vowel 18.
O	Vowel 5. Often spelled phonetically oa in dialect spellings such as boax (box), coarn (corn), Goad (God), joab (job) and oan (on) etc.
O	The unstressed vowel /ə/
P	/p/
Q	/k/
R	/r/ or /ɹ/ is pronounced in all positions, i.e. rhotically
S	/s/ or /z/
T	/t/
T	May be /ʔ/ between vowels or word final
T	Silent in medial cht ('ch' = /x/) and st, and before final en, e.g. fochten (fought), thristle (thistle) and also the 't' in aften (often) etc.
T	Silent in word final ct and pt, but often pronounced in derived forms e.g. respect and accept etc.
U	Vowel 19 but, cut, etc.
U	Vowel 7 occurs in u(consonant)e, especially before nasals, and sometimes for u alone
U	Vowel 6 in u(consonant)e in some words
U	The unstressed vowel /ə/
V	/v/
W	/w/
X	/ks/
Y	Vowels 1, 8a and 10 in y(consonant)e
Z	/z/
Z	/jɪ/ or /ŋ/, may occur in some words as a substitute for the older <ȝ> (yogh). For example: brulzie (broil), gaberlunzie (a beggar) and the names Menzies, Finzean, Culzean, Mackenzie etc. (As a result of the lack of education in Scots, Mackenzie is now generally pronounced with a /z/ following the perceived realisation of the written form, as more controversially is sometimes Menzies.)

=== Consonant digraphs ===
- ch:
  - Usually /x/. loch (fjord or lake), nicht (night), dochter (daughter), dreich (dreary), etc.
  - /tʃ/ word initial or where it follows 'r'. airch (arch), mairch (march), etc.
  - /ʃ/ usually where it follows 'n'. brainch (branch), dunch (push), etc.
- gh: /x/.
- gn: /n/. In Northern dialects /ɡn/ may occur.
- kn: /n/. In Northern dialects /kn/ or /tn/ may occur. knap (talk), knee, knowe (knoll), etc.
- ng: /ŋ/.
- sh: /ʃ/.
- th: /ð/ or /θ/. Initial 'th' in thing, think and thank, etc. may be /h/.
- wh: /ʍ/.
- wr: /wr/; more often realised as /r/ but may be /vr/ in Northern dialects: wrack (wreck), wrang (wrong), write, wrocht (worked), etc.

=== Vowel digraphs ===
- ae (generally in final positions): Vowel 4. Also occurs for vowel 7 in dae (do), tae (too) and shae (shoe). In Southern Scots and many central and Ulster varieties ae, ane and ance may be realised /jeː/, /jɪn/ and /jɪns/ often written yae, yin and yince in dialect writing.
- ai: Vowel 8 in initial and medial positions. Often /ɛ/ before /r/. The merger of vowel 8 with 4 has resulted in the digraph ai occurring in some words with vowel 4 and a(consonant)e occurring in some words with vowel 8, e.g. saip (soap), hale (whole), ane (one), ance (once), bane (bone), etc. and word final brae (slope) and day etc. Long vowel 7 is often written ai in dialect writing for central and north Down dialects.
- ay (generally in final positions): Vowel 8. Usually /e/ but /əi/ in ay (yes) and aye (always). In Dundee it is noticeably /ɛ/.
- au, aw: Vowel 12 in southern, central and Ulster dialects but /aː/ in northern dialects, with au usually occurring in medial positions and aw in final positions. Sometimes a or a' representing L-vocalisation. The digraph aa also occurs, especially in written representations of the (/aː/) realisation in northern and insular dialects. The cluster 'auld' may also be /ʌul/ in Ulster, e.g. aw (all), cauld (cold), braw (handsome), faw (fall), snaw (snow), etc.
- ea: Vowel 3. /ɛ/ may occur before /r/. meat (food), clear etc. Vowel 2/11 in a few words such as sea and tea.
- ee: Vowels 2 and 11. The realisation is generally /i(ː)/ but in Northern varieties may be /əi/ after /w/ and /ʍ/. ee (eye), een (eyes), steek (shut), here, etc. Often used for vowel 7 in dialect writing for northern dialects.
- ei: Vowel 3. deid (dead), heid (head), etc. Occasionally vowels 2 and 11, generally before ch (/x/), but also in a few other words, e.g. speir (enquire).
- eu: Vowel 7 before /k/ and /x/, see ui. /(j)u/ or /(j)ʌ/ depending on dialect. beuk (book), eneuch (enough), ceuk (cook), leuk (look), teuk (took) etc.
- ew: Vowel 14. In Northern dialects a root final 'ew' may be /jʌu/. few, new, etc.
- ey: Vowels 1, 8a and 10.
- ie: Vowels 2 and 11, generally occurring before l and v.
- oa: Vowel 5.
- oi, oy: Vowel 9.
- oo: Vowel 6, a 19th-century borrowing from Standard English. hoose (house), moose (mouse) etc. Vowel 7 also occurs from the spelling of Standard English cognates.
- ou: The general literary spelling of vowel 6. Occasionally vowel 13. Root final /ʌu/ may occur in southern dialects. cou (cow), broun (brown) etc.
- ow, owe (root final): Vowel 13. bowk (retch), bowe (bow), howe (hollow), knowe (knoll), cowp (overturn), yowe (ewe), etc.
- ui: The usual literary spelling of vowel 7 (except before /k/ and /x/, see eu). Also used for /u/ before /r/ in some areas e.g. fuird (ford). buird (board), buit (boot), cuit (ankle), fluir (floor), guid (good), schuil (school), etc. In central dialects uise v. and uiss n. (use) are [jeːz] and [jɪs].

=== History ===
As of 2022, there is no official standard orthography for modern Scots, but most words have generally accepted spellings.

During the 15th and 16th centuries, when Scots was a state language, the Makars had a loose spelling system separate from that of English. However, by the beginning of the 18th century, Scots was beginning to be regarded "as a rustic dialect of English, rather than a national language". Scots poet Allan Ramsay "embarked on large-scale anglicisation of Scots spelling". Successors of Ramsay—such as Robert Fergusson, Robert Burns and Sir Walter Scott—tended to follow his spelling ideas, and the general trend throughout the 18th and 19th centuries was to adopt further spellings from English, as it was the only accessible standard. Although descended from the Scots of the Makars, 18th–19th century Scots abandoned some of the more distinctive old Scots spellings for standard English ones; although from the rhymes it was clear that a Scots pronunciation was intended. Writers also began using the apologetic apostrophe, to mark "missing" English letters. For example, the older Scots spelling taen/tane (meaning "taken") became ta'en; even though the word had not been written or pronounced with a "k" for hundreds of years. 18th–19th century Scots drew on the King James Bible and was heavily influenced by the conventions of Augustan English poetry. All of this "had the unfortunate effect of suggesting that Broad Scots was not a separate language system, but rather a divergent or inferior form of English". This 'Scots of the book' or Standard Scots lacked neither "authority nor author". It was used throughout Lowland Scotland and Ulster, by writers such as Allan Ramsay, Robert Fergusson, Robert Burns, Sir Walter Scott, Charles Murray, David Herbison, James Orr, James Hogg and William Laidlaw among others. It is described in the 1921 Manual of Modern Scots.

By the end of the 19th century, Scots spelling "was in a state of confusion as a result of hundreds of years of piecemeal borrowing from English". Some writers created their own spelling systems to represent their own dialects, rather than following the pan-dialect conventions of modern literary Scots. The variety referred to as 'synthetic Scots' or Lallans shows the marked influence of Standard English in grammar and spelling. During the 20th century, with spoken Scots and knowledge of the literary tradition waning, phonetic (often humorous) spellings became more common.

In the second half of the 20th century a number of spelling reform proposals were presented. Commenting on this, John Corbett (2003: 260) writes that "devising a normative orthography for Scots has been one of the greatest linguistic hobbies of the past century". Most proposals entailed regularising the use of established 18th–19th century conventions and avoiding the 'apologetic apostrophe'. Other proposals sought to undo the influence of standard English conventions on Scots spelling, by reviving Middle Scots conventions or introducing new ones.

A step towards standardizing Scots spelling was taken at a meeting of the Makar's Club in Edinburgh in 1947, where the Scots Style Sheet was approved. J. K. Annand, Douglas Young, Robert Garioch, A. D. Mackie, Alexander Scott, Tom Scott and Sydney Goodsir Smith all followed the recommendations in the Style Sheet to some extent. Some of its suggestions are as follows:

- aa, baa, caa for words like aw, baw, caw – this was later discouraged
- -ie for final unstressed -y
- y for the /əi/ sound in words like wynd and mynd, and i for the short /ɪ/ sound in words like wind and find.
- ui for the /ø/ sound in words like guid
- ou for the /uː/ sound in words like nou and hou
- ow(e) for the /ʌu/ sound in words like growe and fowk
- throu and tho for through and though

In 1985, the Scots Language Society (SLS) published a set of spelling guidelines called "Recommendations for Writers in Scots". They represent a consensus view of writers in Scots at the time, following several years of debate and consultation involving Alexander Scott, Adam Jack Aitken, David Murison, Alastair Mackie and others. A developed version of the Style Sheet, it is based on the old spellings of the Makars but seeks to preserve the familiar appearance of written Scots. It includes all of the Style Sheet's suggestions, but recommends that writers return to the more traditional -aw, rather than -aa. Some of its other suggestions are as follows:

- ei for the /iː/ sound at the beginning or middle of words (eidiot, feinish, veisit), unless ee is firmly established (for example in wee and een)
- y for the /əi/ sound in words like wynd and mynd, but if it's at the beginning or end of a word use ey (eydent, stey, wey)
- eu for the sound in words like aneuch, speug, neuk
- -k for final -ct in words like object and expect (which become objek and expek)
- sk- for initial /sk/ (sclim→sklim, scrieve→skreive, scunner→skunner)
- -il for final unstressed -el and -le (muckle→mukkil, morsel→morsil, traivel→traivil)
- -ss for final /s/ (hoose→houss, moose→mouss, polis→poliss) unless -se follows a consonant (mense, merse)
- omit final -d where it is silent (staund→staun, thousand→thousan, friend→frein)

The SLS Recommendations says "it is desirable that there should be traditional precedents for the spellings employed and [...] writers aspiring to use Scots should not invent new spellings off the cuff". It prefers a number of more phonetic spellings that were commonly used by medieval Makars, such as: ar (are), byd, tym, wyf (bide, time, wife), cum, sum (come, some), eftir (after), evin (even), evir (ever), heir, neir (here, near), hir (her), ir (are), im (am), littil (little), sal (shall) speik (speak), thay (they), thaim (them), thair (their), thare (there), yit (yet), wad (would), war (were), wes (was), wul (will). David Purves's book A Scots Grammar has a list of over 2500 common Scots words spelt on the basis of the SLS Recommendations. Purves has also published dozens of poems using the spellings.

In 2000 the Scots Spelling Committee report was published in Lallans. Shortly after publication Caroline Macafee criticised some aspects of that, and some previous spelling suggestions, as "demolishing the kind-of-a standardisation that already existed where Scots spelling had become a free-for-all with the traditional model disparaged but no popular replacement", leading to more spelling variation, not less.

=== Language endangerment ===
The Scots language has had a long history of being devalued and marginalized in the Scottish education system.

Due to the Anglicisation of Scotland and the Education (Scotland) Act 1872, the education system required that every child learn English. This caused Scots to become forgotten about in main education and considered slang. As of 2022, it is deemed a vulnerable language.

=== Language revitalization ===
In 2012, the Scottish Government released a policy approach that highlights their aim to provide opportunities for children to learn languages other than their mother tongues. And in 2014, there was a dictionary app developed to help aid students in their learning of the Scots language.

The Curriculum for Excellence is the national curriculum for schools in Scotland, for students from aged 3–18. It was implemented in Scotland in 2010 and the initiative aimed to provide support for the incorporation of the Scots language learning in classrooms in Scotland.

There is still hesitancy in acknowledging Scots as a 'proper' language in Scotland, and many believe that it should not be taught in schools. Individuals are starting to understand the cultural impact that learning Scots has on young people, and want to encourage the use of the language in everyday conversations and help re-appropriate it as a traditional.

Along with the introduction of Scots learning in Scottish classrooms, publishing companies have translated popular books into Scots. Itchy Coo has issued Scots editions of Harry Potter, and The Gruffalo, and by doing this they have made Scots more accessible to children, teachers, and families.

== Grammar ==
Spelling variants
afternoon	eftirnuin
at times (whiles)	whyls
are; aren't	ar, are; arena, arna
anyone, anybody	oniebodie, onybody
anything	oniething, onything
anyhow, anyway	oniewey
anyhow	oniegate
beneath	anaith
beside	asyd
between	atwein/atweish
could; couldn't	coud, cud; coudna, cudna
eight, eighth	echt, echt
eleven, eleventh	eleivin, eleivint
everyone, everybody	awbodie, awbody
into	inti
nine, ninth	nyn, nynt
seven, seventh	seivin, seivint
should; shouldn't	shoud, shud; shoudna, shudna
will; won't	will, wul; winna, wunna

The spellings used below are those based on the prestigious literary conventions described above. Other spelling variants may be encountered in written Scots.

Not all of the following features are exclusive to Scots and may also occur in some varieties of English.

=== Definite article ===
The is used before the names of seasons, days of the week, many nouns, diseases, trades and occupations, sciences and academic subjects. It is also often used in place of the indefinite article and instead of a possessive pronoun: the hairst ('autumn'), the Wadensday ('Wednesday'), awa tae the kirk ("off to church"), the nou ("at the moment"), the day (today), the haingles ('influenza'), the Laitin ('Latin'), The deuk ett the bit breid ("The duck ate a piece of bread"), the wife ("my wife") etc.

=== Nouns ===
Nouns usually form their plural in -(e)s but some irregular plurals occur: ee/een ('eye'/'eyes'), cauf/caur ('calf'/'calves'), horse/horse ('horse'/'horses'), cou/kye ('cow'/'cows'), shae/shuin ('shoe'/'shoes'). Nouns of measure and quantity are unchanged in the plural: fower fit ("four feet"), twa mile ("two miles"), five pund (five pounds), three hunderwecht (three hundredweight). Regular plurals include laifs (loaves), leafs (leaves), shelfs (shelves) and wifes (wives).

=== Pronouns ===
==== Personal and possessive pronouns ====
English	Scots
I, me, myself, mine, my	A, me, masel, mines, ma
thou, thee, thyself, thine, thy (Early Modern English)	thoo/thee, thysel, thine, thy*
we, us, ourselves, ours, our	we, (h)us, oorsels/wirsels, oor/wir
you (singular), you (plural), yourself, yours, your	you/ye, you(se)/ye(se), yoursel/yersel
they, them, themselves, theirs, their	thay, thaim, thaimsels/thairsels, thairs, thair

The second person singular nominative thoo ([ðuː], Southern Scots [ðʌu], Shetland dialect [duː]) survived in colloquial speech until the mid 19th century in most of lowland Scotland. It has since been replaced by ye/you in most areas except in Insular Scots where thee ([ðiː], Shetland [diː]) is also used, in North Northern Scots and in some Southern Scots varieties. Thoo is used as the familiar form by parents speaking to children, elders to youngsters, or between friends or equals. The second person formal singular ye or you is used when speaking to a superior or when a youngster addresses an elder. The older second person singular possessive thy ([ðai]), and thee ([ði], Shetland [diː] along with thine(s) [dəin(z)]) still survive to some extent where thoo remains in use. See T–V distinction.

==== Relative pronoun ====
The relative pronoun is that ('at is an alternative form borrowed from Norse but can also be arrived at by contraction) for all persons and numbers, but may be left out Thare's no mony fowk (that) bides in that glen (There aren't many people who live in that glen). The anglicised forms wha, wham, whase 'who, whom, whose', and the older whilk 'which' are literary affectations; whilk is only used after a statement He said he'd tint it, whilk wis no whit we wantit tae hear (he said he'd lost it, which is not what we wanted to hear). The possessive is formed by adding 's or by using an appropriate pronoun The wifie that's hoose gat burnt (the woman whose house was burnt), the wumman that her dochter gat mairit (the woman whose daughter got married); the men that thair boat wis tint (the men whose boat was lost).

A third adjective/adverb yon/yonder, thon/thonder indicating something at some distance D'ye see yon/thon hoose ower yonder/thonder? Also thae (those) and thir (these), the plurals of that and this respectively.

In Northern Scots this and that are also used where "these" and "those" would be in Standard English.

==== Other pronouns ====
English	Scots
this, these	this, thir
that, those	that, thae
anyone	onybody
anything	onything
nothing	nocht
something	something
everybody	awbody
everything	awthing
both	baith
each	ilk
every	ilka
other	ither

=== Verbs ===
==== Modal verbs ====
The modal verbs mey (may), ocht tae/ocht ti (ought to), and sall (shall), are no longer used much in Scots but occurred historically and are still found in anglicised literary Scots. Can, shoud (should), and will are the preferred Scots forms. Scots employs double modal constructions He'll no can come the day (He won't be able to come today), A micht coud come the morn (I may be able to come tomorrow), A uised tae coud dae it, but no nou (I used to be able to do it, but not now). Do-support can be found in Modern Scots syntax, but is variable in frequency, and is likely to be a result of influence from English syntax.

Negation occurs by using the adverb no, in the North East nae, as in A'm no comin (I'm not coming), A'll no learn ye (I will not teach you), or by using the suffix -na sometimes spelled nae (pronounced variously /ə/, /ɪ/ or /e/ depending on dialect), as in A dinna ken (I don't know), Thay canna come (They can't come), We coudna hae telt him (We couldn't have told him), and A hivna seen her (I haven't seen her). The usage with no is preferred to that with -na with contractable auxiliary verbs like -ll for will, or in yes/no questions with any auxiliary He'll no come and Did he no come?

English	Scots
are, aren't	are, arena
can, can't	can, canna
could, couldn't	coud, coudna
dare, daren't	daur, daurna
did, didn't	did, didna
do, don't	dae, daena/dinna
had, hadn't	haed, haedna
have, haven't	hae, haena/hinna/hivna
might, mightn't	micht, michtna
must, mustn't	maun, maunna
need, needn't	need, needna
should, shouldn't	shoud, shoudna
was, wasn't	wis, wisna
were, weren't	war, warna
will, won't	will, winna
would, wouldn't	wad, wadna

==== Present tense of verbs ====
The present tense of verbs adhere to the Northern Subject Rule whereby verbs end in -s in all persons and numbers except when a single personal pronoun is next to the verb, Thay say he's ower wee, Thaim that says he's ower wee, Thir lassies says he's ower wee (They say he's too small), etc. Thay're comin an aw but Five o thaim's comin, The lassies? Thay'v went but Ma brakes haes went. Thaim that comes first is serred first (Those who come first are served first). The trees growes green in the simmer (The trees grow green in summer).

Wis 'was' may replace war 'were', but not conversely: You war/wis thare.

==== Past tense and past participle of verbs ====
The regular past form of the weak or regular verbs is -it, -t or -ed, according to the preceding consonant or vowel: The -ed ending may be written -'d if the e is 'silent'.

- -it appears after a stop consonant, e.g. hurtit (hurted), skelpit (smacked), mendit(mended), cuttit (cut), hurtit (hurt), keepit (kept), sleepit (slept);
- -t appears:
  - after an unstressed syllable ending in l, n, r, or ie/y, e.g. traivelt (travelled), festent (fastened), cairrit (carried);
  - after a voiceless fricative or affricate, e.g. raxt (reached), fasht (troubled), cocht (coughed), streetched (stretched, pronounced [stritʃt]);
  - in some irregular verbs, e.g. telt (told), kent (knew/known);
- -(e)d appears after a stressed syllable ending in a sonorant, a voiced fricative or affricate, or a vowel, e.g. cleaned/clean'd, speired (asked; but also speirt), scrieved/scriev'd (scribbled), wadged (wedged), dee'd (died).

Many verbs have (strong or irregular) forms which are distinctive from Standard English (two forms connected with ~ means that they are variants):

- bite/bate/bitten (bite/bit/bitten), drive/drave/driven~drien (drive/drove/driven), ride/rade/ridden (ride/rode/ridden), rive/rave/riven (rive/rived/riven), rise/rase/risen (rise/rose/risen), slide/slade/slidden (slide/slid/slid), slite/slate/slitten (slit/slit/slit), write/wrate/written (write/wrote/written), pronounced vrit/vrat/vrutten in Mid Northern Scots;
- bind/band/bund (bind/bound/bound), clim/clam/clum (climb/climbed/climbed), find/fand/fund (find/found/found), fling/flang/flung (fling/flung/flung), hing/hang/hung (hang/hung/hung), rin/ran/run (run/ran/run), spin/span/spun (spin/spun/spun), stick/stack/stuck (stick/stuck/stuck), drink/drank/drunk~drucken (drink/drank/drunk);
- creep/crap/cruppen (creep/crept/crept), greet/grat/grutten (weep/wept/wept), sweit/swat/swutten (sweat/sweat/sweat), weet/wat/watten (wet/wet/wet), pit/pat/pitten (put/put/put), sit/sat/sitten (sit/sat/sat), spit/spat/spitten~sputten (spit/spat/spat);
- brek~brak/brak/brakken~broken (break/broke/broken), get~git/gat/gotten (get/got/got[ten]), speak/spak/spoken (speak/spoke/spoken), fecht/focht/fochten (fight/fought/fought);
- beir/buir/born(e) (bear/bore/borne), sweir/swuir/sworn (swear/swore/sworne), teir/tuir/torn (tear/tore/torn), weir/wuir/worn (wear/wore/worn);
- cast/cuist/casten~cuisten (cast/cast/cast), lat/luit/latten~luitten (let/let/let), staund/stuid/stuiden (stand/stood/stood), fesh/fuish/feshen~fuishen (fetch/fetched),thrash/thrasht~thruish/thrasht~thruishen(thresh/threshed/threshed), wash/washt~wuish/washt~wuishen(wash/washed/washed);
- bake/bakit~beuk/bakken (bake/baked/baked), lauch/leuch/lauchen~leuchen (laugh/laughed/laughed), shak/sheuk/shakken~sheuken (shake/shook/shaken), tak/teuk/taen (take/took/taken);
- gae/gaed/gane (go/went/gone), gie/gied/gien (give/gave/given), hae/haed/haen (have/had/had);
- chuise/chuised/chosen (choose/chose/chosen), soum/soumed/soumed (swim/swam/swum), sell/selt~sauld/selt~sauld (sell/sold/sold), tell/telt~tauld/telt~tauld (tell/told/told).

==== Present participle ====
The present participle and gerund in are now usually /ən/ but may still be differentiated /ən/ and /in/ in Southern Scots and, /ən/ and /ɪn/ North Northern Scots.

=== Adverbs ===
Adverbs are usually of the same form as the verb root or adjective especially after verbs. Haein a real guid day (Having a really good day). She's awfu fauchelt (She's awfully tired).

Adverbs are also formed with -s, -lies, lins, gate(s)and wey(s) -wey, whiles (at times), mebbes (perhaps), brawlies (splendidly), geylies (pretty well), aiblins (perhaps), airselins (backwards), hauflins (partly), hidlins (secretly), maistlins (almost), awgates (always, everywhere), ilkagate (everywhere), onygate (anyhow), ilkawey (everywhere), onywey (anyhow, anywhere), endweys (straight ahead), whit wey (how, why).

=== Numbers ===
Ordinal numbers end mostly in t: seicont, fowert, fift, saxt— (second, fourth, fifth, sixth) etc., but note also first, thrid/third— (first, third).

English	Scots
one, first	ane/ae, first
two, second	twa, seicont
three, third	three, thrid/third
four, fourth	fower, fowert
five, fifth	five, fift
six, sixth	sax, saxt
seven, seventh	seiven, seivent
eight, eighth	aicht, aicht
nine, ninth	nine, nint
ten, tenth	ten, tent
eleven, eleventh	eleiven, eleivent
twelve, twelfth	twal, twalt

Ae /eː/, /jeː/ is used as an adjective before a noun such as : The Ae Hoose (The One House), Ae laddie an twa lassies (One boy and two girls). Ane is pronounced variously, depending on dialect, /en/, /jɪn/ in many Central and Southern varieties, /in/ in some Northern and Insular varieties, and /wan/, often written yin, een and wan in dialect writing.

The impersonal form of 'one' is a body as in A body can niver bide wi a body's sel (One can never live by oneself).

=== Prepositions ===
English	Scots
above, upper, topmost	abuin, buiner, buinmaist
below, lower, lowest	ablo, nether, blomaist
along	alang
about	aboot
about (concerning)	anent
across	athort
before	afore
behind	ahint
beneath	aneath
beside	aside
between	atween/atweesh
beyond	ayont
from	frae/fae
into	intae/intil

=== Interrogative words ===
English	Scots
who?	wha?
what?	whit?
when?	whan?
where?	whaur?
why?	why/how?
which?	whilk?
how?	hou?

In the North East, the 'wh' in the above words is pronounced /f/.

=== Syntax ===
Scots prefers the word order He turnt oot the licht to 'He turned the light out' and Gie's it (Give us it) to 'Give it to me'.

Certain verbs are often used progressively He wis thinkin he wad tell her, He wis wantin tae tell her.

Verbs of motion may be dropped before an adverb or adverbial phrase of motion A'm awa tae ma bed, That's me awa hame, A'll intae the hoose an see him.

==== Subordinate clauses ====
Verbless subordinate clauses introduced by an (and) express surprise or indignation. She haed tae walk the hale lenth o the road an her seiven month pregnant (She had to walk the whole length of the road—and she seven months pregnant). He telt me tae rin an me wi ma sair leg (He told me to run—and me with my sore leg).

=== Suffixes ===
- Negative na: /ɑ/, /ɪ/ or /e/ depending on dialect. Also nae or 'y' e.g. canna (can't), dinna (don't) and maunna (mustn't).
- fu (ful): /u/, /ɪ/, /ɑ/ or /e/ depending on dialect. Also 'fu'', 'fie', 'fy', 'fae' and 'fa'.
- The word ending ae: /ɑ/, /ɪ/ or /e/ depending on dialect. Also 'a', 'ow' or 'y', for example: arrae (arrow), barrae (barrow) and windae (window), etc.

==== Diminutives ====
Diminutives in -ie, burnie small burn (stream), feardie/feartie (frightened person, coward), gamie (gamekeeper), kiltie (kilted soldier), postie (postman), wifie (woman, also used in Geordie dialect), rhodie (rhododendron), and also in -ock, bittock (little bit), playock (toy, plaything), sourock (sorrel) and Northern –ag, bairnag (little), bairn (child, common in Geordie dialect), Cheordag (Geordie), -ockie, hooseockie (small house), wifeockie (little woman), both influenced by the Scottish Gaelic diminutive -ag (-óg in Irish Gaelic).

=== Times of day ===
English	Scots
morning	forenuin
midday	twal-oors
afternoon	efternuin
evening	forenicht
dusk, twilight	dayligaun, gloamin
midnight	midnicht
early morning	wee-oors

== Literature ==
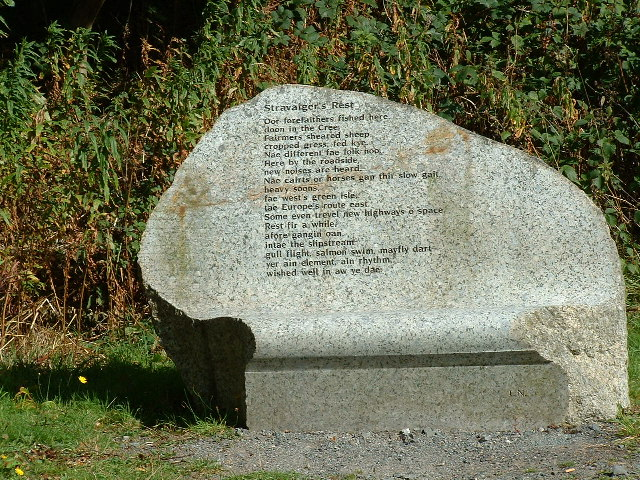
Stone seat by the River Cree, engraved with Modern Scots poem by Liz Niven

The eighteenth century Scots revival was initiated by writers such as Allan Ramsay and Robert Fergusson, and later continued by writers such as Robert Burns and Sir Walter Scott. Scott introduced vernacular dialogue to his novels. Other well-known authors like Robert Louis Stevenson, William Alexander, George MacDonald, J. M. Barrie and other members of the Kailyard school like Ian Maclaren also wrote in Scots or used it in dialogue, as did George Douglas Brown whose writing is regarded as a useful corrective to the more roseate presentations of the kailyard school.

In the Victorian era popular Scottish newspapers regularly included articles and commentary in the vernacular, often of unprecedented proportions.

In the early twentieth century, a renaissance in the use of Scots occurred, its most vocal figure being Hugh MacDiarmid whose benchmark poem A Drunk Man Looks at the Thistle (1926) did much to demonstrate the power of Scots as a modern idiom. Other contemporaries were Douglas Young, John Buchan, Sydney Goodsir Smith, Robert Garioch and Robert McLellan. The revival extended to verse and other literature.

William Wye Smith's New Testament translations appeared in 1901 and in 1904 in a new edition. In 1983 William Laughton Lorimer's translation of the New Testament from the original Greek was published.

=== Sample texts ===
From Hallow-Fair (Robert Fergusson 1750–1774)

At Hallowmas, whan nights grow lang,
And starnies shine fu' clear,
Whan fock, the nippin cauld to bang,
Their winter hap-warms wear,
Near Edinbrough a fair there hads,
I wat there's nane whase name is,
For strappin dames an sturdy lads,
And cap and stoup, mair famous
Than it that day.

Upo' the tap o' ilka lum
The sun bagan to keek,
And bad the trig made maidens come
A sightly joe to seek
At Hallow-fair, whare browsters rare
Keep gude ale on the gantries,
And dinna scrimp ye o' a skair
O' kebbucks frae their pantries,
Fu' saut that day.

From The Maker to Posterity (Robert Louis Stevenson 1850–1894)

Far 'yont amang the years to be
When a' we think, an' a' we see,
An' a' we luve, 's been dung ajee
By time's rouch shouther,
An' what was richt and wrang for me
Lies mangled throu'ther,

It's possible – it's hardly mair -
That some ane, ripin' after lear -
Some auld professor or young heir,
If still there's either -
May find an' read me, an' be sair
Perplexed, puir brither!

"What tongue does your auld bookie speak?"
He'll spier; an' I, his mou to steik:
"No bein' fit to write in Greek,
I write in Lallan,
Dear to my heart as the peat reek,
Auld as Tantallon.

"Few spak it then, an' noo there's nane.
My puir auld sangs lie a' their lane,
Their sense, that aince was braw an' plain,
Tint a'thegether,
Like runes upon a standin' stane
Amang the heather.

From The House with the Green Shutters (George Douglas Brown 1869–1902)

He was born the day the brig on the Fleckie Road gaed down, in the year o' the great flood; and since the great flood it's twelve year come Lammas. Rab Tosh o' Fleckie's wife was heavy-footed at the time, and Doctor Munn had been a' nicht wi' her, and when he came to Barbie Water in the morning it was roaring wide frae bank to brae; where the brig should have been there was naething but the swashing o' the yellow waves. Munn had to drive a' the way round to the Fechars brig, and in parts of the road, the water was so deep that it lapped his horse's bellyband.

A' this time Mistress Gourlay was skirling in her pains a praying to God she micht dee. Gourlay had been a great cronie o' Munn's, but he quarrelled him for being late; he had trysted him, ye see, for the occasion, and he had been twenty times at the yett to look for him-ye ken how little he would stomach that; he was ready to brust wi' anger. Munn, mad for the want o' sleep and wat to the bane, swüre back at him; and than Goulay wadna let him near his wife! Ye mind what an awful day it was; the thunder roared as if the heavens were tumbling on the world, and the lichtnin sent the trees daudin on the roads, and folk hid below their beds an prayed-they thocht it was the judgment! But Gourlay rammed his black stepper in the shafts and drave like the devil o' Hell to Skeighan Drone, where there was a young doctor. The lad was feared to come, but Gourlay swore by God that he should, and he gaired him. In a' the countryside, driving like his that day was never kenned or heard tell o'; they were back within the hour!

I saw them gallop up Main Street; lichtin struck the ground before them; the young doctor covered his face wi' his hands, and the horse nichered wi' fear an tried to wheel, but Gourlay stood up in the gig and lashed him on though the fire. It was thocht for lang that Mrs. Gourlay would die, and she was never the same woman after. Atweel aye, sirs. Gorlay has that morning's work to blame for the poor wife he has now.

From Embro to the Ploy (Robert Garioch 1909–1981)

The tartan tred wad gar ye lauch;
nae problem is owre teuch.
Your surname needna end in –och;
they'll cleik ye up the cleuch.
A puckle dollar bill will aye
preive Hiram Teufelsdröckh
a septary of Clan McKay
it's maybe richt eneuch,
verflüch!
in Embro to the ploy.

The Auld High Schule, whaur mony a skelp
of triple-tonguit tawse
has gien a heist-up and a help
towards Doctorates of Laws,
nou hears, for Ramsay's cantie rhyme,
loud pawmies of applause
frae folk that pey a pund a time
to sit on wudden raws
gey hard
in Embro to the ploy

The haly kirk's Assembly-haa
nou fairly coups the creel
wi Lindsay's Three Estatis, braw
devices of the Deil.
About our heids the satire stots
like hailstanes till we reel;
the bawrs are in auld-farrant Scots,
it's maybe jist as weill,
imphm,
in Embro to the ploy.

From The New Testament in Scots (William Laughton Lorimer 1885- 1967) Mathew:1:18ff

This is the storie o the birth o Jesus Christ. His mither Mary wis trystit til Joseph, but afore they war mairriet she wis fund tae be wi bairn bi the Halie Spírit. Her husband Joseph, honest man, hed nae mind tae affront her afore the warld an wis for brakkin aff their tryst hidlinweys; an sae he wis een ettlin tae dae, whan an angel o the Lord kythed til him in a draim an said til him, "Joseph, son o Dauvit, be nane feared tae tak Mary your trystit wife intil your hame; the bairn she is cairrein is o the Halie Spírit. She will beir a son, a the name ye ar tae gíe him is Jesus, for he will sauf his fowk frae their sins".

Aa this happent at the wurd spokken bi the Lord throu the Prophet micht be fulfilled: Behaud, the virgin wil bouk an beir a son, an they will caa his name Immanuel – that is, "God wi us".

Whan he hed waukit frae his sleep, Joseph did as the angel hed bidden him, an tuik his trystit wife hame wi him. But he bedditna wi her or she buir a son; an he caa'd the bairn Jesus.

== See also ==
Scots Wikipedia
