= Mid Ulster =

Mid Ulster can refer to:

- Central Ulster
- Mid Ulster (Assembly constituency)
- Mid Ulster (UK Parliament constituency)
- Mid Ulster (district)
- Mid Ulster English
