= Cromarty dialect =

Extinct dialect of Scots spoken in Cromarty

Cromarty
- Cromarty Scots
- Native to: Scotland
- Region: Cromarty
- Extinct: 2 October 2012, with the death of Bobby Hogg
- Language family: Indo-European: Germanic; West Germanic; Anglo-Frisian; Anglic; Cromarty

Language codes
- ISO 639-3: –
- Glottolog: None

The Cromarty dialect, sometimes called Cromarty Fisherfolk dialect, of North Northern Scots was spoken in Cromarty, Scotland. The dialect originated from people, especially fishermen, who moved north from the Firth of Forth in the 15th and 16th centuries. The last native speaker of the dialect, Bobby Hogg, died in 2012 at age 92.

The dialect had a heavy influence on both Highland English and Scottish Gaelic. The dialect was recorded by Am Baile (The Highland Council's culture division) so that if it were to die out it could still be read and studied.

== Phonology ==
In the Cromarty dialect, the initial sound of interrogative pronouns were dropped. For instance - What → at ("Ats theer trouble?" = "What's your trouble?").

== Vocabulary ==
The archaic second person pronouns thou, thee, thy, thine, and thyself were still in common in the dialect well into the 20th century.

== Resources ==
- Cromarty Fishertoun Dictionary, Cromarty Museum, Link
