= Orcadian dialect =

Dialect of Insular Scots

Orcadian
- Orkney Scots
- Scots
- Native to: United Kingdom
- Region: Orkney
- Ethnicity: Scottish people
- Language family: Indo-European: Germanic; West Germanic; North Sea Germanic; Anglo-Frisian; Anglic; Anglian; North Anglic; Scots; Insular Scots; Orcadian
- Early forms: Proto-Indo-European: Proto-Germanic; Proto-West Germanic; Proto-English; Northumbrian Old English; Early Scots; Middle Scots; Modern Scots

Language codes
- ISO 639-3: –
- Glottolog: orkn1236
- IETF: sco-u-sd-gbork

Orcadian dialect or Orcadian Scots is a dialect of Insular Scots spoken by Orcadians, itself a dialect of the Scots language. It is derived from Lowland Scots, with a degree of Norwegian influence from the Norn language.

Due to the influence of Orkney fur traders working for the Hudson's Bay Company in early Canada, a creole language called Bungi developed, with substratal influence from Scottish English, Orcadian Scots, Norn, Scottish Gaelic, French, Cree, and Saulteaux Ojibwe. As of 2013, Bungi is thought to have very few if any speakers and is potentially extinct.

In 2021, Orcadian poet Harry Josephine Giles released a science fiction verse novel, Deep Wheel Orcadia, in Orcadian Scots with parallel translation into standard English, described by their publisher as a "unique adventure in minority language poetry".

== Norn borrowings ==
Orcadian scots retains many borrowings from Norn:

- Rounded front vowels, as in Norwegian: bøker and Danish: by
- The use of a second person singular pronoun (thoo), linked to the Norwegian du and the Old Norse þu.
- The usage of /t/ for /θ/ and /d/ for /ð/ in words such as ‘father’ and ‘thing’.
- Perfective be construction: I’m dune this job twinty year.
- The Orcadian ‘singing tone’ shares features with the Norwegian and Swedish counterparts.
- The existence of a substantial number of Norse-derived vocabulary.

=== Grammatical gender ===
Weather is normally masculine (Noo he was a sooth-aesterly gale). Time is normally masculine (What time 'o day is he), as are tide (He was beginnan tae flow) and seasons (He was a bonnie spring day). Abstract concepts can be masculine, feminine or neuter. Countable nouns are more often feminine (a noticeable difference from the Shetland dialect), exceptions to this being whale head (m. whal'heid), stone (m. steen), and a few neuter nouns (nail, hide, powder horn, hood, staff and hand). Biological sex takes preference for animals.

== Sample Text ==
The following is the first paragraph of a traditional Orkney Folk tale The Selkie that deud no’ Forget:

Ae time langsine, Mansie Meur wus pickan’ lempeds i’ the ebb, on the wast side o’ Hackness i’ Sanday, whin he wus stunned tae hear some wey amang the rocks a unco’ ceurious soond. Sometimes hid was like a bothy i’ terrable pain, makin’ meen; an’ dan hid wad mak’ a lood soond like the root o’ a deean’ coo. An’ dan again de soond wad dee awa’ tae a laich an’ maist peetifu’ meen, as gin hid been a bothy ootmucht i’ a bought o’ the wark. The soond wus sae awfu’ peetifu’, hid meed Mansie think lang tae hear hid. Mansie could see naethin’ for a peerie while bit a muckle selkie closs in at the rocks, rakin’ his heed abeun de skreuf o’ the water, an’ leukan wi’ baith his een i’tae a geo a peerie bit awaí. An’ Mansie noticed that the selkie wus no f’aer’d, niver dookid, an’ niver teuk his e’e aff o’ that geo.

— Walter Traill Dennison, (1880)

== See also ==
- Bungi dialect – Moribund English dialect of Manitoba, Canada
- Shetland dialect – Language of Shetland
