= Northern Scots =

Group of dialects of Scots

Northern Scots refers to the dialects of Modern Scots traditionally spoken in eastern parts of the north of Scotland.

The dialect is generally divided into:

- North Northern, spoken in Caithness, Easter Ross and the Black Isle.
- Mid Northern, popularly known as the Doric, spoken in Aberdeenshire, Banff and Buchan, Moray and the Nairn.
- South Northern, spoken in eastern Angus and the Mearns.

South Northern Scots has had notably strong dialectical contact with the neighbouring North East Central Scots (Northeast Mid Scots).
