= Ulster English =

Variety of English spoken in Northern Ireland

- Northern Hiberno-English; Northern Irish English
- Native to: Ireland, United Kingdom
- Region: Ulster
- Language family: Indo-European: Germanic; West Germanic; North Sea Germanic; Anglo-Frisian; Anglic; English; Hiberno-English; Ulster English
- Writing system: Latin (English alphabet)

Language codes
- ISO 639-3: –
- Glottolog: None

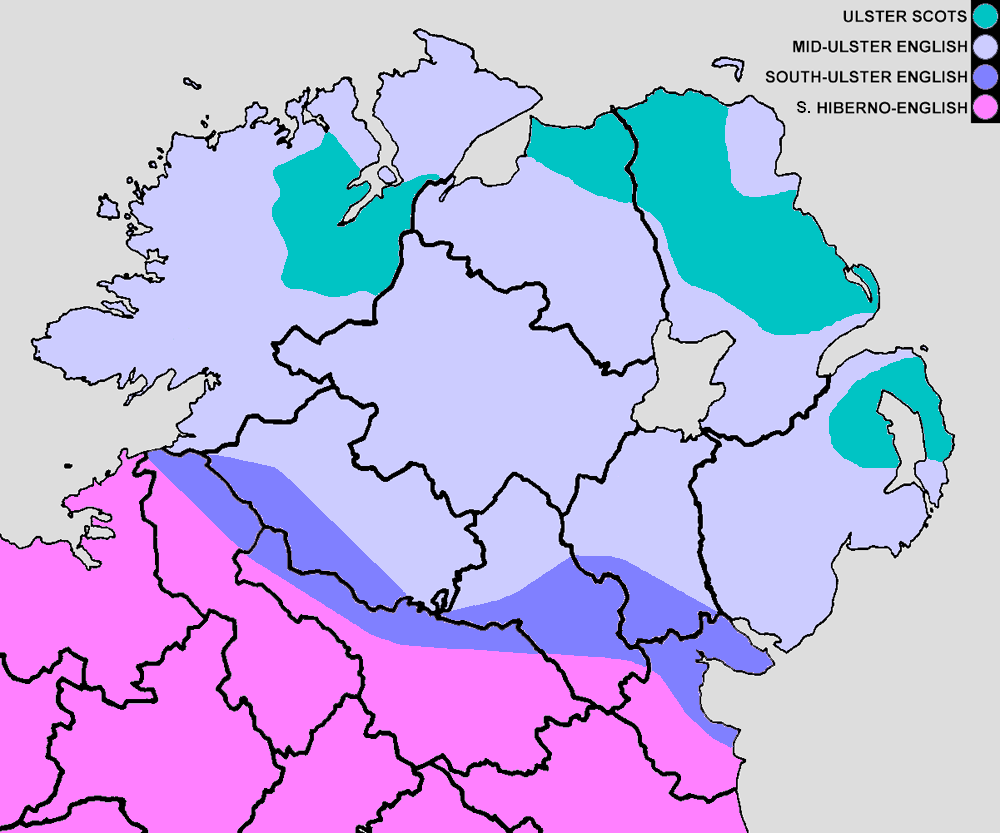
Approximate boundaries of the traditional Scots- and English-language areas in Ulster: Ulster Scots dialect, (Mid-)Ulster English, South-Ulster English (a transitional border variety), and Hiberno-English. Based on The Scotch-Irish Dialect Boundaries in Ulster (1972) by R. J. Gregg.

Pink represents Ulster counties within Northern Ireland; green within the Republic of Ireland.

Speech example
An example of a middle-class male from north County Down (David Trimble)

Speech example
An example of a male from Derry (Eamonn McCann)

Speech example
An example of a male from Belfast (George Best)

Ulster English (Irish: Béarla Uladh), also called Northern Hiberno-English or Northern Irish English, is the variety of English spoken mostly around the Irish province of Ulster and throughout Northern Ireland. The dialect has been influenced by the local Ulster dialect of the Scots language, brought over by Scottish settlers during the Plantation of Ulster and subsequent settlements throughout the 17th and 18th centuries. It also coexists alongside the Ulster dialect of the Irish (Gaelic) language, which also influenced the dialect.

The two major divisions of Ulster English are Mid-Ulster English, the most widespread variety, and Ulster Scots English, spoken in much of northern County Antrim along a continuum with the Scots language. South Ulster English is a geographically transitional dialect between Mid-Ulster English and English spoken south of Ulster, in the Republic of Ireland.

== Phonology ==
In general, Ulster English speakers' declarative sentences (with typical grammatical structure, i.e. non-topicalized statements) end with a rise in pitch, which is often heard by speakers of non-Ulster English as a question-like intonation pattern.

The following phonetics are represented using the International Phonetic Alphabet (IPA).

=== Vowels ===
In the following chart, "UE" refers to Ulster English, which includes Mid-Ulster English (which may incorporate older, more traditional Mid-Ulster English), as well as Ulster Scots (English). "SSIE" here refers to a mainstream, supraregional southern Hiberno-English, used in the chart for the sake of comparison.

English diaphoneme	UE	SSIE	Example words
/æ/	äˑ~a	æ~a	bath, trap, man
/ɑː/	ɑː~äˑ	aˑ~äˑ	blah, calm, father
conservative /ɒ/	ɒ~ɑ~ä	ä	bother, lot, top
divergent /ɒ/	ɒː (Mid-Ulster) ɔː (Ulster Scots) äː (traditional)	ɒː	cloth, loss, off
/ɔː/	ɒː (Mid-Ulster) ɔː (Ulster Scots) äː (traditional)	ɒː	all, bought, saw
/ɛ/	ɛ (Belfast: [ɛ̝ˑə])		dress, met, bread
/ə/	ə		about, syrup, arena
/ɪ/	ɪ̈~ë (Mid-Ulster) ə~ɘ (traditional) ɛ (Ulster Scots)	ɪ	hit, skim, tip
/iː/	iˑ (traditionally, [ɪi])	iˑ	beam, chic, fleet
/i/	e	i	happy, monkeys, sari
/ʌ/	ɞ~ʌ̈	ʊ~ʌ̈	bus, flood, young
/ʊ/	ʉ (Mid-Ulster) ʊ̈ (Ulster Scots)	ʊ	book, put, should
/uː/	ʉ (Mid-Ulster) ʊ̈ (Ulster Scots)	uː	food, glue, new
/aɪ/	äˑe~ɜi	aɪ~äɪ~ɑɪ	eye, five, try
/aɪ/	ɐi~ɜi	aɪ~äɪ~ɑɪ	bright, dice, site
/aʊ/	ɐʏ~ɜʉ	æʊ~ɛʊ	now, ouch, scout
/eɪ/	eː~ɪː (closed-syllabic [eˑə~ɪˑə])	eː	lame, rein, stain
/ɔɪ/	ɔɪ	ɒɪ	boy, choice, moist
/oʊ/	oː~oʊ	oʊ	goat, oh, show
R-coloured vowels
/ɑːr/	ɑˑɻ	ɑˑɹ~äˑɹ	barn, car, park
/ɪər/	iˑɚ	iˑɹ	fear, peer, tier
/ɛər/	ɛˑɚ (Belfast: [ɚˑ])	eˑɹ	bare, bear, there
/ɜːr/	ɚˑ~ɛˑɚ (Belfast: [ɚ]) Many rural accents have not undergone the merger of non-prevocalic historical /ɛr/ with /ɪr/ and /ʌr/ (though the latter two are always merged) that is found in most other varieties of English, so that words like earn and urn, for example, are not homophones.		fern, earn, serve
/ɜːr/	ɚˑ		fur, urn, fir
/ər/	ɚ		doctor, martyr, parker
/ɔːr/	ɔˑɚ	ɒˑɹ	for, horse, war
/ɔːr/	oˑɚ (rural: [ʉˑɚ])	oˑɹ	four, hoarse, wore
/ʊər/	øˑɚ	uˑɹ	moor, poor, tour

Other, less overarching features of some Ulster varieties include:

- Vowels have phonemic vowel length, with one set of lexically long and one of lexically short phonemes. This may be variously influenced by the Scots system. It is considerably less phonemic than Received Pronunciation, and in vernacular Belfast speech vowel length may vary depending on stress.
- /ɒ/ and /ɔː/ distinction in cot and body versus caught and bawdy is mostly preserved, except in Ulster Scots (which here follows Scottish speech) and traditional varieties.
- /e/ may occur in such words as beat, decent, leave, Jesus, etc., though this feature is recessive.
- Lagan Valley /ɛ/ before /k/ in take and make, etc.
- /ɛ/ before velars, as in sack, bag, and bang, etc.
- Merger of /a/–/aː/ in all monosyllables, e.g. Sam and psalm [ˈsaːm ~ ˈsɑːm] (the phonetic quality varies).
- /ʉ/ is possible in rural speech before /r/ in FORCE words like floor, whore, door, board, etc.
- Vowels are short before /p, t, tʃ, k/.
- Ulster Lengthening, which refers to the use of long allophones of /e, ɛ, a, ɔ/ in any single syllable word that is closed by a consonant other than /p, t, tʃ, k/.
- /uː/ is [yː] after /j/

=== Consonants ===
- Rhoticity, that is, retention of /r/ in all positions.
- /r/ is typically realised as a voiced retroflex approximant [ɻ]. Some rural speakers may allophonically use an alveolar tap [ɾ] when preceded by /t/, as in train.
- Palatalisation of /k, ɡ/ before /a/ is a recessive feature of rural speakers or older Catholic speakers in Belfast.
- /l/ is not vocalised, except historically; usually "clear" as in Southern Hiberno-English, with some exceptions.
- Unaspirated /p/, /k/ between vowels in words such as pepper and packet.
- Tapped [ɾ] for /t/ and /d/ between vowels in words such as butter and city. This is similar to North American and Australian English.
- Dental [t̪] and [d̪] for /t/ and /d/ before /r/ in words such as butter or dry. Dental realisations of /n, l/ may occur as well, e.g. dinner, pillar. This feature, shared with Southern Hiberno-English, has its origins in English and Scots.
- /ʍ/–/w/ contrast in which–witch. This feature is recessive, particularly in vernacular Belfast speech.
- Elision of /d/ in hand [ˈhɑːn], candle [ˈkanl] and old [ˈəʉl], etc.
- Elision of /b, ɡ/ in sing [ˈsɪŋ], thimble, finger etc.
- /θ/ and /ð/ for th.
- /x/ for gh is retained in proper names and a few dialect words or pronunciations, e.g. lough, trough and sheugh.

== Grammar derived from Irish ==
The morphology and syntax of Irish is quite different from that of English, and it has influenced both Northern and Southern Hiberno-English to some degree.

Irish has separate forms for the second person singular (tú) and the second person plural (sibh), ("thou" and "ye" respectively in archaic and some intimate, informal English). Ulster English mirrors Irish in that the singular "you" is distinguished from the plural "you". This is normally done by using the words yous, yousuns or yis. For example:

- "Are yous not finished yet?"
- "Did yousuns all go to see it?"
- "What are yis up to?"

Irish lacks words that directly translate as "yes" or "no", and instead repeats the verb in a question (positively or negatively) to answer. As such, Northern and Southern Hiberno-English use "yes" and "no" less frequently than other English dialects. For example:

- "Are you coming home soon?" "I am"
- "Is your computer working?" "It's not"

This is not necessarily true in Ulster English where "Aye" for yes and "Naw" for no are used, probably a Scottish influence.

The absence of the verb "have" in Irish has influenced some grammar. The concept of "have" is expressed in Irish by the construction ag ("at") mé ("me") to create agam ("at me"). Hence, Ulster English speakers sometimes use the verb "have" followed by "with me/on me". For example:

- "Do you have the book with you?" "I have it with me"
- "Do you have money for the bus on you?" "I have none on me"

== Vocabulary ==
Much non-standard vocabulary found in Ulster English and many meanings of Standard English words peculiar to the dialect come from Scots and Irish. Some examples are shown in the table below. Many of these are also used in Southern Hiberno-English, especially in the northern half of the island.

Ulster English	Standard English	Type	Notes
ach!, och!, ack!	annoyance, regret, etc.	interjection	Pronounced akh or okh. Usually used to replace "ah!" and "oh!". Ach is Irish for "but", and can be used in the same context. Och is Irish and Scottish Gaelic for "alas", and again can be used in the same context. Cf. German, Dutch, Frisian ach and English agh, German and Dutch have both ach and och.
aul, oul	old	adjective	Pronounced owl. From auld, an archaic form of old that is still used in Scots and Northern English dialects.
aye, auy	yes	adverb	Used throughout northern Ireland, Scotland and northern England. General Scots and dialect/archaic English, first attested 1575.
bake	mouth or face	noun	A different pronunciation and extended meaning of beak. Dutch bek or bakkes are used as rude words for mouth, too.
banjax	to break/ruin/destroy, a mess	verb noun	Used throughout Ireland; origin unknown.
bine, feg	cigarette	noun	Possibly from Woodbine (cigarette).
blade	girl	noun	Mainly used in Tyrone with different meanings depending on usage, but always refers to a female. "Look at thon blade" – "Look at that girl"; "Our blade" – "My sister/cousin" (Can also be used as a term of endearment in this form)
boak, boke	to retch/vomit, vomit	verb noun	From Scots bowk.
bog	wetland/toilet	noun	From Irish and Scottish Gaelic bogach meaning "wetland".
boggin/bogging	disgusting, ugly or otherwise generally unappealing.	adjective	Probably derived from bog (see above)
boreen	a narrow road/lane/track	noun	From Irish bóithrín meaning "small road".
bout ye?	how are you?	greeting	From the longer version "What about ye?" ("What about you?"), which is also used.
bru	unemployment benefits	noun	Pronounced broo. Shortened from welfare bureau.
cat-melodeon	awful	adjective	Probably a combination of cat and melodeon, referencing the sound of a screeching cat and badly-played melodeon tunes. The second part is pronounced mə-LOH-jin.
caul, coul	cold	adjective	Pronounced kowl. From Scots cauld meaning "cold".
carlin'	old woman	noun	From Norse kerling meaning "woman" (especially an old woman).
carnaptious	quarrelsome/irritable	adjective	From Scots.
claggerd	covered with something adhesive (usually dirt)	adjective	From Scots claggert meaning "besmeared".
cowp	to tip over/to fall over	verb	From Scots.
crack, craic	banter/fun/gossip/news (e.g. "What's the crack?)	noun	Crack is originally a Scots/Northern English word meaning something like "news", "gossip" or "fun". Originally spelt crack but the Gaelicized spelling craic started in the 1960s and is now common.
craitur, craytur	a term of endearment (e.g. "The poor craitur")	noun	From the Hiberno-English pronunciation of creature where ea is realised /e/ (see above) and -ture as archaic /tər/ rather than the standard affricate /tʃər/.
culchie	farmer/rural dweller	noun	Origin uncertain—either from Irish coillte meaning "woods"; from Irish cúl a' tí meaning "back of the house" (for it was common practise for country people to go in the back door of the house they were visiting); or from the -culture in "agriculture".
dander	walk	noun/verb	From Scots or Northern English.
dead-on	okay/no problem	interjection adjective	Origin uncertain.
drawk, drawky	to soak/drench, wet/showery	verb adjective	From Irish droch-aimsir meaning "bad weather" or "wet weather" or the less likely Scots draik/drawk.
eejit	idiot	noun	From the Hiberno-English and Scottish English pronunciation of idiot. Popularised in England to some extent by Terry Wogan.
feck	a mild form of fuck	interjection	Gained popularity following its frequent use in the 1990s comedy TV series Father Ted, and is more commonly found in Hiberno-English.
fella	man	noun	From English fellow; ultimately from Norse felagi.
footer, futer	fidget/waste time	verb	Via Scots fouter from Old French foutre. Perhaps from Irish fútar.
fernenst/forninst/fornenst	in front of/facing/against/opposite/beside	adjective	From Scots or Northern English.
founder, foundered	cold, to be cold	noun adjective	From Scots foundert/foondert/fundert which can mean "(to be) chilled".
geg, geggin'	joke, joking	noun/verb	From English gag.
glen	valley	noun	From Irish gleann.
gob, gub	mouth	noun	From Irish gob, which can mean "mouth".
grub	food		
gutties, guddies	running shoes	noun	From Scots, in which it is used to mean anything made of rubber. Note also the phrase "Give her the guttie" meaning "Step on it (accelerate)". Derived from Gutta-percha, a material which was widely used in the production of shoes from the 18th century.
hai, hey	an exclamation to call attention or to express pleasure, surprise, bewilderment, etc.	exclamation	Filler word used at the end of a sentence.
hallion	a good-for-nothing	noun	From Scots hallion meaning "rascal".
hesp	a scolding old woman	noun	Perhaps from Irish easpan. Cf. Scots hesper: a hard thing to do; a difficult person to get on with.
hoak, hoke	to search for/to forage (e.g. "Have a hoak for it")	verb	From Scots howk.
hooley	party	noun	Origin unknown; perhaps a variant of Irish céilí.
houl	hold	verb	Pronounced howl. From Scots/Northern English.
jap	to splatter; to splash; (of a frying pan) emit tiny 'sparks' of hot fat	verb	From Scots jaup.
jouk, juke	to dodge/to go	verb	From Scots jouk meaning "to dodge".
keen, keenin', keenin'	to lament/to wail, lamenting/wailing, shrill (in terms of sound)	verb noun adjective	From Irish caoin meaning "lament". Keening was a traditional practice done by woman at Irish funerals.
lock'a	an unspecified amount (e.g. "In a lock'a minutes")	determiner	From Irish loca meaning "a pile of" or "a wad of", or simply an extended meaning of "lock" as in "a lock of hair".
loch, lough	lake/sea inlet	noun	Pronounced lokh. From Irish loch.
lug	ear	noun	From Scots. Originally from Norse, used to mean "an appendage" (cf. Norwegian lugg meaning "a tuft of hair"). Used throughout Scotland & Ireland.
malarky, malarkey	nonsense	noun	Probably from Irish.
munya	great/lovely/attractive	adjective	Origin unknown.
oxter	armpit/under-arm	noun	From Scots. Dutch oksel = armpit
poke	ice-cream	noun	From Scots poke meaning "bag" or "pouch".
potcheen	hooch/bootleg alcohol	noun	From Irish poitín.
quare, kwer	very/considerable (e.g. "A quare distance")	adjective adverb	A different pronunciation and extended meaning of "queer". Used throughout Ireland.
scrawb	scratch/scrape	noun/verb	From Irish scráib. Cf. Northern English scrab and Dutch schrapen (to scrape).
scunner/scunder, scunnerd/scunderd	to annoy/embarrass, annoyed/embarrassed	verb adjective	From Scots scunner/scunnert meaning "offended" or "fed up".
sheuch, sheugh	a small shallow ditch (pronounced /ˈʃʌx/)	noun	From Scots sheuch.
skite, skitter, scoot	to move quickly	verb	From Norse skjuta meaning "to shoot" (cf. Norwegian skutla meaning "to glide quickly").
skite	to splatter with force	verb	From Norse skjuta.
slew	a great amount	noun	From Irish slua meaning "a crowd/multitude".
smidgen	a very small piece	noun	From Irish smidean.
snig	to snap-off/lop-off	verb	Origin unknown. Cf. Scots sneg < sneck.
stour	dust	noun	From Old French estour.
targe	a sharp-tongued woman	noun	From Scots
tae	tea	noun	Pronounced tay
tip	dump or dumpster	noun	
til	to	preposition	From Norse til.
the-day, the-night, the-marra	today, tonight, tomorrow	noun/adverb	From Scots the day, the nicht, the morra.
thon	that	adjective	From Scots; originally yon in archaic English, the th by analogy with this and that.
thonder	there (something distant but within sight)	adjective	From Scots; originally yonder in archaic English.
throughother	disorganised and careless	adjective	Probably from Irish. However, it has parallels in both Goidelic (e.g. Irish trína chéile) and Germanic (e.g. Scots throuither, Dutch doorelkaar, door-een, German durcheinander).
wee	little, but also used as a generic diminutive	adjective	From Middle English. Used throughout the north of Ireland and in Scotland.
weean, wean	child	noun	From Scots wee (small) + ane (one).
wheeker	excellent	adjective	From Scots wheech meaning "to snatch". Onomatopoeic.
wheen	a few/several	determiner	From Scots. Usually used in the phrase "a wheen of..."
whisht	be quiet (a command)	interjection	The Irish huist, meaning "be quiet", is an unlikely source since the word is known throughout England and Scotland where it derives from early Middle English whist (cf. Middle English hust and Scots wheesht).
wojus	awful/expression of surprise	adjective	Probably a variation of odious. Can also be used as an expression of surprise, usually to something negative. In this case it is most likely a shortened form of "Oh Jesus!"; Used throughout Ireland.
ye	you (singular)	pronoun	From Middle English ye, but pronounced with a short e sound.
yous, yousuns	you (plural)	pronoun	See grammar derived from Irish or Scottish Gaelic.

Furthermore, speakers of the dialect conjugate many verbs according to how they are formed in the most vernacular forms of Ulster Scots, e.g. driv instead of drove and driven as the past tense of drive, etc. (literary Scots drave, driven). Verbal syncretism is extremely widespread, as is the Northern subject rule.

== Mid-Ulster English ==
The speech in southern and western County Donegal, southern County Tyrone, southern County Londonderry, northern County Fermanagh, north County Armagh, southwestern County Antrim and most of County Down form a geographical band across the province from east to west. On the whole, these areas have much more in common with the Derry accent in the west than inner-city Belfast in the east. This accent is often claimed as being the "standard" Northern Irish dialect as it is the most widely used. Parts of the north of County Monaghan (an area centred on Monaghan Town and known as North Monaghan) would roughly fall into this category, but only to a certain extent. Bundoran, a town at the southern extremity of County Donegal, also has quite a western Ireland accent, as do parts of the south-west extremity of County Fermanagh.

=== Belfast and surroundings ===
The broad, working-class Belfast dialect is not limited to the city itself but also takes in neighbouring urban areas in the local vicinity (such as Lisburn, Carrickfergus and Newtownards), as well as towns whose inhabitants originally came from Belfast (such as Craigavon). It is generally perceived as being associated with economically disadvantaged areas, and with youth culture. This however is not the dialect used in the media (even those outlets which are based in Belfast). Features of the accent include several vowel shifts, including one from /æ/ to /ɛ/ before or after velars (/bɛɡ/ for bag). Nowadays, this shift largely only happens before /k/, so pack and peck are homophones as /pɛk/.

The Belfast dialect is now becoming more frequently heard in towns and villages whose inhabitants would have traditionally spoken with a distinctively rural accent. Examples of such areas are Moira, Ballyclare, Dromore and Ballynahinch. It could be said that many young people in these areas prefer to use the more cosmopolitan city accent, as opposed to the local variant that their parents or people in other areas would use.

Other phonological features include the following:

- Two major realisations of /e/ are to be encountered: in open syllables a long monophthong near [ɛː], but in closed syllables an ingliding diphthong, perhaps most typically [eə], but ranging from [ɛə] to [iə]. Thus days [dɛːz] and daze [deəz] are not homophonous.
- In Belfast, and in Mid- and South Ulster, the opposition between /ɔ/ and /ɒ/ is better maintained than in other parts of Ulster, though it is restricted to only a few environments, e.g., that of a following voiceless plosive. Thus stock [stɒk ~ stɑk ~ sta̠k] is distinct from stalk [stɔ(ː)k]. However, this is complicated by the fact that certain words belonging to the Standard Lexical Set THOUGHT have /ɒ/ rather than the expected /ɔ/. These typically include draw, fall, walk, and caught. Water often has /a/ (the TRAP vowel).
- The /aʊ/ phoneme is pronounced [əʉ] in most of Ulster, but in Belfast it is extremely variable and is a sensitive social marker. Pronunciations with a relatively front first element, [ɛ̈] or fronter, are working class. Middle class speakers prefer back [ɑ] or even [ɔ]. The second element is [ʉ ~ y ~ ɨ], often with little or no rounding. How and now may receive special treatment in working-class Belfast speech, with an open first element [a ~ ɑ] and a second element ranging over [i ~ ʉ], a retroflex approximant [ɻ], and zero, i.e., there may be no second element.

Some of the vocabulary used among young people in Ulster, such as the word "spide", is of Belfast origin.

=== Derry and surroundings ===
The accent of Derry City, which is also heard in northeastern County Donegal (including Inishowen), and northern and western County Tyrone (including Strabane). There is a higher incidence of palatalisation of the velar plosives /k/ and /ɡ/, (e.g. [kʲɑɹ] "kyar" for "car"). However, the most noticeable difference is perhaps the intonation, which is unique to the Derry, Letterkenny and Strabane area. The accent of the Finn Valley and especially The Laggan district (centred on the town of Raphoe), both in East Donegal, together with the accent of neighbouring West Tyrone and the accent of the westernmost parts of County Londonderry (not including Derry City), are also quite Scottish sounding. A variety of Ulster Scots is spoken in these areas. This West Ulster variety of Ulster Scots is considered to be quite similar to the Scots spoken in Ayrshire in south-west Scotland.

== Ulster Scots English ==
This region is heavily influenced by the historic presence of Scots and covers areas such as northern and eastern County Antrim, the Ards Peninsula in County Down, The Laggan district in County Donegal and northeastern County Londonderry. The strong Scots influence is noticeable in those districts and Scots pronunciations are often heard. People from here are often mistaken by outsiders as Scottish. This area includes the Glens of Antrim, where the last native Irish speakers of a dialect native to what is now Northern Ireland were to be found. It has been stated that, in the written form, Gaelic of this area continued to use standardised Irish forms, while the spoken dialect continued to use the Scottish variant, and was in effect not different from the Scots Gaelic of Argyll and Galloway.

In the 1830s, Ordnance Survey memoirs came to the following conclusion about the dialect of the inhabitants of Carnmoney, east Antrim: "Their accent is peculiarly, and among old people disagreeably, strong and broad." The BBC conducted a sociolinguistic survey of Ulster Scots grammar. East Donegal also has a strong Ulster Scots dialect (see below).

== South Ulster English ==
South Armagh, south Monaghan, south Fermanagh, south Donegal, and a small part of north Leitrim, and north Cavan natives speak their own distinct variety of English. Areas such as southern and western County Armagh, central and southern County Monaghan (known locally as South Monaghan), northern County Cavan and the southern 'strip' of County Fermanagh are the hinterland of the larger Mid-Ulster dialect. The accent gradually shifts from village to village, forming part of the dialect continuum between areas to the North and Midlands (as it once did in Gaelic). This accent is also used in north County Louth (located in Leinster) and in part of the northern 'strip' of County Leitrim (in Connacht). There are areas that show a mixture of accents with Ulster-English and Hiberno-English.

These areas fall along the east coastline. South Ulster English's phonology is markedly different from Ulster Scots and majority Ulster English in several aspects, including preservation of dichotomous pattern of phonemic vowel length seen in Middle English. Another feature of South Ulster English is the drop in pitch on stressed syllables. A prominent phonetic feature of South Ulster is the realisation of /t/ as a fricative with identical characteristics of the stop, i.e. an apico-alveolar fricative in weak positions.

== See also ==
- Ulster Scots
- Ulster Irish
- Languages of Ireland

== Bibliography ==
- Hickey, Raymond (2007). Irish English: History and Present-Day Forms. Cambridge University Press. ISBN 978-0521852999.
- Wells, J.C. (1982). Accents of English 2: The British Isles. Cambridge University Press 1986. ISBN 978-0521285407
