= Highland English =

Variety of Scottish English

- Highlander English
- English
- Native to: United Kingdom
- Region: Scottish Highlands
- Ethnicity: Scottish people
- Language family: Indo-European: Germanic; West Germanic; North Sea Germanic; Anglo-Frisian; Anglic; British English; Scottish English; Highland English
- Early forms: Proto-English: Old English; Middle English; Early Modern English

Official status
- Official language in: Scotland
- Regulated by: [[]]

Language codes
- ISO 639-3: –
- [[]]

Highland English is the variety of Scottish English spoken by many in Scottish Gaelic-speaking areas and the Hebrides. It is more strongly influenced by Gaelic than are other forms of Scottish English.

== Phonology ==
- The epenthesis ("helping vowel"), which is used in some consonant combinations in Scottish Gaelic and Modern Scots, is sometimes used in the Hebrides and so "film" may be pronounced "fillum".

== See also ==
- Modern Scots

Other English dialects influenced by Celtic languages

- Cornish English
- Manx English
- Bungi creole
- Glasgow English
- Hiberno-English
- Welsh English

== Sources ==
- Sabban, Annette (1982), Sprachkontakt: zur Variabilität des Englischen im gälischsprachigen Gebiet Schottlands; eine empirische Studie, Heidelberg: Groos.
- Watson, Murray (2003) Being English in Scotland. Edinburgh University Press. ISBN 0-7486-1859-7
