= A. J. Aitken =

Scottish lexicographer (1921–1998)

- Born: 19 July 1921; Edinburgh, Scotland
- Died: 11 February 1998 (aged 76); Edinburgh, Scotland
- Education: University of Edinburgh
- Known for: Aitken's law
- Scientific career
- Fields: Scots language, linguistics, lexicography
- Military career
- Allegiance: United Kingdom
- Branch: British Army
- Rank: Sergeant Major
- Unit: Royal Artillery
- Conflicts: World War II; Normandy landings; Operation Epsom; Battle of Villers-Bocage; North African campaign; Allied invasion of Sicily

Adam Jack Aitken (19 June 1921 – 11 February 1998) was a Scottish lexicographer and leading scholar of the Scots language.

== Education and military service ==
Aitken was born on 19 June 1921 in Edinburgh, grew up in Bonnyrigg, Midlothian, and was educated at Lasswade High School. He was the only son and eldest of the three children of Adam Aitken, a miner, and his first wife Alexandrina Sutherland, who died when Jack was about nine. He suffered neglect as a step-child, but his minister, Rev. Oliver Dryer, helped him to leave home at the age of sixteen. He was able to continue his education thanks to a school bursary. As the son of a miner, he received further bursaries that allowed him to enter the University of Edinburgh in 1939.

He served as a lance bombardier in the Royal Artillery during World War II in North Africa and Sicily. He took part in the Normandy landings landing at Port en Bessin D Day + 2, he drove to join 151 Brigade of the 50th Division beyond Bayeuk. He fought at Tilly-sur-Seulles and Villers-Bocage. He was commended for bravery by Field Marshal Montgomery in 1944 during the campaign in France. He rose to the rank of Sergeant Major.

== Dictionary of the Older Scottish Tongue ==
He graduated MA with First Class Honours in English Language and Literature in 1947. In 1948 he was appointed Assistant to Sir William Craigie, the editor of the Dictionary of the Older Scottish Tongue (DOST) and became editor of DOST on Craigie's retirement in 1956. When he took over editorial responsibility for DOST, Aitken instituted a new reading programme that approximately doubled the list of works excerpted for the dictionary, correcting the bias towards verse and literary prose. Aitken's editorship began with the letter J, and the impact of the new reading programme is seen from the third volume onwards.

Aitken was one of the first to appreciate the potential of the computer for research in the Arts. Although computer methods arrived too late to be of central importance in the collection process for DOST, he set up, with Paul Bratley and Neil Hamilton-Smith, the Older Scots Textual Archive, a computer-readable archive of over one million words of Older Scots literature.

For most of his career, up to 1979, Aitken combined his work on DOST with teaching, as a Lecturer and latterly Reader in the Department of English Language, University of Edinburgh. He can be said to have created 'Scots language' as a university subject. The handouts that he produced in the 1950s for his courses on Scots language were for many years the only clear summaries of Scots vocabulary, phonology, orthography, grammar and stylistics, and they circulated widely amongst scholars. Over time he made much of this material available in print, and his writings largely form the foundation of the subject.

== Honours ==
He was chairman of the Language Committee of the Association for Scottish Literary Studies 1971–1976; chairman of the Forum for Research on the Languages of Scotland 1978–1981 and honorary president from 1994; vice-president of the Scottish Text Society from 1985; Honorary Preses of the Scots Language Society from 1994; honorary vice-president of the Scottish National Dictionary Association from 1995; and honorary vice-president of the Robert Henryson Society from 1996. In 1981 the British Academy awarded him the Biennial Sir Israel Gollancz Prize. In 1983 he was awarded a DLitt by the University of Edinburgh, and was appointed honorary professor in 1984. In 1987, he was presented with a Festschrift: The Nuttis Schell, Essays on the Scots Language presented to A J Aitken.

Aitken is well known for his formulation of the Scottish vowel length rule, also known as Aitken's law. He also developed a numbering system for the Scots vowels that enabled a better understanding and description of their historical development.

== Death ==
He retired in 1986 and died on 11 February 1998 of ischaemia.
