= North Northern Scots =

Group of dialects of Scots

North Northern Scots is a group of Scots dialects spoken in Caithness, the Black Isle and Easter Ross.

== Caithness ==
The dialect of Caithness is generally spoken in the lowlying land to the east of a line drawn from Clyth Ness to some 4 miles west of Thurso. The Caithness varieties have been influenced by Norn. The dialect spoken in the neighbourhood of John o' Groats resembles that of Orkney to some extent. It is a fallacy to say Gaelic was a regularly spoken language, it was in fact only spoken by Lowlanders coming North for the herring gutting.

=== Phonology ===
The phonology of the Caithness varieties generally follows the pattern of the Mid Northern Scots varieties but:

- Initial j or g, which is realised /dʒ/ in most other Scots dialects, may be realised /tʃ/.
- The k in the cluster kn may be pronounced in for example, knife and knowe (knoll).
- th, usually /ð/ or /θ/ in other Scots dialect, may be realised /f/ in a few words, for example muith (sultry) and thresh. The initial th dropped in all pronominals, for example the, they (thay) and thare (there) etc.
- The w in the cluster wr may be realised /v/ in Canisbay, in for example wrack (wreck) and wrang (wrong).
- ai (vowel 8) in initial and medial positions and a(consonant)e (vowel 4), usually /e(ː)/, may be realised /əi/ in, for example, alane (alone), ane (one), ance (once), bane (bone), hail (whole), hairse (hoarse), hame (home), kail (kale), kaim (comb), stane (stone) and wame (belly).
- au (vowel 12) may be realised /ʌu/ rather than /aː/ before ld in, for example Bauld (bold), cauld (cold) and sauld (sold).
- ea, ei (vowel 3) may be realised /əi/ rather than /i(ː)/ or /e(ː)/ as in other Scots dialects, in for example, cheap, east, heid (head), heiven (heaven), leaf, peir (pear), seiven (seven), sheaf, speak, sweir (swear) and sweit (sweat).
- i(consonant)e, y(consonant)e (vowels 1 and 10 ) may be realised /oi/ in, for example, bide (remain), byke (wasps' nest), line and pipe.
- ui (vowel 7) is realised /i(ː)/ including after /ɡ/ and /k/. Also u(consonant)e, especially before nasals, and oo from the spelling of Standard English cognates, in for example, abuin (above), cuit (ankle) and guid (good), often written abeen, keet and geed in dialect writing. The realisation is usually /(j)uː/ before /r/ in, for example, buird (board), fluir (floor) and fuird (ford), often written boord, floor and foord in dialect writing. The realisation [i(ː)] also occurs in adae (ado), dae (do), shae (shoe) and tae (to~too).

=== Grammar ===
The grammar generally follows that of other Scots dialects, but:

The past tense and past participles -it an t are realised /ɪd/ and /d/ in, for example, hurtit, skelpit (smacked), mendit, traivelt (travelled), raxt (reached), telt (told) and kent (knew/known).

The diminutive -ock is realised /əɡ/ influenced by or borrowed from Gaelic. A final -ock in other words may also be realised /əɡ/. Often written -ag in dialect writing.

The present participle and gerund -in may be differentiated /ən/ and /ɪn/, for example: He wis aye gutteran aboot and He's fond o gutterin aboot.

== Black Isle and Easter Ross ==
Contact with Mid Northern Scots via fishermen from the Moray Firth and modern education has influenced the Black Isle varieties to some extent. Avoch was originally Gaelic speaking but was settled by Scots-speakers, especially fisher folk, in the 17th century. More recently there has been a shift to Highland English. The traditional Black Isle dialect of Cromarty became extinct in October 2012, upon the death of the last native speaker, Bobby Hogg.

=== Phonology ===
The phonology of the Black Isle and Easter Ross varieties generally follow the pattern of the Caithness varieties but:

- Initial ch, usually realised /tʃ/ in other Scots dialects, may be realised /ʃ/ in, for example, chap (knock), chield (fellow), chirl (chirp) and chowk (cheek).
- Initial h may be 'dropped' in, for example, haund (hand) and hoose (house) but 'added' in for example in ale and Annie.
- wh may be dropped or realised /h/ in the pronominals wha (who), whit (what), whase (whose), whan (when) and whaur (where). The realisation may also be /f/ as in Mid Northern Scots and in Cromarty the realisation may be /w/.
