= Insular Scots =

Varieties of Lowland Scots influenced by Norn

- Native to: Scotland
- Region: Shetland and Orkney
- Language family: Indo-European: Germanic; West Germanic; North Sea Germanic; Anglo-Frisian; Anglic; Anglian; North Anglic; Scots; Insular Scots
- Dialects: Shaetlan; Orcadian

Language codes
- ISO 639-3: –
- Glottolog: insu1251
- Linguasphere: 52-ABA-aad,

Insular Scots comprises varieties of Lowland Scots generally subdivided into:

- Shetland dialect
- Orcadian dialect

Both dialects share much Norn vocabulary, Shetland dialect more so, than does any other Scots dialect, perhaps because they were both under strong Norwegian influence in their recent past. In ancient times, Pictish was spoken in the islands. With Viking settlement of the islands came the establishment of Norn-speaking communities. Although the islands thereafter owed allegiance to Norway, they became politically involved with Scotland. Scotland then annexed the islands in 1472, after which Scots replaced Norwegian as the dominant language.

It should not be confused with the vernacular of the Islands of the Clyde.

Insular Scots orthography can sometimes include ö and ü including very rarely ø.

== Pronunciation ==
- The old front rounded vowel /θ/ remains (written as ui, u-e or as ö)
- Voiced and voiceless dental fricatives are stopped - “blithe” is pronounced blide, “earth” is pronounced eart.
- /hw/ and /kw/ are merged, mostly into /kw/ but on south mainland they merge to /hw/, and are sometimes interchangeable.

== Grammar ==
- thou/the/thy is used alongside the formal du/de/dy.
- Use of gendered pronouns in certain cases: He was blaain a gale).
- Perfective be over have: I’m walked a piece the day.
- Questions can be formed by simple inversion (as an alternative to the use of the auxiliary): Whit tinks du?
- Use of the reflexive: A’ll geng an rest me whin a’m pitten da bairns ta da scöl.
