= Glasgow dialect =

Scots variety spoken in and around Glasgow, Scotland

- Glaswegian
- Native to: Scotland
- Region: Greater Glasgow
- Ethnicity: Scottish people
- Native speakers: (undated figure of Unknown, likely up to 1,000,000 (see: Glasgow))
- Language family: Indo-European: Germanic; West Germanic; North Sea Germanic; Anglo-Frisian; Anglic; English; British English; Scottish English; Glasgow dialect
- Early forms: Old English: Middle English
- Writing system: Latin

Language codes
- ISO 639-3: –
- IETF: sco-u-sd-gbglg, en-scotland-u-sd-gbglg

The Glasgow dialect, also called Glaswegian or Glasgow patter, is a dialect or language variety spoken in and around Glasgow, Scotland. It is most common in working class people, which has led to stigma from members of other classes and those outside Glasgow.

Glaswegian varies from Scottish English at one end of a bipolar linguistic continuum to the local dialect of West Central Scots at the other. Therefore, the speech of many Glaswegians can draw on a "continuum between fully localised and fully standardised". Additionally, the Glasgow dialect has Highland English and Hiberno-English influences owing to the speech of Highlanders and Irish people who migrated in large numbers to the Glasgow area in the 19th and early 20th centuries. While being named for Glasgow, the accent is typical for natives across the full Greater Glasgow area and associated counties such as Lanarkshire, Renfrewshire, Dunbartonshire and parts of Ayrshire, which formerly came under the single authority of Strathclyde.

As with other dialects, it is subject to dialect levelling where particularly Scots vocabulary is replaced by Standard English words and, in particular, words largely from colloquial English. However, Glaswegians continue to create new euphemisms and nicknames for well-known local figures and buildings.

== Literature ==
The Glasgow vernacular has also established itself in Scottish literature. Many authors spell some of the Scots elements phonetically, often coinciding with common spelling errors, rather than using the prestigious Modern Scots conventions. The general effect of that, particularly its comic forms, is to exaggerate the unintelligibility of Glasgow speech to outsiders. The resulting orthographic representation of the vernacular gives the overall impression of an anti-standard rather than a local standard.

Michael Munro wrote a guide to Glaswegian entitled The Patter, first published in 1985. With illustrations by David Neilson, and later by the Paisley-born artist and playwright John Byrne, the book was followed by The Patter – Another Blast in 1988, with The Complete Patter, an updated compendium of the first and second books, being published in 1996.

James Kelman's 1994 novel How Late It Was, How Late is written largely in Glaswegian dialect from the point of view of Sammy Samuels, a 38-year-old ex-convict who wakes up blind after a drinking binge and a fight with police. The novel won the 1994 Booker Prize.

Jamie Stuart, a Church of Scotland elder from the High Carntyne Church, produced "A Glasgow Bible" in 1997, relating some biblical tales in the Glaswegian vernacular. More recently, in 2014 Alice's Adventures in Wonderland was translated into Glaswegian Scots by Thomas Clark as Alice's Adventirs in Wunnerlaun.

A 2020 Graeme Armstrong novel, The Young Team, narrated by a gang member in the local dialect, focuses on the 'ned culture' of the region in the early 21st century (albeit set in Airdrie, North Lanarkshire a few miles east of Glasgow rather than in the city itself). Armstrong, who had been inspired by the style used by Irvine Welsh for Trainspotting – written in the similar but distinct accent of Edinburgh – struggled to have his novel published and was advised to mitigate the use of the dialect to appeal to a wider audience, but refused to compromise the authenticity of the characters' voices.

== Phonology ==
Jane Stuart-Smith defined two varieties for descriptive purposes in a chapter of the 1999 book Urban Voices entitled "Glasgow: accent and voice quality":

- Glasgow Standard English (GSE), the Glaswegian form of Scottish English, spoken by most middle-class speakers
- Glasgow vernacular (GV), the dialect of many working-class speakers, which is historically based on West-Central Scots, but which shows strong influences from Irish English, its own distinctive slang and increased levelling towards GSE

Differences between the two systems are mostly in lexical incidence. Many working-class speakers use the GSE system when reading aloud, albeit with different qualities for the vowels. The table below shows the vowels used in both variants below:

IPA: Vowels

	Front	Central	Back
Close	i y	ɨ ʉ	ɯ u
Near-close	ɪ ʏ		ʊ
Close-mid	e ø	ɘ ɵ	ɤ o
Mid	e̞ ø̞	ə	ɤ̞ o̞
Open-mid	ɛ œ	ɜ ɞ	ʌ ɔ
Near-open	æ	ɐ
Open	a ɶ	ä	ɑ ɒ

- IPA help
- audio help
- full chart
- template

Legend: unrounded • rounded

Traditional lexical set	Lexical set	GSE	GV
CLOTH	OFF	ɔ	a̠
CLOTH	CLOTH	ɔ	o
LOT		ɔ	o
THOUGHT		ɔ	o
NORTH		ɔ	o
GOAT		o	o
FORCE	FORCE	o	o
FORCE	MORE	o	e
FACE	FACE	e	e
FACE	STAY	e	e ~ ʌi
SQUARE		e	ɛ ~ e
happY		e	e ~ ɪ̈
FOOT		ʉ	ɪ̈ ~ ɪ
MOUTH		ʌʉ	ʉ
GOOSE	GOOSE	ʉ	ʉ
GOOSE	DO	ʉ	e
START		a̠	e
TRAP	STAND	a̠	ɔ
TRAP	TRAP	a̠	a̠
PALM		a̠	a̠
BATH	BATH	a̠	a̠
BATH	AFTER	a̠	ɛ
DRESS	DRESS	ɛ	ɛ
DRESS	HEAD	ɛ	i
DRESS	NEVER	ɛ ~ ɛ̈	ɪ̈
NURSE	BERTH	ɛ	ɛ ~ ɪ
NURSE	BIRTH	ɪ	ɪ̈ ~ ʌ̈
NURSE	NURSE	ʌ̈	ʌ̈ ~ ɪ
STRUT		ʌ̈	ʌ̈
commA		ʌ̈	ʌ̈
lettER		ɪ̈ ~ ʌ̈	ʌ̈
horsES		ɪ	ɪ̈ ~ ʌ̈
KIT		ɪ	ɪ̈ ~ i
FLEECE		ï ~ i̠	i ~ i̠
CURE		jʉ	
PRICE	PRICE	ʌi	
PRICE	PRIZE	ae	
CHOICE		ɔe	
NEAR		i	

Stuart-Smith (1999) describes notable features of consonants that distinguish the Glasgow dialect from other dialects.

- T-glottalization is "strongly stigmatized yet extremely common". Glottalization also occurs of /k/ and /p/, albeit less frequently.
- /d/ and /t/ can be pronounced with dentalisation. /d/ is sometimes omitted at the end of a word (e.g. old, stand).
- Th-fronting occurs with some younger speakers.
- /x/ is used in words such as loch, although this is dying out amongst younger speakers.
- /ʍ/ is used in words beginning "wh" (e.g. whine).
- There is no H-dropping except in unstressed cases of him and her.
- Yod-dropping only occurs after /l/ or /s/.
- Most Glasgow speech is rhotic, but non-rhoticity can be found amongst some younger working-class speakers. The realisation of /r/ can be [ɹ], [ɻ] or [r].
- /l/ is a dark l [ɫ] in almost all positions.

== In the media ==
In the 1970s, the Glasgow-born comedian Stanley Baxter parodied the patter on his television sketch show. "Parliamo Glasgow" was a spoof programme in which Baxter played a language coach and various scenarios using Glaswegian dialogue were played out for laughs. Popular television comedies using the dialect include Rab C. Nesbitt, Chewin' the Fat, Still Game, Burnistoun and Limmy's Show.

The 1998 film by Ken Loach, My Name is Joe, is one of the few films recorded [almost] entirely in Glasgow dialect. As a result, the film had to be given subtitles when released in the United States and even for audiences in England. The same situation occurred with another Loach film, 2002's Sweet Sixteen, based in the town of Greenock which has a local accent virtually identical to that of Glasgow, and with the 2010 release Neds set in the city.

== Alleged influence from Cockney ==
Studies have indicated that working-class adolescents in areas such as Glasgow have begun to use certain aspects of Cockney and other Anglicisms in their speech, infiltrating the traditional Glasgow speech. For example, th-fronting is commonly found, and typical Scottish features such as the post-vocalic /r/ are reduced, although this last feature is more likely to be a development of Central Belt Scots origin, unrelated to Anglo-English non-rhoticity. Researches suggest the use of English speech characteristics is likely to be consequential on the influence of London and south east England accents which feature prominently on television.

The linguist John C. Wells, a critic of the media reporting on Estuary English, has questioned whether Glasgow is being influenced by Cockney speech. He claimed that journalists had misrepresented the prevalence of th-fronting in Glasgow and that there is no evidence that th-fronting originated in London. He also wrote that all dialects change over time and that change does not mean that the Glasgow patter will disappear.

It has also been proposed that the adoption of th-fronting amongst Glaswegian youths may serve as a social identifier; usage of [θ] may be considered middle-class or "posh", so the adoption of alternatives [f] or the more traditional [h] projects a working-class, "tough" image, or a rejection of the establishment.
