= Scottish English =

Variety of English spoken in Scotland

- Native to: United Kingdom
- Region: Scotland
- Ethnicity: Scottish
- Language family: Indo-European: Germanic; West Germanic; Ingvaeonic; Anglo-Frisian; Anglic; English; Scottish English
- Early forms: Proto-Indo-European: Proto-Germanic; Old English; Middle English; Early Modern English
- Writing system: Latin (English alphabet); English Braille, Unified English Braille)

Language codes
- ISO 639-3: –
- IETF: en-scotland

Scottish English is the set of varieties of the English language spoken in Scotland. The transregional, standardised variety is called Scottish Standard English or Standard Scottish English (SSE). Scottish Standard English may be defined as "the characteristic speech of the professional class [in Scotland] and the accepted norm in schools". IETF language tag for "Scottish Standard English" is en-scotland.

In addition to distinct pronunciation, grammar and expressions, Scottish English has distinctive vocabulary, particularly pertaining to Scottish institutions such as the Church of Scotland, local government and the education and legal systems.

Scottish Standard English is one end of a bipolar linguistic continuum, with broad Scots at the other. Scottish English may be influenced to varying degrees by Scots. Many Scots speakers separate Scots and Scottish English as different registers depending on social circumstances, with Scottish English treated as the formal variety, and Scots as informal. Some speakers code switch clearly from one to the other while others style shift in a less predictable and more fluctuating manner.

== Background ==
Scottish English resulted from language contact between Scots and the Standard English of England after the 17th century. The resulting shifts to English usage by Scots-speakers resulted in many phonological compromises and lexical transfers, often mistaken for mergers by linguists unfamiliar with the history of Scottish English. Furthermore, the process was also influenced by interdialectal forms, hypercorrections and spelling pronunciations. (See the section on phonology below.)

== History ==
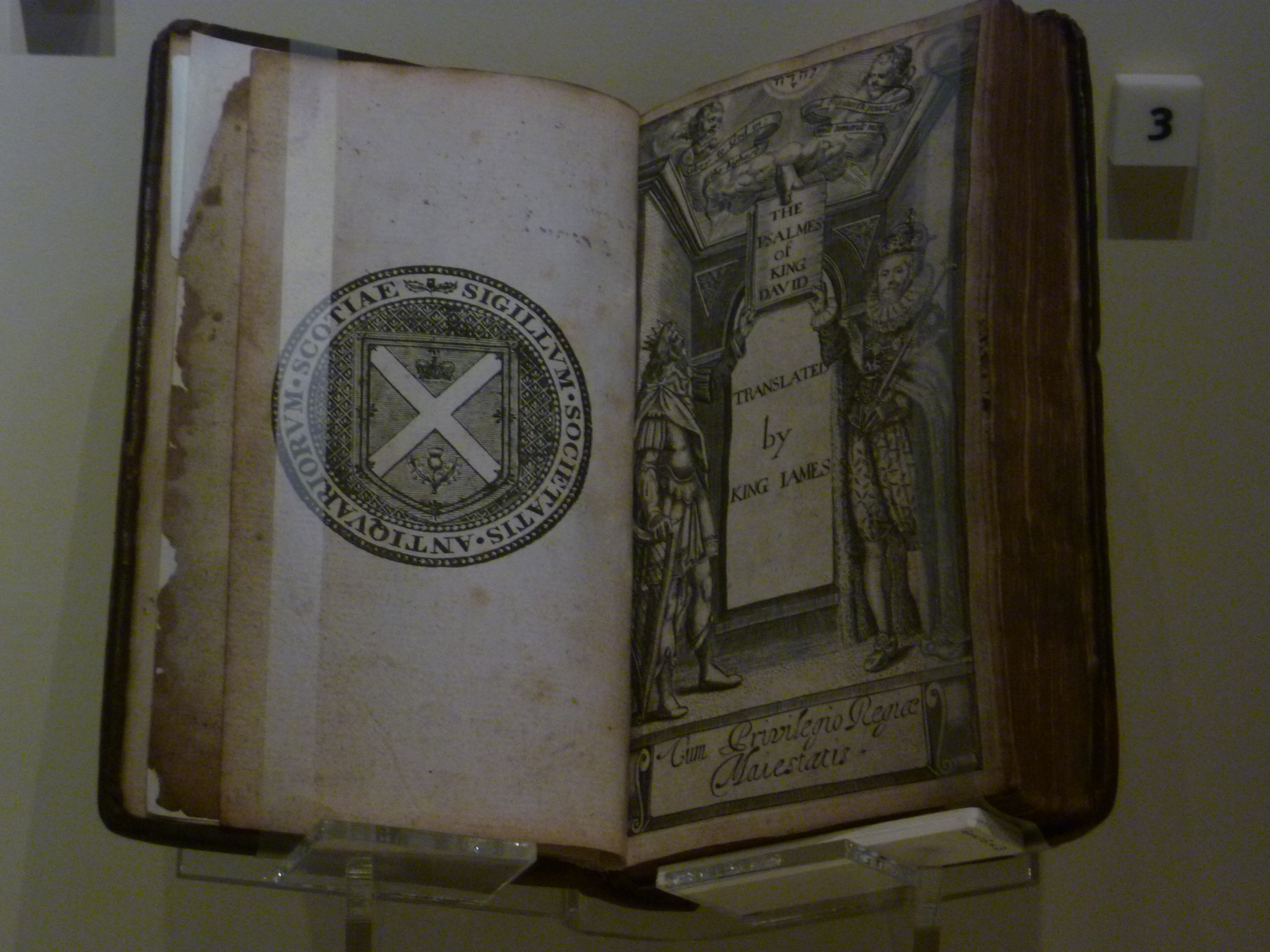
A Book of Psalms printed in the reign of James VI and I

Convention traces the influence of the English of England upon Scots to the 16th-century Reformation and to the introduction of printing. Printing arrived in London in 1476, but the first printing press was not introduced to Scotland for another 30 years. Texts such as the Geneva Bible, printed in English, were widely distributed in Scotland in order to spread Protestant doctrine.

King James VI of Scotland became King James I of England in 1603. Since England was the larger and richer of the two Kingdoms, James moved his court to London in England. The poets of the court therefore moved south and "began adapting the language and style of their verse to the tastes of the English market". To this event McClure attributes "the sudden and total eclipse of Scots as a literary language". The continuing absence of a Scots translation of the Bible meant that the translation of King James into English was used in worship in both countries.

The Acts of Union 1707 amalgamated the Scottish and English Parliaments. However the church, educational and legal structures remained separate. This leads to important professional distinctions in the definitions of some words and terms. There are therefore words with precise definitions in Scottish English which are either not used in English English or have a different definition.

== Phonology ==
Speech example
An example of a middle-class male from Renfrewshire.

Speech example
An example of a working-class male from Fife (Ian Rankin).

Speech example
An example of a male with a background in both Fife and Inverclyde (Iain Banks).

The speech of the middle classes in Scotland tends to conform to the grammatical norms of the written standard, particularly in situations that are regarded as formal. Highland English is slightly different from the variety spoken in the Lowlands in that it is more phonologically, grammatically, and lexically influenced by a Gaelic substratum. Similarly, the English spoken in the North-East of Scotland tends to follow the phonology and grammar of Doric.

Although pronunciation features vary among speakers (depending on region and social status), there are a number of phonological aspects characteristic of Scottish English:

=== Consonants ===
- Scottish English is mostly rhotic, meaning /r/ is typically pronounced in the syllable coda, although some non-rhotic varieties are present in Edinburgh and Glasgow. The phoneme /r/ may be a postalveolar approximant [ɹ], as in Received Pronunciation or General American, but speakers have also traditionally used for the same phoneme a somewhat more common alveolar flap [ɾ] or, now very rare, the alveolar trill [r] (hereafter, ⟨r⟩ will be used to denote any rhotic consonant).
  - /or/ and /ur/ are contrasted so that shore and sure are pronounced differently, as are pour and poor.
  - /r/ before /l/ is strong. An epenthetic vowel may occur between /r/ and /l/ so that girl and world are two-syllable words for some speakers. The same may occur between /r/ and /m/, between /r/ and /n/, and between /l/ and /m/.
- There is a distinction between /w/ and /hw/ in word pairs such as witch and which.
- The phoneme /x/ is common in names and in SSE's many Gaelic and Scots borrowings, so much so that it is often taught to incomers, particularly for "ch" in loch. Some Scottish speakers use it in words of Greek origin as well, such as technical, patriarch, etc. (Wells 1982, 408).
- /l/ is usually velarised (see dark l) except in borrowings like "glen" (from Scottish Gaelic "gleann"), which had an unvelarised l in their original form. In areas where Scottish Gaelic was spoken until relatively recently (such as Dumfries and Galloway) and in areas where it is still spoken (such as the West Highlands), velarisation of /l/ may be absent in many words in which it is present in other areas, but remains in borrowings that had velarised /l/ in Gaelic, such as "loch" (Gaelic "loch") and "clan" (Gaelic "clann").
- /p/, /t/ and /k/ are not aspirated in more traditional varieties, but are weakly aspirated currently.
- The past ending -ed may be realised with /t/ where other accents use /d/, chiefly after unstressed vowels: ended [ɛndɪt], carried [karɪt]
- /θs/ is often used in plural nouns where southern English has /ðz/ (baths, youths, etc.); with and booth are pronounced with /θ/. (See Pronunciation of English th.)
- In colloquial speech, the glottal stop may be an allophone of /t/ after a vowel, as in [ˈbʌʔər]. These same speakers may "drop the g" in the suffix -ing and debuccalise /θ/ to [h] in certain contexts.

=== Vowels ===
- /ɪ/ may be more open [ë̞] for certain speakers in some regions, so that it sounds more like [ɛ] (although /ɪ/ and /ɛ/ do not merge). Other speakers may pronounce it as [ɪ], just as in many other accents, or with a schwa-like ([ə]) quality. Others may pronounce it almost as [ʌ] in certain environments, particularly after /w/ and /hw/.
- The Scottish Vowel Length Rule is a distinctive part of many varieties of Scottish English, though vowel length is generally regarded as non-phonemic. According to the rule, PRICE and all pure vowels bar STRUT, KIT and commA are lengthened before voiced fricatives or before /r/. Lengthening also occurs before a morpheme boundary, so that short need contrasts with long kneed, crude with crewed, and side with sighed.
  - Wells analyses the PRICE vowel's split as specifically phonemic rather than allophonic, citing the regularisation of wife-wives and similar words: both with /ʌi/ despite Aitken's law dictating that the plural should use /ae/.
  - Wells also describes some speakers having length distinctions in words which aren't suggested by Aitken's law: leek [lik] vs. leak [liːk], creek [krik] vs. creak [kriːk]; vane [ven] vs. vain [veːn], made vs. maid; choke vs. joke, badge vs. cadge.
- Scottish English has no /ʊ/, instead transferring Scots /u/. Phonetically, this vowel may be pronounced [ʉ] or even [ʏ]. Thus pull and pool are homophones.
- Cot and caught are not differentiated in most Central Scottish varieties, but they are in some others.
- In most varieties, there is no /æ/-/ɑː/ distinction; therefore, bath, trap, and palm have the same vowel.
- The happY vowel is most commonly /e/ (as in face), but may also be /ɪ/ (as in kit) or /i/ (as in fleece).
- Although other accents have merged non-intervocalic /ɛ/, /ɪ/, /ʌ/ before /r/ (fern–fir–fur merger), Scottish English makes a distinction between the vowels in fern, fir, and fur.
- Many varieties contrast /o/ and /ɔ/ before /r/ so that hoarse and horse are pronounced differently (i.e. they have not undergone the NORTH-FORCE merger).
- Some speakers merge non-final CHOICE with short PRICE.

Monophthongs of Scottish English

Standard Scottish English vowels
Pure vowels
Lexical set		Short	Examples	Long	Examples
KIT		[ɪ~e̠]	bid, pit	—	
FLEECE		[i]	leek, creek	[i(ː)]	leak, creak
FLEECE		[i]	greed, niece	[iː]	agreed, freeze
DRESS	DRESS	[ɛ~ɛ̝]	sever, bed, vexed	[ɛ(ː)~ɛ̝(ː)]	lesbian
DRESS	Scots influence	[ɛ~ɛ̝, ɛ̈]	next	[ɛ(ː)~ɛ̝(ː), ɛ̈(ː)]	never, bury
FACE		[e]	vane, made	[e(ː)]	vain, maid
FACE		[e]	fate	[e(ː)]	bay, hey
TRAP		[ä]	cadge, pat	[ä(ː)]	badge, bad
BATH		[ä]	grass, path	[ä(ː)]	raspberry, rather
PALM		[ä]	balm	[ä(ː)]	father, pa
LOT		[ɔ]	knotty, bod, cot	[ɔ(ː)]	ovulate, positive, orange, moral
CLOTH		[ɔ]	off, cost	—	
THOUGHT		[ɔ, ɒ]	naughty, paw, caught	[ɔ(ː), ɒ(ː)]	cause, jaws
GOAT		[o~oʊ]	choke	[o(ː)~oʊ]	joke
GOAT		[o~oʊ]	oaf	[o(ː)~oʊ]	overt
FOOT		[ʉ~u~ʏ]	good, foot, put	[ʉː~uː~ʏː]	bosom, zhuzh
GOOSE		[ʉ~u~ʏ]	brood, brute	[ʉː~uː~ʏː]	brewed, bruise, moo
STRUT		[ʌ]	bud, putt	—	
Diphthongs
PRICE		[ʌi, ai]	price, bind, strife, write, tide, wider	[aˑe, ɑːe]	prize, buy, strive, writhe, tied, spider
MOUTH	MOUTH	[ʌʉ]	how, pout	—	
MOUTH	Scots influence	[ʌʉ~ʉ]	out, house	—	
CHOICE	finally	[ɔe~oe~ɔi~ɔɪ~ɒɪ]	boy, noise	—	
CHOICE	non-finally	[ɔe~oe~ɔi~ɔɪ~ɒɪ, ʌi]	voice, ointment	—	
Vowels followed by /r/
NEAR		—		[iːr]	beer, mere
SQUARE		—		[eːr~ɛːr]	bear, mare, Mary
NORTH		—		[ɔːr]	born, for
FORCE		—		[oːr]	boar, four, more
CURE		—		[ʉːr]	boor, moor
NURSE	3-way distinction	[ɪr~ʌr]	bird, fir	—	
NURSE	3-way distinction	[ʌr]	curse, fur	—	
NURSE	3-way distinction	[ɛ̝r]	herd, fern	—	
NURSE	Scots influence	[ɛ̈r]	earth, jerk	—	
lettER		[ər]	runner, mercer	—	
Reduced vowels
commA		[ʌ~ə]	Rosa's, cuppa	—	
commA		[ɪ]	pilot	—	
happY		[e~ɪ~i]	studied, turkey	—	

== Scotticisms ==
Scotticisms are idioms or expressions that are characteristic of Scots, especially when used in English. They are more likely to occur in spoken than written language.

The use of Scottish English, as well as of Scots and of Gaelic in Scotland, were documented over the 20th century by the Linguistic Survey of Scotland at the University of Edinburgh.

Scotticisms are generally divided into two types: covert Scotticisms, which generally go unnoticed as being particularly Scottish by those using them, and overt Scotticisms, usually used for stylistic effect, with those using them aware of their Scottish nature.

=== Lexical ===
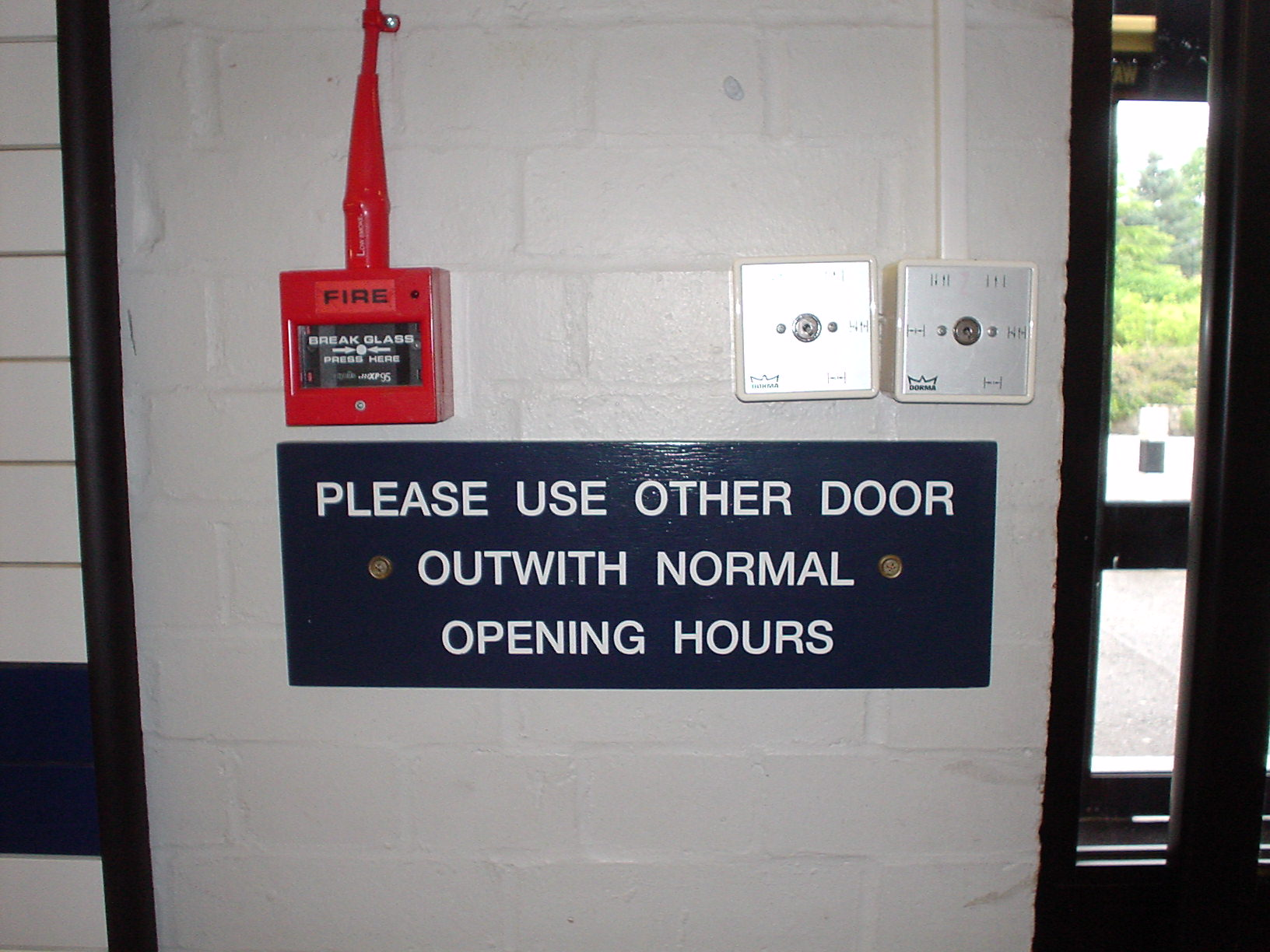
An example of outwith on a sign in Scotland

Scottish English has inherited a number of lexical items from Scots, which are less common in other forms of standard English.

General items are wee, the Scots word for small (also common in Canadian English, New Zealand English and Hiberno-English probably under Scottish influence); wean or bairn for child (the latter from Common Germanic, cf modern Swedish, Norwegian, Danish, Icelandic, Faroese barn, West Frisian bern and also used in Northern English dialects); bonnie for pretty, attractive, (or good looking, handsome, as in the case of Bonnie Prince Charlie); braw for fine; muckle for big; spail or skelf for splinter (cf. spall); snib for bolt; pinkie for little finger; janitor for school caretaker (these last two are also standard in American English); outwith, meaning 'outside of'; cowp for tip or spill; fankle for a tangled mess; kirk for 'church' (from the same root in Old English but with parallels in other Germanic languages, e.g. Old Norse kirkja, Dutch kerk). Examples of culturally specific items are Hogmanay, caber, haggis, bothy, scone (also used elsewhere in the British Isles), oatcake (now widespread in the UK), tablet, rone (roof gutter), teuchter, ned, numpty (witless person; now more common in the rest of the UK) and landward (rural); It's your shot for "It's your turn"; and the once notorious but now obsolete tawse.

The diminutive ending "-ie" is added to nouns to indicate smallness, as in laddie and lassie for a young boy and young girl. Other examples are peirie (child's wooden spinning top) and sweetie (piece of confectionery). The ending can be added to many words instinctively, e.g. bairn (see above) can become bairnie, a small shop can become a wee shoppie. These diminutives are particularly common among the older generations and when talking to children.

The use of "How?" meaning "Why?" is distinctive of Scottish, Northern English and Northern Irish English. "Why not?" is often rendered as "How no?".

There is a range of (often anglicised) legal and administrative vocabulary inherited from Scots, e.g. depute [ˈdɛpjʉt] for deputy, proven [ˈproːvən] for proved (standard in American English), interdict for '"injunction", and sheriff-substitute for "acting sheriff". In Scottish education a short leet is a list of selected job applicants, and a remit is a detailed job description. Provost is used for "mayor" and procurator fiscal for "public prosecutor".

Often, lexical differences between Scottish English and Southern Standard English are simply differences in the distribution of shared lexis, such as stay for "live" (as in: where do you stay?).

=== Grammatical ===
The progressive verb forms are used rather more frequently than in other varieties of standard English, for example with some stative verbs (I'm wanting a drink). The future progressive frequently implies an assumption (You'll be coming from Glasgow?).

In some areas perfect aspect of a verb is indicated using "be" as auxiliary with the preposition "after" and the present participle: for example "He is after going" instead of "He has gone".

The definite article tends to be used more frequently in phrases such as I've got the cold/the flu, he's at the school, I'm away to the kirk.

Speakers often use prepositions differently. The compound preposition off of is often used (Take that off of the table). Scots commonly say I was waiting on you (meaning "waiting for you"), which means something quite different in Standard English.

In colloquial speech shall and ought are scarce, must is marginal for obligation and may is rare. Here are other syntactical structures:

- My hair is needing washed or My hair needs washed for "My hair needs washing" or "My hair needs to be washed".
- Amn't I invited? for Am I not invited?

In Scottish English, the first person declarative I amn't invited and interrogative Amn't I invited? are both possible.

== See also ==
- Bungi dialect of the Canadian Metis people of Scottish/British descent
- Glasgow dialect
- Highland English

== Bibliography ==
- Abercrombie, D. (1979). "The accents of Standard English in Scotland.". In A. J. Aitken; T. McArthur (eds.). Languages of Scotland. Edinburgh: Chambers. pp. 65–84.
- Aitken, A. J. (1979) "Scottish speech: a historical view with special reference to the Standard English of Scotland" in A. J. Aitken and Tom McArthur eds. Languages of Scotland, Edinburgh: Chambers, 85–118. Updated in next.
- Corbett, John; McClure, J. Derrick; Stuart-Smith, Jane, eds. (2003). Edinburgh Student Companion to Scots. Edinburgh: Edinburgh University Press. ISBN 0-7486-1596-2.
- Foulkes, Paul; Docherty, Gerard J., eds. (1999). Urban Voices: Accent Studies in the British Isles. London: Arnold. ISBN 0-340-70608-2.
- Hughes, Arthur; Trudgill, Peter; Watt, Dominic, eds. (2005). English Accents and Dialects (4th Ed.). London: Arnold. ISBN 0-340-88718-4.
- Macafee, C. (2004). "Scots and Scottish English". In Hikey R. (ed.). Legacies of Colonial English: Studies in Transported Dialects. Cambridge: CUP.
- Burchfield, Robert (1994). "English in Scotland". In McClure, J. Derrick (ed.). The Cambridge History of the English Language, volume V. Cambridge, UK: Cambridge University Press. ISBN 0-521-26478-2.
- Scobbie, James M.; Gordeeva, Olga B.; Matthews, Benjamin (2006). "Acquisition of Scottish English Phonology: an Overview". QMU Speech Science Research Centre Working Papers. Edinburgh.
- Scobbie, James M.; Hewlett, Nigel; Turk, Alice (1999). "Standard English in Edinburgh and Glasgow: The Scottish Vowel Length Rule revealed". In Paul Foulkes; Gerard J. Docherty (eds.). Urban Voices: Accent Studies in the British Isles. London: Arnold. pp. 230–245.
- Scobbie, James M.; Gordeeva, Olga B.; Matthews, Benjamin (2007). "Scottish English Speech Acquisition". In Sharynne McLeod (ed.). The International Guide to Speech Acquisition. Clifton Park, New York: Thomson Delmar Learning. pp. 221–240.
- Wells, John C. (1982). Accents of English. Cambridge: Cambridge University Press. ISBN 0-521-22919-7. (vol. 1). (vol. 2)., (vol. 3).
