= Southern Scots =

Dialect of Scots

- Native to: Scotland
- Region: Mid and east Dumfriesshire, Roxburghshire and Selkirkshire
- Language family: Indo-European: Germanic; West Germanic; North Sea Germanic; Anglo-Frisian; Anglic; Anglian; North Anglic; Scots; Southern Scots

Language codes
- ISO 639-3: –
- Glottolog: sout2620

Southern Scots is the dialect (or group of dialects) of Scots spoken in the Scottish Borders counties of mid and east Dumfriesshire, Roxburghshire and Selkirkshire, with the notable exceptions of Berwickshire and Peeblesshire, which are, like Edinburgh, part of the South East Central Scots dialect area. It may also be known as Border Scots, the Border tongue or by the names of the towns inside the South Scots area, for example Teri in Hawick from the phrase Teribus ye teri odin. Towns where Southern Scots dialects are spoken include Earlston, Galashiels (Gala or Galae), Hawick, Jedburgh (Jethart), Kelso (Kelsae), Langholm, Lockerbie, Newcastleton (Copshaw or Copshawholm), St. Boswells (Bosells) and Selkirk.

== Phonology ==
Southern Scots phonology is generally similar to that of the neighbouring Central Scots varieties; however, some vowel realisations may differ markedly.

- ch may be realised /xw/ after back vowels, for example lauch (laugh) and sauch (willow). The cluster och is often realised /ɔux/, for example bocht (bought), coch (cough), dochter (daughter), focht (fought), socht (sought) and troch (trough) often written bowcht, cowch, dowchter, fowcht, sowcht and trowch in dialect writing. After front vowels the realisation is /ç/, occasionally with a yod-glide before it.
- ld and nd are usually elided to /l/ and /n/ in East Dumfriesshire and Roxburghshire.
- a (vowel 17) is often /æ/. Note final a (vowel 12) in awa (away), twa (two) and wha (who) is often realised /eː/, often written awae, twae and whae in dialect writing.
- aw and au (vowel 12) may be realised /ɒː/ rather than /ɑː/ or /ɔː/ as in Central Scots dialects, for example aw (all), cauld (cold), braw (handsome), faw (fall) and snaw (snow), often written using a(a) in dialect writing.
- In some areas ai or a(consonant)e (vowel 4 or 8) may be realised /ɪə/ rather that /e(ː)/, for example baith (both), braid (broad), cake, claes (clothes), grape (grope), kail (cole), laid (load), laif (loaf), made, raip (rope), saip (soap) often written beeath, breead, keeak, cleeaz, greeap, keeal, leead, leeaf, meead, reeap, seeap in dialect writing. When the vowel occurs initially the realisation is often /jɪ/ for example acre, aik (oak), aits, (oats), ale, ane (one) and ance (once) often written yicker, yick, yits, yill, yin and yince in dialect writing. Similarly after /h/ in hale (whole), hame (home) and hairse (hoarse) often written hyil, hyim and hyirs(c)h in dialect writing. The realisation /ɪə/ may also occur for final ae in for example spae (foretell).
- In some varieties e (vowel 16) may be realised /æ/ rather than /ɛ/, for example bed, het (heated), yett (gate), etc.
- Final ee (vowel 11) is usually realised /ei/, for example dree (endure), flee (fly), lee (lie, fib), see, thee (thigh) and tree, often written drei or drey, flei or fley, lei or ley, sei, sey, thei or theye and trei or trey in dialect writing.
- eu (vowel 7 before /k/ and /x/ see ui) is often realised /iu/, for example beuk (book), eneuch (enough), ceuk (cook), leuk (look) and teuk (took).
- ou, also oo (vowel 6) when final is realised /ʌu/, for example brou (brow), cou (cow), dou (dove), hou (how), nou (now), fou (full), pou (pull), sou (sow), allou (allow), throu (through) and you often represented by ow(e) in dialect writing.
- ow, owe (root final) (vowel 13) may be /ɔu/ rather than /ʌu/ in bowe (bow), howe (hollow), knowe (knoll), cowp (overturn), yowe (ewe), etc.
- ui (vowel 7) is often realised /ø/ or /y/, however an unrounded realisation as in Central Scots is now widespread, for example, abuin (above), cuit (ankle) and guid (good). Unrounding to [eː] is now common in adae (ado), buird (board), dae (do), fluir (floor), fuird (ford), shae (shoe) and tae (to~too).

== Grammar ==
The present participle and gerund in may be differentiated /ən/ and /in/, for example, Hei wis aye gutteran aboot. and Hei's fond o guttereen aboot.

== Literature ==
=== Sample text ===
From Mang Howes an Knowes by Elliot Cowan Smith (1891–1917)

Yet, yince in a day, thir braes hed seen unco sichts. Thonder was the moniment A jaloozed ti be the Lilliard's Edge Memorial, so that A was stannin on bluiddy Ancrum Muir. Nae cannie daffin bull- reel splore that fearfih fecht, whan the Dooglas an the Scott wrait off a wheen auld scores an saw day-aboot wui the auld-enemy.

Threh the mids o thir verra busses wad stert the huirn oo read aboot in oor bulks: ilk sheuch an heidie-hole i thir verra rigs was den for fairce sodgers in fechtin-graith-Scots an Ingleesh in a fraineeshin, fidgin mad-keen ti teer the harrigals oot o other; ilk lirk o thir knowes wad heide the gear o war. Hei'd little need be hen-herteet that hed ti beer the ramstam onfaa threh whan the slogan waekent the waller an sterteet the fray i the gray-daylicht,-eendon throwe aa the grewsome mowlie-; whan billies fell seide-be- seide till the brae-face was traisselt an the gress ran reid wui bluid; whan naigs an troopers-the deed- ruckle glutherin i-ther weizants-war cowpeet inti ilka seike, heeds an thraws,-on till the derkeneen rowed its hap roond deed an dei-in, an garrd the hyill yins devall an take a barley. Oor forebears an ther Southron neebers coodna sit soft ava i thae days: they war everly natterin an fechtin. An-sic veeshyis fechteen as it was, tui! Folk are muckle ti mean that beide on aether seide o the Mairches atween twae prood an towty countries 'at canna grei an are aye cuissen-oot. The Borderers lang syne geh thersels an awfih leife o'd. Theirs was nae canty doon-sitteen!

Duist a hip-step-an-a-lowp, an A cam on o an- other kenspeckle landmerk-Peinelheuch. This eez the saicant sic column, A've haar'tell; for, yeh gowsty nicht (wui a wund fit ti blaw doors oot wundihs) a turbleent woare as the ordnar dang doon the firsst Peinelheuch moniment (the whulk, A unk, maun heh been buggen keinda jingle-jointeet, or maim heh cowblt on ov a gey coaggly foond ; ony o the ways, it geh a steiter, an yownt-owre it tirlt!) Bit Border folk are no that easy bett ; they juist paat up a moniment fer better an brawer be what the auld yin was. An now, aabody stravaigin the Borderland-gangers an reiders-sood ken Peinelheuch.

A'd breesteet the brae now, an the road swaipeet doon afore iz. Ay! doon ti ma caav-grund o Teviot- dale-an A lilteet a sang an whewed an yuooted, leike as A'd gane wuth, an laap an flaang as yauld-as a wuddie—boondin bleithely on wui ma' airms shuggiein lowce threh ma oxters. A was abuin-the- woarlt! A was naether ti haud nor ti binnd! If onybody hed eyed iz, hei'd heh thocht A was shuir ready for Bowden!!
