= Central Scots =

Group of dialects of Scots

Central Scots is a group of dialects of Scots.

Central Scots is spoken from Fife and Perthshire to the Lothians and Wigtownshire, often split into North East Central Scots (Northeast Mid Scots) and South East Central Scots (Southeast Mid Scots), West Central Scots (West Mid Scots) and South West Central Scots (Southwest Mid Scots).

Like other varieties of Scots, Central Scots has been undergoing a process of language attrition, whereby successive generations of speakers have adopted more and more features from Standard English. By the end of the twentieth century Scots was at an advanced stage of language death over much of Lowland Scotland.

== Phonology ==
=== Consonants ===
Most consonants are usually pronounced much as in English but:

- ch is traditionally realised /x/ in, for example, bocht (bought), coch (cough), dochter (daughter), focht (fought), socht (sought) and troch (trough).
- ld and nd elision to /l/ and /n/ occurs in all Central Scots dialects but in the Lothians ‘’ld’’ only simplifies to ‘’l’’ finally where the next word begins with a consonant.
- ng: is always /ŋ/.
- nch: usually /nʃ/. brainch (branch), dunch (push), etc.
- r: /r/ or /ɹ/ is pronounced in all positions, i.e. with rhoticity.
- t: may be a glottal stop between vowels or word final.
- wh: usually /ʍ/, older /xʍ/.

=== Vowels ===
Vowel length is usually conditioned by the Scottish vowel length rule (SVLR).

- a (vowel 17) is usually /a/ but to the north and east /ɑ/ also occurs. Note final a (vowel 12) in awa (away), twa (two) and wha (who) is usually realised /eː/ South of the Forth, often written awae, twae and whae in dialect writing.
- aw and au (vowel 12) is usually /ɑː/ in the East and parts of Perthshire or /ɔː/ in the West to West Lothian, however, /ɔː/ is spreading eastwards, for example aw (all), cauld (cold), braw (fine, pleasant), faw (fall) and snaw (snow).
- ai, ay and a (consonant)e, ae (vowel 4 or 8) are usually realised /e/, for example baith (both), braid (broad), cake, claes (clothes), grape (grope), kail (cole), laid (load), laif (loaf), made, raip (rope), saip (soap), spae (foretell). South of the Forth the initial realisation is often /jɪ/, for example acre, aik (oak), aits (oats), ale, ane (one) and ance (once) often written yicker, yick, yits, yill, yin and yince in dialect writing. Where that occurs, ae (one-before nouns) is realised /je/, often written yae in dialect writing.
- e (vowel 16) is usually realised /ɛ/, for example bed, het (heated), yett (gate), etc.
- ea, ei (vowel 3), has generally merged with /i(ː)/ (vowel 2) or /e(ː)/ (vowel 4 or 8) depending on dialect. With /i(ː)/ prevailing in the south east and west and /e(ː)/ prevailing in the north east of the dialect area. Before /r/, /ɛ/ may occur. For example, deid (dead), heid (head), meat (food), clear etc.
- ee (vowels 2 and 11), e (consonant)e (vowel 2). Occasionally ei and ie with ei generally before ch (/x/), but also in a few other words, and ie generally occurring before l and v. The realisation is generally /i(ː)/ e.g. dree (endure), ee (eye), een (eyes), flee (fly), here, lee (lie, fib), see, speir (enquire), steek (shut), thee (thigh) and tree etc. The digraph ea also occurs in a few words such as lea and sea.
- eu (vowel 7 before /k/ and /x/ see ui) is usually realised /(j) ʌ/ in the west and Fife, and /j u/ in the southwest and south of the Forth, for example beuk (book), eneuch (enough), ceuk (cook), leuk (look) and teuk (took).
- o (vowel 18): /ɔ/ has merged with vowel 5 (/o/) throughout much of the dialect area, often spelled phonetically oa in dialect spellings such as boax (box), coarn (corn), Goad (God) joab (job) and oan (on) etc.
- oa (vowel 5) is usually /o:/.
- ou the general literary spelling of vowel 6, also u (consonant)e in some words, is realised /u/, often represented by oo, a 19th-century borrowing from Standard English. e.g. cou (cow), broun (brown), hoose (house), moose (mouse) etc.
- ow, owe (root final), (vowel 13) is usually /ʌu/ in bowe (bow), howe (hollow), knowe (knoll), cowp (overturn), yowe (ewe), etc. Vocalisation to /o/ often occurs before /k/, for example bowk (retch), howk (dig) often written boak and hoak in dialect writing.
- ui, the usual literary spelling of vowel 7 (except before /k/ and /x/ see eu). The older realisation /ø/ may still occur in Perthshire and /e(ː)/ in Parts of Fife otherwise, as is the norm elsewhere, vowel 7 merges with vowel 15 (/ɪ/) in SVLR short environments and vowel 8 (/eː/) in long environments, e.g. buird (board), buit (boot), cuit (ankle), fluir (floor), guid (good), schuil (school), etc. Note that uise v. and uiss n. (use) are [jeːz] and [jɪs]. The realisation /e(ː)/ is often written ai in dialect writing, e.g. flair for fluir (floor), shair for shuir (sure), yaise for uise (use v.) and yiss for uiss (use n.).

== See also ==
- Glasgow dialect
- Berwick-upon-Tweed#Berwick dialect
