= Warlocks and Warriors =

1970 anthology of fantasy short stories edited by L. Sprague de Camp

- Dust-jacket illustration of the first edition.
- Editor: L. Sprague de Camp
- Cover artist: Jim Steranko
- Language: English
- Genre: Fantasy
- Publisher: Putnam
- Publication date: 1970
- Publication place: United States
- Media type: Print (Hardback)
- Pages: 255
- Preceded by: The Fantastic Swordsmen

Warlocks and Warriors is an anthology of fantasy short stories in the sword and sorcery subgenre, edited by American writer L. Sprague de Camp. It was first published in hardcover by Putnam in 1970, and in paperback by Berkley Books in 1971. It was the fourth such anthology assembled by de Camp, following his earlier Swords and Sorcery (1963), The Spell of Seven (1965), and The Fantastic Swordsmen (1967).

== Summary ==
The book collects ten sword and sorcery tales by various authors, with an overall introduction by de Camp. As with the previous volume in the anthology series, The Fantastic Swordsmen, most of the stories are accompanied by maps illustrating their settings.

== Contents ==
- "Introduction" (L. Sprague de Camp)
- "Turutal" (Ray Capella)
- "The Gods of Niom Parma" (Lin Carter)
- "The Hills of the Dead" (Robert E. Howard)
- "Thunder in the Dawn" (Henry Kuttner)
- "Thieves' House" (Fritz Leiber)
- "Black God's Kiss" (C. L. Moore)
- "Chu-Bu and Sheemish" (Lord Dunsany)
- "The Master of the Crabs" (Clark Ashton Smith)
- "The Valley of the Spiders" (H. G. Wells)
- "The Bells of Shoredan" (Roger Zelazny)
