= Brownsbank =

Coordinates: 55.66418°N 3.46773°W

Brownsbank (Brounsbank in Scots) is a cottage close to the small settlement of Candymill to the north of Biggar in Scotland.

It is best known as the former home of the poet Hugh MacDiarmid. His old house is maintained by Biggar Museum Trust and is occupied by a writer in residence. Recent holders of the Brownsbank Creative Writing Fellowship have been James Robertson, Matthew Fitt, Gerry Cambridge, Aonghas MacNeacail, Tom Bryan, Richie McCaffery, and Linda Cracknell. The current (2012) resident is Andrew Sclater. Originally the main criterion was that the writer was a Lowland Scots language poet, like MacDiarmid.

The cottage was visited during MacDiarmid's lifetime by many well-known poets including Norman MacCaig, Sorley MacLean, Allen Ginsberg, Yevgeny Yevtushenko and Seamus Heaney.
