= The Private Memoirs and Confessions of a Justified Sinner =

1824 novel by James Hogg

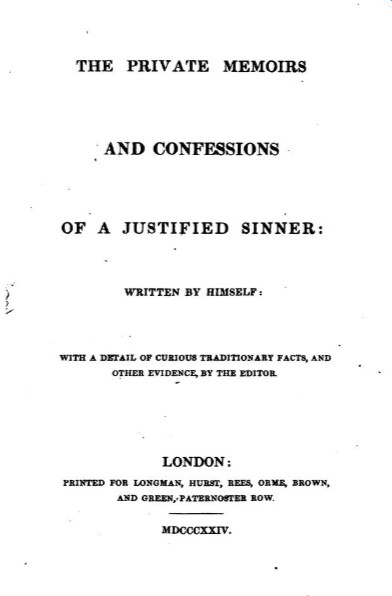
- First edition title page
- Author: James Hogg
- Language: English, Scots
- Genre: Psychological mystery, philosophical novel, satire
- Publication date: 12 July 1824
- Publication place: Scotland
- Pages: 390

The Private Memoirs and Confessions of a Justified Sinner: Written by Himself: With a detail of curious traditionary facts and other evidence by the editor is a novel by the Scottish author James Hogg, published anonymously in 1824.

The plot concerns Robert Wringhim, a staunch Calvinist who, under the influence of the mysterious Gil-Martin, believes he is guaranteed Salvation and justified in killing those he believes are already damned by God. The novel has been classified among many genres, including gothic novel, psychological mystery, metafiction, satire and the study of totalitarian thought; it can also be thought of as an early example of modern crime fiction in which the story is told, for the most part, from the point of view of its criminal anti-hero. The action of the novel is located in a historically definable Scotland with accurately observed settings, and simultaneously implies a quasi-Christian world of angels, devils, and demonic possession. The narrative is set against the antinomian societal structure flourishing in the borders of Scotland in Hogg's day.

The first edition sold very poorly and the novel suffered from a period of critical neglect, especially in the nineteenth century. However, from the second half of the twentieth century it started winning greater critical interest and attention. It was praised by André Gide in an introduction to the 1947 reissue and described by the critic Walter Allen as 'the most convincing representation of the power of evil in our literature'. It has also been seen as a study of religious fanaticism through its deeply critical portrait of the Calvinist concept of predestination. It is written in English, with some sections of Scots that appear in dialogue. The demonic character Gil-Martin may be a reference to the Gaelic word gille-Màrtainn (a poetic term for a fox).

== Background ==
There is no detailed information on the planning, composition, and printing of the Confessions. It was perhaps being contemplated in August 1823 when Blackwood's Edinburgh Magazine included Hogg's article on "A Scots Mummy", most of which was to be incorporated in the novel. More definitely, on 25 October Owen Rees of Longmans wrote, "We will with pleasure undertake the publication of 'Memoirs of a Suiside [sic]' on the same plan as we have done your other works". Longmans had recently brought out The Three Perils of Man and The Three Perils of Woman. A further Longmans letter suggests that the manuscript may have been ready by 12 December. Negotiations over the exact title continued into early 1824, and printing was complete by early June.

== Editions ==
There was only one edition of The Confessions in Hogg's lifetime. It was published by Longman, Hurst, Rees, Orme, Brown, and Green in London on 12 July 1824 and in Edinburgh three days later. The print run was 1000, and the cost 10s 6d (52½p). Publication was anonymous. Sales were poor: of the 900 or so copies sent from the printers in Edinburgh to London little more than a third had been sold by June 1825. Hogg was apparently prompted to suggest a relaunch in the summer of 1828 after an enthusiastic expression of appreciation of the work by Mrs Mary Anne Hughes, and left-over sheets of the first edition were re-issued in Edinburgh as The Suicide's Grave; or, Memoirs and Confessions of a Sinner. Edited by J. Hogg.

Hogg may have had an input into the text of the edition of the Confessions that appeared posthumously in 1837 in Volume 5 of Tales & Sketches by the Ettrick Shepherd, but the extensive bowdlerization and theological censorship in particular suggest publisher's timidity. It was not until 1895 that the original version was basically reinstated.

== Plot ==
Many of the events of the novel are narrated twice; first by the 'editor', who gives his account of the facts as he understands them to be, and then in the words of the 'sinner' himself.

The story starts in 1687 with the marriage of Rabina Orde to the much older George Colwan, Laird of Dalcastle. Rabina despises her new husband because he falls short of her extreme religious beliefs, due to his love of dancing and penchant for drinking alcohol. She initially flees him but her father forces her back, and they live separately in the one house. Rabina gives birth to two sons. The first, George, is indisputably the son of the Laird, but it is strongly implied – though never confirmed – that her second son, Robert, was fathered by the Reverend Wringhim, Rabina's spiritual adviser and close confidant.

George, raised by the Laird, becomes a popular young man who enjoys sport and the company of his friends. Robert, educated by his mother and adoptive father Wringhim, is brought up to follow Wringhim's radical antinomian sect of Calvinism, which holds that only certain elect people are predestined to be saved by God. These chosen few will have a heavenly reward regardless of how their lives are lived.

The two brothers meet, as young men, in Edinburgh where Robert starts following George through the town, mocking and provoking him and disrupting his life. He appears to have the ability of appearing wherever George is. When on a hill-top, George sees a vision of his brother in the sky and turns to find him behind him, preparing to throw him off a cliff. Robert rejects any friendly or placatory advances from his brother.

Finally, George is murdered by being stabbed in the back, apparently during a duel with one of his drinking acquaintances. The only witnesses to the murder were a prostitute and her despicable client, who claim that the culprit was Robert, aided by what appears to be the double of George's friend. Before Robert can be arrested, he disappears.

The second part of the novel consists of Robert's account of his life. It purports to be a document, part-handwritten and part-printed, which was found after his death. It recounts his childhood, under the influence of the Rev Wringhim, and goes on to explain how he becomes in thrall to an enigmatic companion who says his name is Gil-Martin. This stranger, who could be seen to be the Devil, appears after Wringhim has declared Robert to be a member of 'the elect' and so predestined to eternal salvation. Gil-Martin, who is able to transform his appearance at will, soon directs all of Robert's pre-existing tendencies and beliefs to evil purposes, convincing him that it is his mission to "cut sinners off with the sword", and that murder can be the correct course of action. From Gil-Martin's boasting of the number of his adherents and size of his dominions, Robert falls into the delusion that he is Peter the Great of Russia, who visited England about that time.

The confession traces Robert's gradual decline into despair and madness, as his doubts about the righteousness of his cause are counteracted by Gil-Martin's increasing domination over his life. Finally, Robert loses control over his own identity and even loses track of time. During these lost weeks and months, it is suggested that Gil-Martin assumes Robert's appearance to commit further crimes. However, there are also suggestions in the text, that 'Gil-Martin' is a figment of Robert's imagination, and is simply an aspect of his own personality: as, for example when 'the sinner' writes, 'I feel as if I were the same person' (as Gil-Martin).

Robert flees, but is pursued and tormented by devils and can find refuge only as a shepherd. Finally he hangs himself with a grass rope – in which it is suggested that he is aided by devils.

The novel concludes with a return to the 'Editor's Narrative' which explains how the sinner's memoir was discovered in his grave. Hogg appears as himself in this section, expressing scorn of the project to open the grave.

== Structure ==
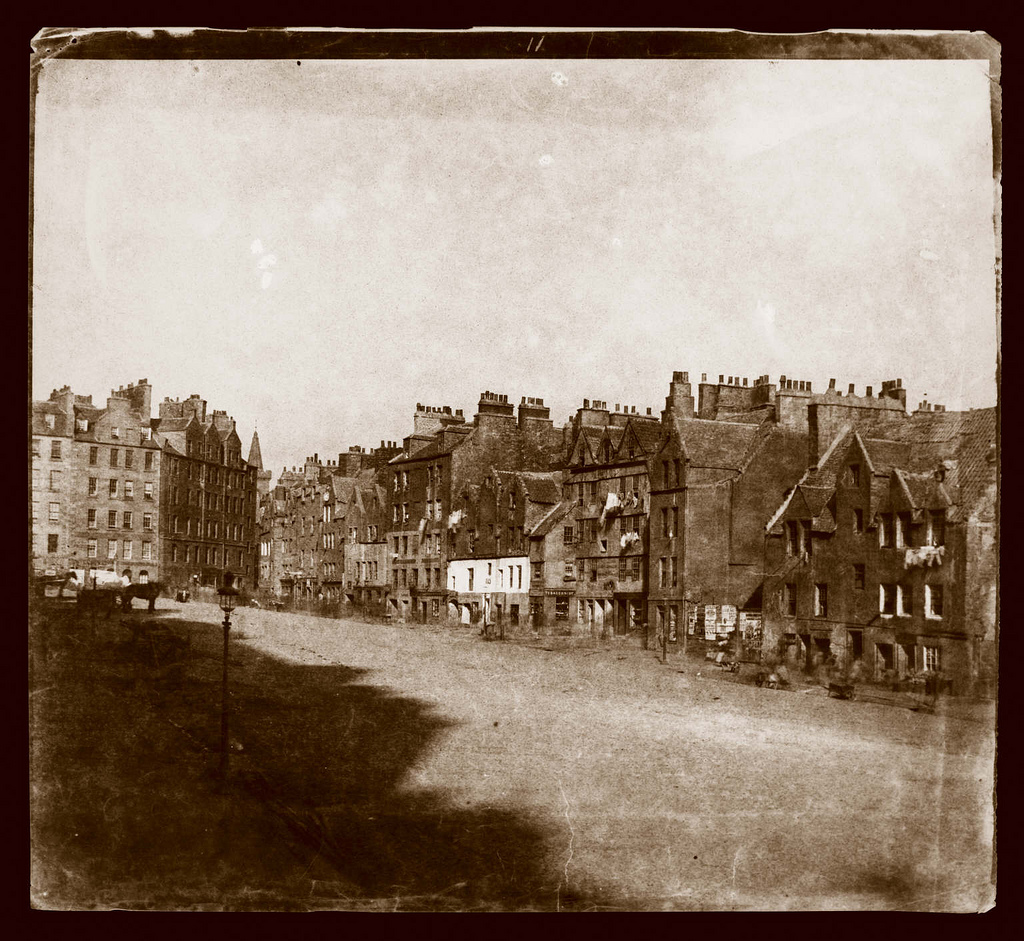
Early photograph of the Grassmarket in Edinburgh, one of the locations in Confessions, taken around 28 years after publication of the novel.

The Private Memoirs and Confessions was published as if it were the presentation of a found document from the previous century offered to the public with a long introduction by its unnamed editor. The structure thus is of a single, self-contained publication offering a historically contextualised story, but the effect is unsettling. When taken together, the different elements create an impression of ambivalence and inconsistency, as if they were intended to present the reader with a conundrum. Because Hogg's novel appears to test concepts of internal validity, historical truth or a single rational world-view, contemporary critics sometimes regard it as an early anticipation of ideas associated with postmodernism.

The Confession (which comprises the middle section of the novel) is an autobiographical account of the life of Robert Wringhim and, passim, his statement on the crimes with which his name was associated. The document is revealed to be in part a printed document intended for publication and in part a handwritten manuscript. The first section narrates events retrospectively. It is followed by events recounted "in real time", describing events during his last days on earth. It has been proposed that the evangelical Lady Colquhoun and her husband, James, were the models for the character of Rabina and George Colwan.

The Editor's Narrative "introduces" this memoir with "factual" descriptions "from local tradition" of events associated with Wringhim up to the murder of his estranged brother, George Colwan. This Editor's Narrative later resumes at the end of the novel as a post-script appending further details that supposedly comment on the text. This includes the transcript of an "authentic letter" published in Blackwood's Magazine "for August 1823" by a certain James Hogg. The ending finally places the novel in the present time by relating the mystery of a suicide's grave, the exhumation of its remains and (only on the very last pages) the "recovery" of the manuscript. In effect, this post-script reveals what a real "editor" may more properly have set at the beginning, and casts it as the "conclusion".

Discounting any transcendental inferences, there are two time-frames in the novel. The events of the memoir are set in a carefully identifiable period of Scottish history between the late 17th century and early 18th century. (The first date on the opening page is the year 1687.) The editor's narrative is even more concretely dated and situated in present time, external to the novel, through the device of the letter by Hogg included by the fictional editor (which was in fact published in Blackwood's Magazine as described). Hogg's brief cameo role in the final pages of the novel is effectively his "signature" appended to the otherwise anonymous original publication.

== Reception ==
The Confessions received a mixed response from its ten reviewers, most of whom were aware that Hogg was the author of the anonymous work. The Literary Gazette wrote, "Mystical and extravagant...it is, nevertheless, curious and interesting; a work of irregular genius, such as we might have expected from Mr. Hogg, the Ettrick Shepherd, whose it is." The Examiner was enthusiastic, "a surprising lack of probability, or even possibility, is accompanied with a portion of mental force and powerful delineation, which denote the conception and the hand of a master".

== Influence ==
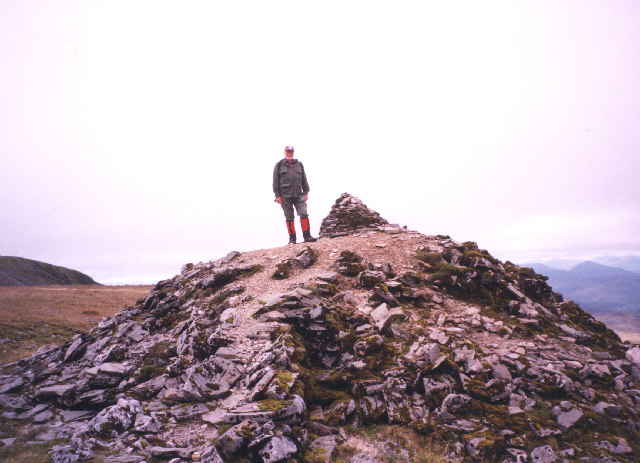
Cairn on the reputed site of an 18th-century suicide's grave, Scotland.

- The novel has been cited as an inspiration for Robert Louis Stevenson's 1886 novella The Strange Case of Dr Jekyll and Mr Hyde and especially his 1889 novel The Master of Ballantrae, examining the duality of good and evil. Stevenson recalled, "The book since I read it in black, pouring weather on Tweedside, has always haunted and puzzled me. It is without doubt a real work of imagination, ponderated and achieved."
- The novel Gilchrist (1994) by Maurice Leitch is a reworking of Confessions in a contemporary Northern Ireland setting, with a central character loosely based on Ian Paisley.
- James Hynes' gothic horror novel The Lecturer's Tale features a Hogg scholar whose intention to write his dissertation on guilt and predestination in Justified Sinner is deflected into writing on the more fashionable Joseph Conrad.
- In James Robertson's 2006 novel The Testament of Gideon Mack the protagonist Gideon Mack, a minister of the Scottish kirk, comes across a copy of a book on elves, fauns and fairies in his father's study. Gideon learns that the book was signed for his father by one "G.M.". Like the anti-hero of Hogg's novel, Gideon claims to have had an encounter with the Devil and begins to think that his father has met him as well. He suggests that "G.M." might be short for "Gil Martin".
- In her book Between Men: English Literature and Male Homosocial Desire, Eve Sedgwick views Robert Wringhim's character as failing to successfully negotiate the demands of the configuration of male homosocial desire existing in his society by being too manifest in his desire for other men.
- Anthony Boucher and J. Francis McComas described a 1949 edition as a "forgotten classic" and concluded, "This terrifying picture of the devil's subtle conquest of a self-righteous man is a masterpiece of the supernatural."
- The Bad Sister by Emma Tennant is a modern-day version of Hogg's novel with a female protagonist.
- In the short film Voices, starring Sean Biggerstaff, the central character uses audio extracts of himself reading Hogg's novel to create his final apology.

== Theatrical productions ==
- 1971 dramatisation by Jack Ronder, directed by Richard Eyre, and staged as an Edinburgh International Festival production at the Lyceum Theatre, Edinburgh.
- 2009 dramatisation of the novel starring Iain Robertson and Ryan Fletcher produced by the Lyceum Theatre, Edinburgh.
- 2013 adaptation titled Paul Bright's Confessions of a Justified Sinner reconstructed by Untitled Projects, a co-production with the National Theatre of Scotland, Summerhall and Tramway.

== Film ==
- A 1986 Polish film adaptation by director Wojciech Jerzy Has, Memoirs of a Sinner.
- Bill Douglas left a script adaptation but died before it could be realised.
- Scottish crime writer Ian Rankin, creator of the famous Inspector Rebus novels, has written a script for a film based on James Hogg's Memoirs and Confessions. According to his website, as of December 2010, his team were 'still on the hunt for the right director.' There were no plans for production as of May 2012.
- Digby Rumsey wrote a screenplay and was planning to produce a film as of 2009.

== Radio ==
In March 2023, BBC Radio 4 broadcast a version by Robert Forrest in which the tale is told retrospectively by Robert to two women, Bella and Arabella, who hold him captive near the end of his life.

== Music ==
- Thomas Wilson's, opera, Confessions of a Justified Sinner (1972–75), commissioned by Scottish Opera, is based on the novel.

== See also ==
- Fourth wall
