= And the Land Lay Still =

2010 novel by James Robertson

- 2010 UK hardback edition
- Author: James Robertson
- Language: English, Scots
- Genre: Literary fiction
- Publisher: Hamish Hamilton
- Publication date: 2010
- Publication place: Scotland
- Media type: Print (hardback and paperback)
- Pages: 688
- ISBN: 978-0-241-14356-8
- OCLC: 619089421
- Preceded by: The Testament of Gideon Mack

And the Land Lay Still is the fourth novel by Scottish novelist and poet James Robertson. Upon publication in 2010 it was widely praised for its breadth of exploration of Scottish society in the latter half of the 20th century.

== Plot summary ==
The novel’s narrative is shaped around the portfolio of the late photographer Angus Pendreich. His son Michael is involved in the establishment of a new exhibition of his father’s work.

The book focuses on the characters presented in these photographs, which span post-war Scotland across geographies and social classes from the homeless to senior politicians. Their disparate stories present a collage that highlights the highs and lows of modern Scottish society.

== Critical reception ==
The award-winning epic novel received near-unanimous critical acclaim in the mainstream British press.

Writing in The Independent, Doug Johnstone praised the novel's readability and its portrayal of Scottish history through ordinary people's lives.

The Observer said that Robertson had “caught something of the sheer bloody-minded craving for self-sabotage in the Scottish soul so accurately it's painful”. The Herald was impressed by “a state-of-the-nation novel with a Dickensian scope”.

The Daily Telegraph was impressed by the book’s ability to meld “engrossing individual storylines” with “cultural shifts such as the birth of Scottish nationalism, the death of industry, the sexual revolution and the boom in North Sea oil”. The New Statesman noted that four years’ worth of research had gone into the book and finished its review with the line: “It’s some achievement”.

Writing in The Guardian, the writer Irvine Welsh said of the "highly ambitious" book that it “represents nothing less than a landmark for the novel in Scotland, and underlines the author's position as one of Britain's best contemporary novelists”. Scotland First Minister Alex Salmond selected the novel as his book of the year for 2010, telling the Scotland on Sunday that it was “outstanding”, “important”, and the author’s finest work.

The novel won the 2010 Scottish Book of the Year Award and was long-listed for the 2011 Creative Scotland Book of the Year Awards.
