= The Fantastic Swordsmen =

1967 anthology of fantasy short stories edited by L. Sprague de Camp

- Cover of the first editionm
- Editor: L. Sprague de Camp
- Cover artist: Jack Gaughan
- Language: English
- Genre: Fantasy
- Publisher: Pyramid Books
- Publication date: 1967
- Publication place: United States
- Media type: Print (paperback)
- Pages: 204
- Preceded by: The Spell of Seven
- Followed by: Warlocks and Warriors

The Fantastic Swordsmen is a 1967 anthology of fantasy short stories in the sword and sorcery subgenre, edited by American writer L. Sprague de Camp. It was first published in paperback by Pyramid Books. It was the third such anthology assembled by de Camp, following his earlier Swords and Sorcery (1963) and The Spell of Seven (1965). It has also been translated into German.

== Summary ==
The book collects eight sword and sorcery tales by various authors, with an overall introduction by de Camp. Each story is accompanied by a map illustrating its setting (a feature repeated in the next volume in the anthology series, Warlocks and Warriors). Most of the maps are by cover artist Jack Gaughan, though the map of Moorcock's "Young Kingdoms" is by James Cawthorn.

== Contents ==
- "Tellers of Tales" (introduction) (L. Sprague de Camp)
- "Black Lotus" (Robert Bloch)
- "The Fortress Unvanquishable Save for Sacnoth" (Lord Dunsany)
- "Drums of Tombalku" (Robert E. Howard and L. Sprague de Camp)
- "The Girl in the Gem" (John Jakes)
- "Dragon Moon" (Henry Kuttner)
- "The Other Gods" (H. P. Lovecraft)
- "The Singing Citadel" (Michael Moorcock)
- "The Tower" (Luigi de Pascalis, originally in Italian, translated by L. Sprague de Camp)
