= John Maclaurin, Lord Dreghorn =

Scottish advocate

The Hon John Maclaurin, Lord Dreghorn FRSE (15 December 1734 – 24 December 1796) was a Scottish advocate who rose to be a Senator of the College of Justice. In 1783 he was one of the founders of the Royal Society of Edinburgh. He was a prolific author on both legal and literary issues.

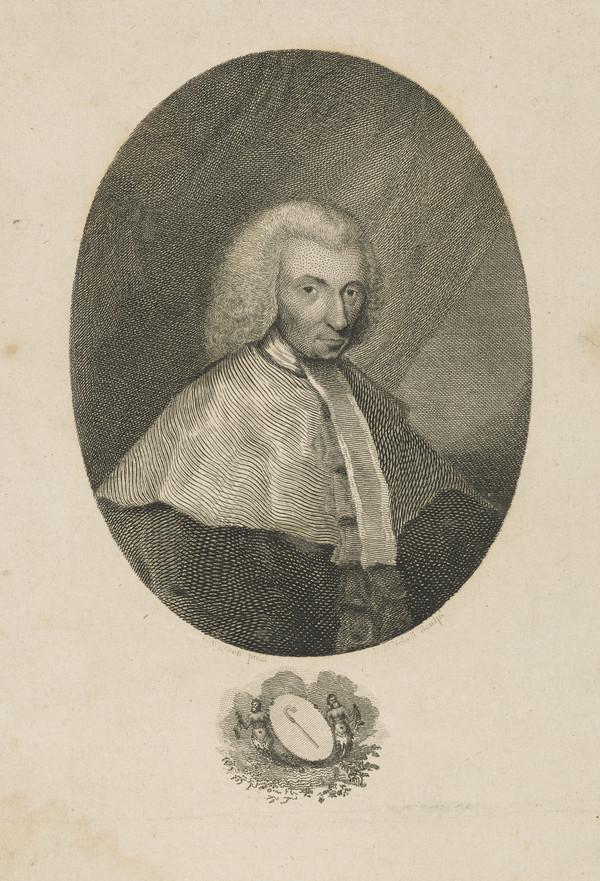
John MacLaurin Portrait and Armorial Ensign

== Life ==
He was born on 15 December 1734 the son of Anne Stewart and the noted Scots mathematician, Colin Maclaurin. He was educated at the High School in Edinburgh 1745 to 1747 then studied law at the University of Edinburgh. He qualified as an advocate in 1756. Maclaurin lived in Dreghorn Castle near Colinton (just south of Edinburgh), acquired from the Home family.

In 1757, Maclaurin wrote The Philosopher's Opera, a ballad opera satirising the philosopher David Hume's enthusiasm for the Rev. John Home's popular play, Douglas (1756).

=== The Joseph Knight case heard in 1778 ===
"Perhaps it is improper to consider, as part of the works of Mr Maclaurn,any of his professional papers; but there are two which deserve to be remembered, the Information he wrote for Mungo Campbell, who was tried before the High Court of Justiciary for the murder of Lord Eglinton ; and an Information for Joseph Knight, a negro, upon the great question, whether a slave upon landing in this conntry, was entitled to his fieedom? The former has been universally read, and contributed not a little to raise the author at the bar : the Inter is upon a subject which all can understand, and as it treats, not merely of the particular case of the negro for whom i: was written, but of tho great general question as to the justice of abolishing the Slave Trade, it may therefore be considered »s instructive and interesting, at this period, when the fall of negro slavery is fast approaching. It enters very minutely, not only into the argument, but quotes all the noted authors who have written on this truly important subject.

Mr Maclaurin had been employed in a former case, and was retained by the masterr to plead against the slave; but he having died, no decision was given. When the case of Knight occurred, he undertook his cause; [ Knight v Wedderburn ] and having pleaded against the slave as a lawyer, he rejoiced to have an opportunity of pleading for him as a man. He was assisted in the benevolent (gratis) undertaking by some other advocates of the first eminence at the bar, [Boswell and Johnson] among whom was Mr Henry Dundas, now one of the Secretaries of State, and another gentleman, since promoted to the Bench.—These gentlemen volunteered in the cause of Freedom, and the negro prevailed, The motto Mr Maclaurin prefixed to his Information was taken from Virgil's second Eclogue :

"Quamvis ille niger, quamvis tu candidus esses;" “As black as he is, so should you be white”

which was so apposite to the subject, that a gentleman, intending to pay a compliment to the author, asked him if he had made th'e motto ?

=== Chief of the Argyll MacLaurin Clan ===
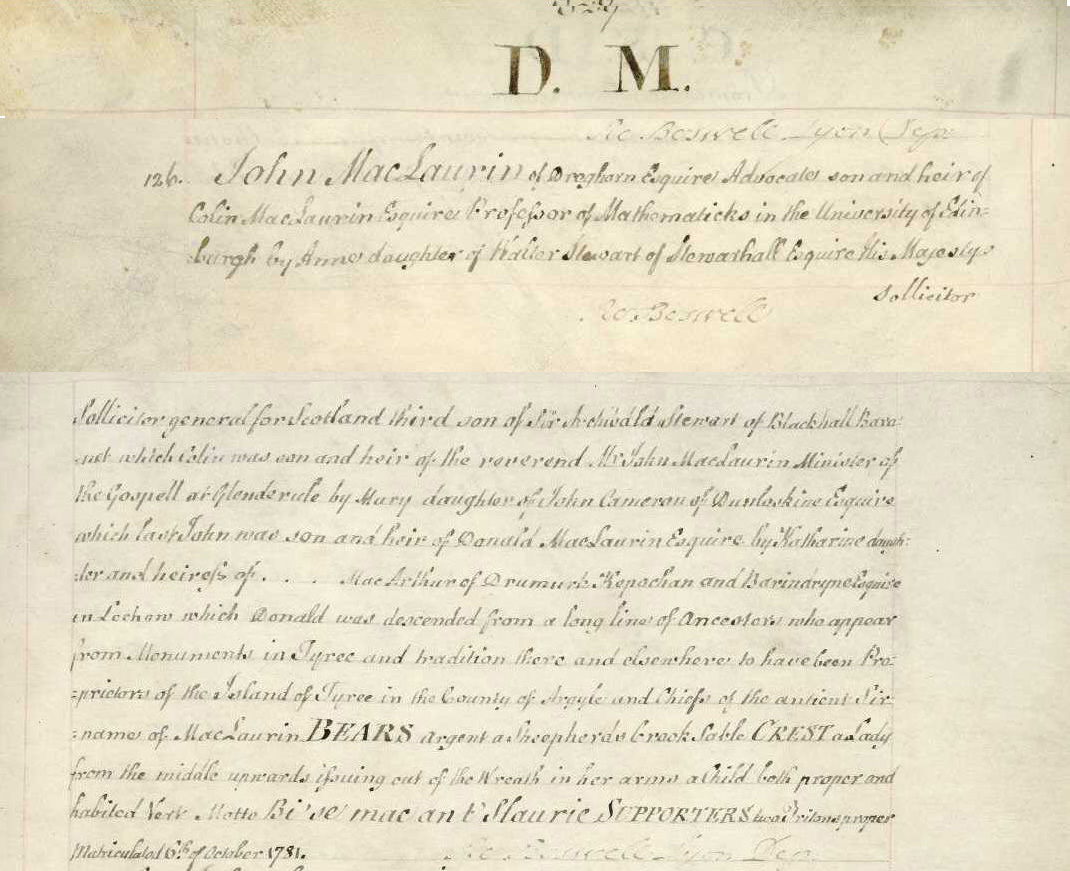
Grant of Arms John MacLaurin

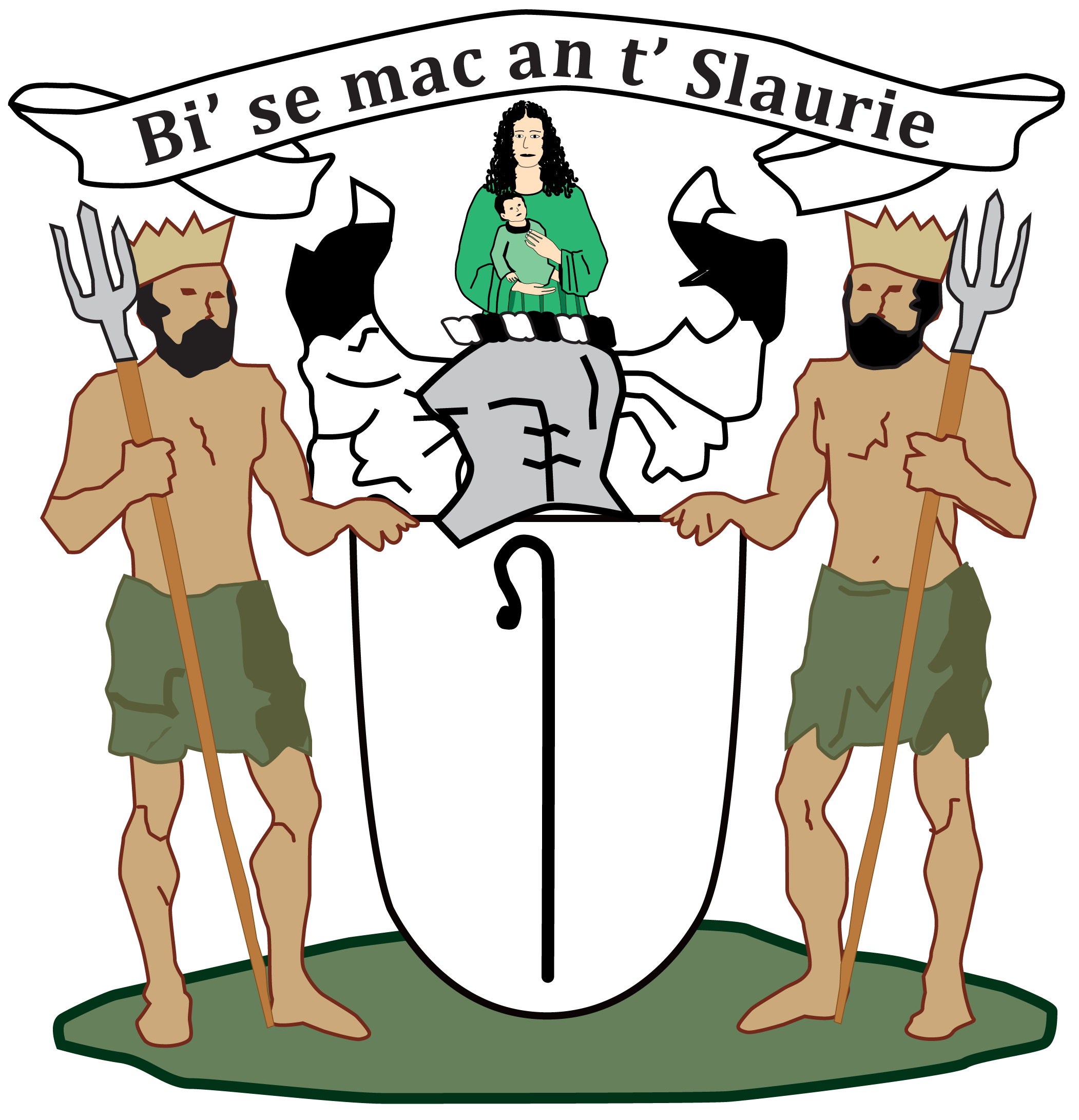
John MacLaurin Armorial Ensign with Supporters

In 1781 he was matriculated as Clan Chief of the Clan MacLaurin with origin in Tiree, by the Court of the Lord Lyon King of Arms. Clan MacLaurin is considered a different lineage from the Balquhidder MacLarens. "In granting him (Major Donald MacLaren in 1957) the appropriate arms, with supporters, the Lord Lyon makes a distinction between the MacLarens of Balquhidder and Strathearn, and the MacLarens (MacLaurins) of Tiree, whose arms and descent are, his Lordship holds, those of a different race" Sir Thomas Innes of Learney 1957, via Elizabeth Roads, LVO, FSA, AIH., Snawdoun Herald, Lyon Keeper of the Records, Court of the Lord Lyon King of Arms.

In 1788 he was created a Senator of the College of Justice and given the title Lord Dreghorn, after his family home.

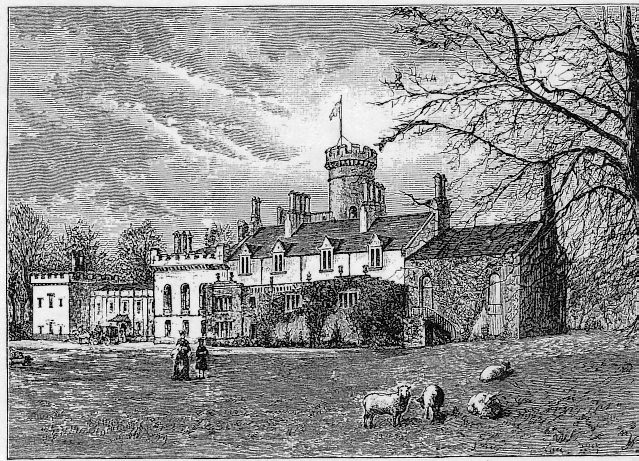
Dreghorn House

In 1790 he entered a famous correspondence with Lord Monboddo regarding the exact location of Troy.

He died on 24 December 1796. He is buried in Greyfriars Kirkyard in central Edinburgh.

== Publications ==
- Apology for the Writers against the Tragedy of Douglas (1757)
- Hampden (1757)
- The Philosopher’s Opera (1757)
- The Keekeiad (1760)
- Considerations on the Right of Patronage (1766)
- Consideration on the Nature and Origin of Literary Property (1767)
- Essays in Verse (1769)
- Observations on some Points of Law with a System of the Judicial Law of Moses (1769)
- The Story of Zeyn Akasnam, Prince of Balsora (1770)
- Arguments and Decisions in the High Court (1774)

== Family ==
In 1762 he married Esther Cunningham (died 1780).

== In fiction ==
John Maclaurin features as a character in James Robertson's novel, Joseph Knight (2003).
