= The Fanatic (novel) =

First edition

The Fanatic is a novel written by the Scottish author James Robertson, first published in 2000.

== Overview ==
The book progresses along two lines. The first is historical and deals with the events of the Scottish Covenanters of the 17th Century. The second thread tells the story of a tourist guide (Andrew Carlin) in devolution-era Edinburgh, whose interest in the character he portrays leads to his study and obsession with two men: James Mitchel, a Protestant fanatic, convinced of a deep connection with God; and Major Thomas Weir, a presbyterian hardliner who was executed in 1670 for supposed witchcraft. The novel was Robertson's first major work and showed early signs of the success that was to follow in Joseph Knight and The Testament of Gideon Mack.

== List of main characters ==
Character	Notes	Historical/Fictional
Andrew Carlin	Protagonist, tour worker	Fictional
James Mitchel	17th century religious fanatic	There was a James Mitchell (2 ls) who tried to kill Sharp executed 1676
Major Thomas Weir	Covenanter, executed for witchcraft	Historical
Hugh Hardie	Tour guide	Fictional
Jean Weir	The Major's sister, executed for incest and witchcraft	Historical

== Information ==
Andrew Carlin works as a ghost on a nightly tour of Old Edinburgh. With Stick, cape and rubber rat he pretends to be the spirit of Major Weir, a religious extremist burnt at the stake in 1670. Carlin's research into Weir draws him into the past and, in particular, to James Mitchel, a 'justified sinner', imprisoned in 1674 for the attempted assassination of the Archbishop of St Andrews. Through the story of Carlin and Mitchel, The Fanatic reveals an extraordinary history of Scotland: a tale of betrayals, stolen meetings, lost memories, smuggled journeys and disguised identities.

== Critical response ==
Like the majority of Robertson's other work, The Fanatic has a strong historical, social and political backbone running throughout the novel. Taken from the blurb of the 2001 edition, the Scotland on Sunday newspaper was full of high praise: 'Robertson takes not just history but the notion of history; not just the question of what truth is but the act of questioning itself and breathes an extraordinary life into them...In this complex, superbly claustrophobic novel where everything is meticulously researched and, just as importantly, meticulously imagined, he urges us to see ourselves anew.'

== Publication information ==
Published by HarperCollins (United Kingdom) / Fourth Estate (United States), 2001. ISBN 978-1-84115-189-2.
