= Thomas Weir =

Scottish soldier and presumed occultist who was executed

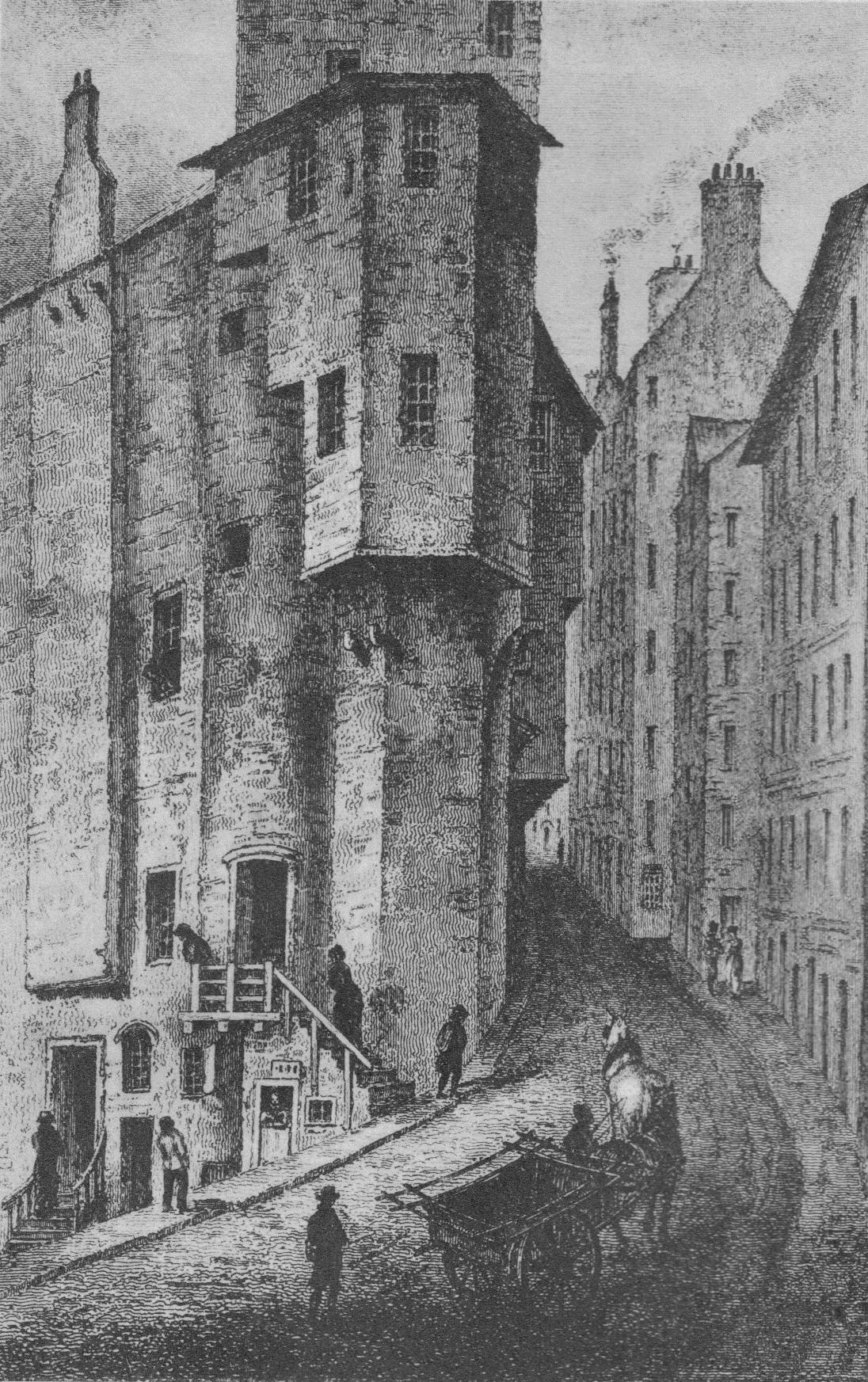
Major Weir's House in the West Bow, Edinburgh

Major Thomas Weir (1599 – 1670) was a Scottish soldier and presumed occultist, executed for bestiality, incest and adultery.

Weir was a Covenanter who professed a particularly strict form of Presbyterianism. His spoken prayers earned him a reputation for religiosity which attracted visitors to his home in Edinburgh. He served under James Graham, Marquis of Montrose, as a lieutenant in the Army of the Covenant. He was known as the "Bowhead Saint", because his residence was near the top of the West Bow, off the Grassmarket, and "saint" was a popular epithet for particularly fervent Calvinists.

== Early life ==
Weir was a native of Carluke in Lanarkshire, descendant of one of the most powerful and ancient families of the county, the Weir-de Veres. He was the son of Thomas Weir, Laird of Kirkton. His wife Lady Jean Somerville was reputed to possess clairvoyant powers. His grandfather was William Weir, or Vere, of Stonebyres Castle who married Lady Elizabeth Hamilton.

== Career ==
Weir was a signatory to the Solemn League and Covenant and an officer in the Scottish anti-Royalist army. As a Lieutenant, he served in Ulster during the Irish Rebellion of 1641. In 1650, he obtained the post of commander of the Edinburgh Town Guard, thus acquiring the rank of major. When the defeated royalist general Montrose—branded a traitor for changing sides—was brought to Edinburgh for execution, Weir, in his capacity as Captain of the Edinburgh City Guard, oversaw the execution.

== Personal life ==
Weir lived with his spinster sister Jane or Jean, known as Grizel (sometimes "Grizelle") by her friends. Their house was on the West Bow, but according to James Grant, it was in a rear courtyard accessed through a building at the top of West Bow which belonged to a David Williamson. This would equate in modern terms to the inner courtyard of Riddell's Court. The West Bow frontage was replaced in 1878. In his capacity as a lay preacher and apparently pious man he and his neighbours acquired the nickname the "Bowhead Saints".

== Confession ==
Following retirement, Weir fell ill in 1670, and from his sickbed began to confess to a secret life of crime and vice. Andrew Ramsay, the Lord Provost, initially found the confession implausible and took no action, but eventually Weir and his spinster sister, Jean Weir (known to her friends as "Grizel" or, Grizelle), were taken to the Edinburgh Tolbooth for interrogation. Major Weir, now in his seventies, continued to expand on his confession and Grizel, having seemingly entirely lost her wits, gave an even more exaggerated history of witchcraft, sorcery and vice. She related how many years before a stranger had called in a "fiery" coach to take her brother to Dalkeith and how during the short trip another man (Robert Chambers), had given him "supernatural intelligence" of the Scots' defeat at Worcester that same day. (In fact, Cromwell's Commonwealth Commissioners in Scotland had been based in Dalkeith and would have been among the first to know the outcome of the battle—though not, of course, on the same day.) Grizel maintained that Weir derived his power from his walking stick, topped by a carved human head, giving rise to later accounts that it had often been seen parading down the street in front of him.

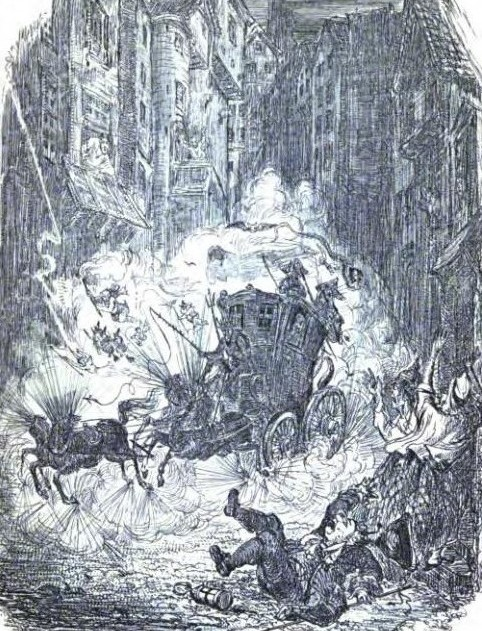
A depiction of Weir's coach careering down the West Bow at midnight

Whilst as a high-ranking public figure Weir was not believed at first, his own confession together with that of his sister sealed his fate. They were initially held at the Tolbooth Prison on the Canongate. They were cross-examined by John Sinclair, the minister of Ormiston, and put on trial on 9 April 1670. Both were quickly found guilty at their trial and sentenced to death.

== Execution ==
While awaiting execution, they were confined in the former leper colony at Greenside below the Calton Hill. Weir was garroted and burned at a stake at the head of Leith Walk (where Greenside Church was later built) then his remains were gibbetted at the Gallowlee (literally, "gallows field") on the road between Edinburgh and Leith (a site later occupied by the Shrubhill tram depot, then bus garage, near Pilrig on Leith Walk). His last words, while being urged to pray for forgiveness, were reported as, "Let me alone—I will not—I have lived as a beast, and I must die as a beast". Weir's stick of thornwood was consigned to the flames after him, reportedly making "rare turnings" in the fire. Shortly before his end Weir had made a further public confession of incest with his sister, who was executed by hanging at the Grassmarket gibbet.

== Burial ==
The remains of the Weirs were buried at the base of the gallows at Shrub Hill, as was the custom of the time.

== Aftermath ==
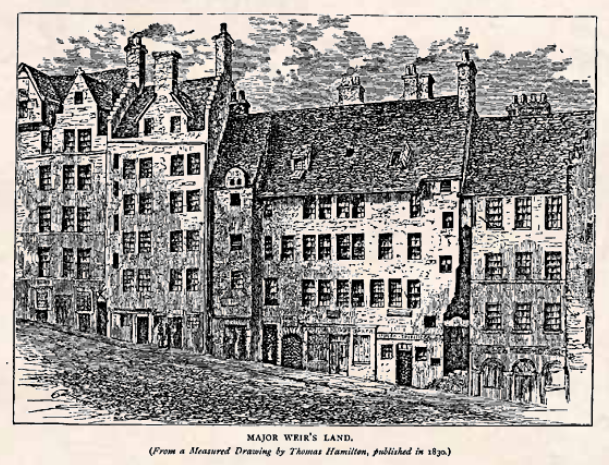
Major Weir's Land on the West Bow

Weir's house in the West Bow stood empty for over a century because of its reputation for being haunted. It was said that one of Weir's enchantments made people ascending the stair think they were descending in the opposite direction. It was eventually bought cheaply in about 1780 by an ex-soldier William Patullo who moved in with his wife. They are said to have fled the house on their first night there after experiencing a strange apparition of a calf approaching them in the night, propping itself up with its forelegs on the bed-end and staring at them in bed.

Due to his infamy the top section of West Bow was known for two centuries as "Major Weir's Land", and the same section was reputedly haunted by the ghost of Weir for a hundred years.

The story of Weir has been proposed as an influence on Dr Jekyll and Mr Hyde, by Robert Louis Stevenson. The 2000 novel The Fanatic by James Robertson features Weir as a character and uses the events surrounding him as a central aspect of the novel's narrative and themes.
