= Dunlop Street =

Street in Glasgow, Scotland

Coordinates: 55°51′21.8″N 4°15′11.0″W

Dunlop Street is a thoroughfare in the city of Glasgow, the largest city in Scotland. The street runs east from Maxwell Street, running parallel to Clyde Street, before making a right turn to join Clyde Street (next to the river Clyde).

== History ==
The street was opened in 1772. It was named after Colin Dunlop of Carmyle, a noted Tobacco Lord who became Lord Provost of Glasgow from 1770 to 1772.

== Theatre ==
Three Glasgow comedians of the 18th Century – Love, Jackson and Beate – tried to open a theatre in Glasgow in 1762. Permission was refused by the local magistrates. However a theatre was later opened in the nearby village of Grahamston (around the site of the Glasgow Central railway station) in 1764. Many were against the opening of that theatre; it was set on fire on its opening night in the spring of 1764. Refitted it lasted until 16 April 1782 when it was finally burnt to the ground.

Jackson took a brave decision to open a new theatre in Dunlop Street in January 1785. Stars of the time Mrs Siddons, Mrs Jourdon and Master Beattie (known as the Young Roscius) played at the Dunlop Street theatre. Jackson decided to expand the theatre in 1802 but instead moved to a new bigger premises in Queen Street in 1805. Unfortunately for Jackson, the Queen Street premises was destroyed by fire after a gas leak in 1829. In the meantime the Dunlop Street theatre was now run by John Henry Alexander as a pantomime venue. Alexander further expanded his theatre upon the demise of Jackson's Queen Street theatre.

== Controversy ==
Many of the Tobacco Lords profited from the use of slaves to pick their tobacco crop. As part of the Black Lives Matter campaign in 2020, many of Glasgow's streets in the Merchant City area – named after the Tobacco Lords – were unofficially renamed by anti-racism protesters.

The protesters placed alternative street names celebrating prominent black men and women alongside the official street names. Dunlop Street was alternatively named Joseph Knight Street, after the celebrated abolitionist, once a slave transported back to Scotland in 1769, who took his legal battle through the Scottish courts to make Scotland the first country in the world to ban slavery.
