= Jane Weir =

Scottish woman executed for witchcraft

Jane Weir or Jean Weir (died 1670), was a Scottish woman executed for witchcraft along with her brother.

== Early life ==
Weir was born near Carluke in Lanarkshire. Her brother was Major Thomas Weir a Calvinist, Occultist and former soldier.

== Confessions ==
Following his retirement in 1670, her brother became ill, suffered a mental break and began to confess to a depraved secret life of crime and vice. The Lord Provost initially found the confession implausible and took no action, but eventually both Jane and her brother were taken to the Edinburgh Tolbooth for interrogation.

While her brother Thomas now in his seventies, continued to expand on his confession, Jane gave an even more exaggerated history of witchcraft, sorcery and vice. in what today would be regarded as a shared paranoia.

== Trial ==
The trial began on 9 April 1670. Jane Weir confessed that their mother had been a witch who also taught her children. She further revealed that Thomas bore the mark of the Beast on his body and that they frequently roamed the countryside in a fiery coach.

== Death and burial ==
Both siblings were executed in 1670 and buried together at the base of the gallows at Shrub Hill, as was the custom of the time.
