= But n Ben A-Go-Go =

2000 novel by Matthew Fitt

- First edition (publ. Luath Press)
- Author: Matthew Fitt
- Language: English
- Publisher: Luath Press
- Publication date: 2000
- ISBN: 0-946487-82-0 (first edition)
- Dewey Decimal: 823.914
- LC Class: PR6056.I84 B88

But n Ben A-Go-Go is a science fiction work by Scots writer Matthew Fitt, notable for being entirely in the Scots language. The novel was first published in 2000.

According to the author, as many of the different varieties of Scots as possible were used, including many neologisms – imagining how Scots might develop by 2090. The lack of a glossary might be seen as a barrier, but most of the words should be accessible to most Scottish readers. The reviewer Stephen Naysmith describes the dialect used in the book as "a hybrid of Lallans, peppered with words from Dundee, Aberdeen and elsewhere". However, even for some people born in Scotland and familiar with Scots, the book is difficult to read and borrows liberally from the grammar of German and Dutch for many of the words.

== Plot ==
Set in the year 2090, the book depicts a future world where global warming has caused sea level to rise considerably. The Highlands of Scotland are the only unsubmerged part of Britain – the Highlands now being known as the Drylands. Damage to the ozone layer has resulted in much higher levels of UV light and so sunburn and skin cancer are serious issues – most people do not venture outside unless entirely necessary, and carry high factor suncream and anti-cancer kits. Most of the world's population were wiped out in "God's flood"; the survivors live in collections of floating oil-platform-like city structures, known as parishes. The story takes place around the seas and drylands that were once Scotland – initially Port, a collection of parishes (named after towns around Scotland) attached to what was once Greenock by underwater cables.

The Population of Port are watched constantly by a totalitarian government; there are class divides in the parishes (there is an underclass of Danish refugees living in many of the lower levels); the climate of Earth is now inhospitable. In addition to these problems, Senga, a new strain of HIV, infects much of the population. There is no cure, and the entire population is infected with the Mowdy virus (similar to HIV) and are dependent on government issued medication to suppress Senga. Senga also becomes active if individuals engage in sex – reproduction is performed using laboratory techniques, and only virtual sex is possible.

Anyone who develops Senga is put into isolation for the virus to run its course – these people are kistit – entombed in capsules in huge hospitals. Victims' thoughts are visualised by thochtscreens on each kist.

== Critical reception ==
The book has received a fair amount of attention, as much for its inventive use of Scots as for its plot. The following illustrate:

"Fitt creates a prose that crackles with energy and invention ... But n Ben A-Go-Go shows us that the Scots language can describe worlds as various and exotic as the imaginations of those who use it." Niall O'Gallagher, The List, 100 Best Scottish Books of all Time, 2005

"The plot has much of the imaginative power of Iain M Banks." Douglas Gifford, The Scotsman, November 2000

"While But n Ben A-Go-Go does have comic moments, the novel is far from a joke ... confronting relevant issues such as global warming, epidemics, and social division." Stephen Naysmith, Sunday Herald, August 2000

"Matthew Fitt has nearly accomplished something splendid: a novel composed in tough, readable Scots; more, a science fiction novel which projects this perennially 'dying' language into a future it is not supposed to possess." WN Herbert, Scotland on Sunday, October 2000
