= Digby Rumsey =

British film director and producer

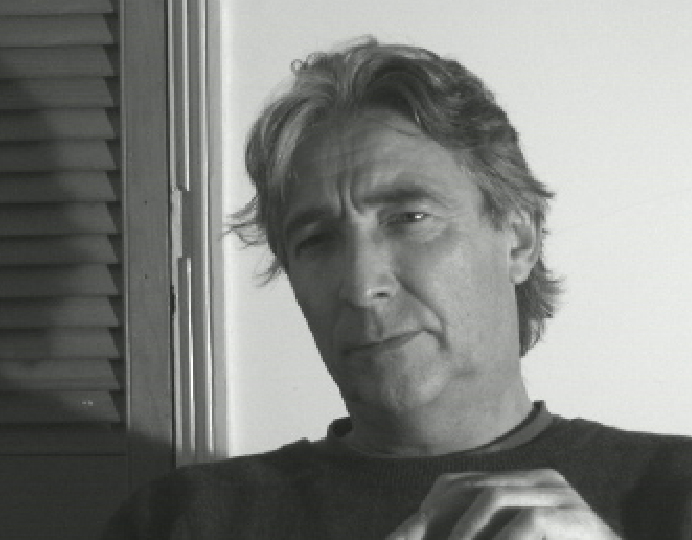
- Born: Digby Rumsey; 2 April 1952; Bournemouth, England
- Occupation: Filmmaker
- Years active: 1970–2014

Digby Rumsey (born 2 April 1952) is an English film director, producer, writer, cinematographer, editor, sound recordist and film diarist.

== Early life ==
Rumsey was born in Bournemouth on the south coast of England, the son of John (a chartered surveyor) and Joyce Rumsey. He was educated at Bradfield College in Berkshire before training at the London Film School. During this time he began work on his first film. Shot with three standard 8mm cameras, it is a surrealist, diary film entitled For All the Immigrants in England. He subsequently gained an MA in Independent Film at the London College of Printing.

== Career ==
=== 1970–1999 ===
Rumsey initially worked as an actor at the Quipu Basement Theatre in Greek Street, but after film school, he gained industry experience as an assistant editor and sound recordist. Crewing on several British Film Institute Production Board films, he worked with Terence Davies, Bill Douglas and Peter Greenaway.

In 1972 Rumsey set up Fantasy Films and over the following two decades specialised in adapting the work of Victorian and Edwardian fantasy writers such as Robert Louis Stevenson, Ernest Bramah and Lord Dunsany. He would later go on to adapt Nevil Shute's novel On the Beach.

In the mid-1970s Rumsey worked with the film & photography collective Amber Films in Newcastle. During this period he produced In the Twilight, which was showcased at the London Film Festival, and the 163-minute compilation Seven Years.

With the rapid growth of the Independent Sector in the UK, Rumsey was appointed the first salaried Co-ordinator of East Anglian Film-Makers, where he raised money for the group from Channel 4, the British Film Institute and Norwich City Council.

After the release of The Pledge by Twentieth Century-Fox in 1981, Rumsey spent the next year in Europe seeking co-production funds for his first feature film The History of the Devil. He was unsuccessful.

Returning to England, Rumsey worked as an editor at Anglia Television for several years before moving back to London in the late 1980s, continuing to work as a film editor for companies and broadcasters such as Channel 4, BBC, TWI, Mentorn and Fulcrum and many American broadcasters. Clocking up more than 150 credits, including Greed and Glory, The Thatcher Factor and Lloyd's of London.

Additionally he moved into directing, working in the corporate sector with clients like the Department of Trade and Industry (United Kingdom), Tate Gallery and Médecins Sans Frontières. On the home-front he continued editing magazine programmes such as the BBC's Gardeners’ World and Discovery's Mission Wild.

=== 2000–2014 ===
In 2000 Rumsey set up Auteur DVD, a Soho-based authoring house. This evolved into Auteur TV, a real time web streaming service for artists and film-makers around the world.

In 2005 Rumsey decided to concentrate on documentary production and spent a year living and working in India as a Director/Cinematographer. It was during this period that he made the political documentary Kashmir Under the Shadow of the Gun and the DVD collection Sketches of India.

On his return from India, Rumsey was diagnosed with an aggressive prostate cancer. Deciding to concentrate on a long-term ambition, Rumsey wrote the screenplay “Justified!” and set about seeking the finance for a feature-length adaptation of James Hogg’s Gothic novel The Private Memoirs and Confessions of a Justified Sinner. With rival companies all fighting for the same production finance, this film has still not been made. In the film Help! – and Redemption, Rumsey chronicled his experience of diagnosis, treatment and partial remission for this most common form of male cancer.

Having made three films based on the work of Lord Dunsany, in 2012 Rumsey embarked on a documentary about the life of this influential and contradictory Irish aristocrat. Shooting for the Butler was released in 2014.

Rumsey was a member of Directors UK and for many years an active Trade Union member on the Writers, Producers and Directors committee of BECTU. He represented the Union on the Working Group on Copyright and Technology for the British Copyright Council.

Rumsey was married once and had three children.

== Films ==
Dramas

Rumsey adapted three works by the prolific Irish writer, dramatist and poet Lord Dunsany (1878–1957 – full name: Edward Plunkett, 18th Baron of Dunsany). In Nature and Time (1975 – the first of the film-maker’s projects to be shot in 35mm) the titular mythical characters stride through London town, ending with a grim prediction about an increasingly urbanised world. 1978’s In the Twilight is set on a beautiful summer’s day in 1910 and features a man who falls overboard while out boating. While attempting to reach the surface, the man strikes his head on the keel and sinks to the bottom. In the ensuing twilight world he sees past scenes from his life. This film was selected as an “Outstanding Film of the Year” by the London Film Festival. Rumsey's third and final Dunsany adaptation was The Pledge (1981), based on the author's story “The Highwayman”. In 1790, the compatriots of an executed highwayman attempt to keep their word to him by cutting down his rotting corpse and interring it in an Archbishop's tomb, believing that only this course of action will free their friend's soul. Rated X, it was distributed by Twentieth Century-Fox.

Rumsey made two films inspired by the work of English author Ernest Bramah (1868–1942): The Moonlight Comb (1974) shows the film-maker taking five colleagues, costumes and props, to the rugged landscape of Wester Ross in Scotland. Living in an isolated cottage they attempt to film a Bramah story set in a mythical, medieval China but inevitably, everything that can go wrong does. Nevertheless, the project is saved by the humour of the cast. In Out of Reach (1980), Rumsey told the tale of a sad and lonely young poet who wishes to emulate his hero Thomas Chatterton. Rejected by his publishers, the poet retreats into a symbolic world, his mind filling with images of robber barons, medieval castles and magical swords. Tricked by a duplicitous sorcerer, he is convinced that if he could just travel to the Moon, he will obtain his heart's desire.

The Song of the Morrow (1998) is an adaptation of Robert Louis Stevenson's little-known prose poem of the same name. Set on a deserted beach and in a monastery, the Daughter of Duntreen has “no power upon the hour and no thought upon the morrow” and by the time the Daughter realises that she now has “the power” – the circle of life has turned again.

With The Red Box (2000), Rumsey creates a millennial adaptation of Nevil Shute's On the Beach, an account of the end of the world as seen through the eyes of a small community in Melbourne, Australia. The film combines actors in a blue screen studio with contemporary images in an examination of human nature, as each character deals differently with their impending doom.

In the 1974 satire The Heist, the film-maker takes centre-stage as he and an accomplice stage a robbery at the production offices of the British Film Institute in London. Ignored not only by the Head of Production but just about everyone else, they complete their heist – the booty consisting of film stock for future productions.

Documentaries Rumsey's documentary Fallacies of Vision (1981) attempts to demonstrate the way in which spaceship myths are created by taking a look at a UFO scare that occurred in the sleepy town of Warminster in 1965. Years later, the film-maker investigates the sightings along with local reporter, Kevin Mount, while simultaneously endeavouring to raise money for a feature film. In Colin Self – A Journey in that Direction (2004), Rumsey profiles this important English Pop Artist by positioning Self's work within the art world of the 1960s.

Rumsey made a number of films while living and travelling in India between 2005 and 2006: in Varanasi – City of Death (2005), the film-maker shows a day in the life of what has been claimed is the oldest city in the world (formerly Benares). Situated on the banks of River Ganga, the ‘ghats’ (or riverfront steps) are used both for daily religious observance and for the rites of Death. The film includes rare footage of these cremations. With his 39-minute documentary Kashmir – Under the Shadow of the Gun (2006), Rumsey describes life in this much-disputed, heavily militarised, India-administered region. The film recounts the history of the conflict as seen through the eyes of individuals who have been involved with the human rights abuses that have occurred repeatedly since 1987.

Avant-garde Made in collaboration with author Dennis Gray, Windows (1974) explores the inner space of a man staring at the world from his armchair. In a landscape of alienation and fear, the central character is on a quest – within himself. In God and the Evil (1986), inspired by Friedrich Nietzsche's story about “The Madman with the Lamp”, Rumsey assembles and layers words, images and locations in an attempt to prompt the viewer to reflect on the great opposing forces which have exercised human thought for millennia: the distinction between God and Man, and between Good and Evil.

Other Work Early in his career, Rumsey worked as an editor and sound recordist on Terence Davies’ Children (1976 – the first part of what would become the award-winning Terence Davies Trilogy) and sound recordist on Bill Douglas’ My Way Home (1978). Rumsey was again one of the sound recordists on Peter Greenaway's 1980 feature The Falls and Greenaway would subsequently co-edit Rumsey's 1981 drama The Pledge, for which Michael Nyman composed the score.

== Filmography ==
Short Dramas

- Nature and Time (1975)
- In the Twilight (1978)
- Out of Reach (1980)
- The Pledge (1981)
- The Song of the Morrow (1998)
- The Red Box (2000)

Avant-garde

- The Moonlight Comb (1974)
- Windows (1974)
- God and the Evil (1986)
- K.L. (We Live in the Dreams of Our Fathers) (1999)

Autobiographical Film Diaries

- For All the Immigrants in England (1972)
- The Heist (1974)
- A Catalogue of Adjusted Perception (1996)
- Help! (2008)

Documentaries

- But What about Tomorrow? (1980)
- Fallacies of Vision (1981)
- Between East and West – Istanbul (1998)
- Colin Self – A Journey in That Direction (2004)
- Varanasi – City of Death – (2005)
- Kashmir Earthquake 2005 (2005)
- Kashmir Under the Shadow of the Gun (2006)
- Sketches of India (DVD) (2006)
- Deal – England (2011)
- Help! and Redemption (2012)
- Shooting for the Butler (2014)

Static Films and Observations

- The Blue Mosque – Istanbul (1998)
- Eclipse (1999)
- Bhimsen Temple – Nepal (2005)
- The Shawl (2005)
- Monkeys and Prayer Wheels (2005)
- Sunset – Puerto Escondido (2012)

Other

- Seven Years (The Complete Works of Digby Rumsey 1971–1978) (1978)

As Editor (selected)

- Children (1976)
- At the Mercy of the Unscrupulous (1989)
- Artworld (13 eps, 1989)
- Blood on the Screens (1990)
- The Thatcher Factor (1990)
- Sportraits (1990)
- Lloyd's of London (1991)
- Greed and Glory: The Price of Freedom? (1992)
- Greed and Glory: Major Offenders (1992)
- The Great British Invention (1992)
- Dispatches – The Generation Game (1992)
- How It Happened (1993)
- Many Happy Returns (3 eps, 1997)
- The Man Who Loved China (1999)
- Fire in the Hills (1999)
- Secret History: Costa del Crime (3 eps, 2003)

As Sound Recordist (selected)

- Children (1976)
- My Way Home (1978)
- The Falls (1980)
