= Linguistic Survey of Scotland =

The Linguistic Survey of Scotland was a long-term project at the University of Edinburgh to cover the use of language in Scotland, including Scottish English, Scots and Scottish Gaelic.

The Survey began at a time when the modern subject of linguistics was evolving and the leaders accepted that the Survey would need to change over time to stay relevant to on-going linguistic work. The original intentions of the Survey were set out by Professor Angus McIntosh in the book Introduction to a Survey of Scottish Dialects. The book argued that different methods were appropriate for different aspects of the survey. Vocabulary was collected by indirect methods such as letters to local schoolteachers, to collect material more easily where there was less chance of a mistake by a non-linguist, whereas phonology and morphology were assessed directly by trained linguists.

The fieldwork for dialects of Scots and Scottish English was undertaken first. This period did not cover the Highlands or Outer Hebrides of Scotland, but it did cover a few sites in all six counties of Northern Ireland and in County Donegal in the Republic of Ireland, and numerous sites in the English counties of Cumberland and Northumberland.

The Highlands and Islands were later studied in terms of both Scottish Gaelic, and also in mixed use of English and Gaelic (referred to as "Highland English" and "Island English"). The results from this later period of fieldwork were published in five volumes in the 1990s by Cathair Ó Dochartaigh.

== Timeline of the Survey ==
- 1949: The project is instituted under the joint direction of the Heads of the Departments of English Language, Phonetics and Celtic at the University of Edinburgh.
- 1951: First questionnaire with 211 questions sent out by post to collect lexical data. Of around 3000 copies sent out, 1774 produced usable data.
- 1952: Publication of Introduction to a Survey of Scottish Dialects by Angus McIntosh.
- 1953: Second questionnaire with 207 questions sent for lexical data. This was sent to a smaller number of schools and produced 832 returns with usable data.
- 1955: Fieldwork began to collect phonological data. 250 localities were investigated with a questionnaire of 907 phonological items and 75 morphological items. Tape-recordings were taken.
- 1957: Publication of Vowel Systems of Scots dialects by JC Catford.
- 1965: The Survey is made into a department in the Faculty of Arts at the University of Edinburgh.
- 1969: Publication of An areal typology of isoglosses by HH Speitel. This argued that "the Scottish-English border is probably one of the most striking geographical linguistic divides in the English-speaking world".
- 1975–1985: Publication of the Scots sections in The Linguistic Atlas of Scotland by JY Mather and HH Speitel in three volumes.
  - 1975: Publication of Volume 1
  - 1977: Publication of Volume 2
  - 1985: Publication of Volume 3
- 1994–7: Publication of Survey of the Gaelic Dialects of Scotland by Cathair Ó Dochartaigh in five volumes.

== Bibliography ==
- Catford, JC (1957). "Vowel systems of Scots dialects". Transactions of the Philological Society. 56: 107–117. doi:10.1111/j.1467-968X.1957.tb00571.x.
- McIntosh, Angus (1952). Introduction to a Survey of Scottish Dialects. Edinburgh: T. Nelson.
- Petyt, Keith Malcolm (1980). The Study of Dialect: An introduction to dialectology. Andre Deutsch. ISBN 0233972129.
- Speitel, HH (1969). "An areal typology of isoglosses". Zeitschrift für Dialektologie und Linguistik. 1.
