= The Hoard of the Gibbelins =

Short story by Lord Dunsany

"The Hoard of the Gibbelins" is a fantasy short story by Anglo-Irish writer Lord Dunsany. It was first published in The Sketch in London and in The Book of Wonder in 1912. It was also reprinted in the anthology The Spell of Seven, edited by L. Sprague de Camp.

The story, only 4.5 pages long in paperback, tells of the exploits of Alderic, Knight of the Order of the City, to seek and purloin the fabled hoard of precious gems rumoured to be held in the castle of the Gibbelins. These strange creatures live in a land chained to the Earth across the river ocean, and they have built a tower at the narrowest point to attract humans, on whom they feed.

Alderic, acting on conflicting advice, captures a dragon and rides upon it to the riverbank. He swims the river, spends the night breaking into the supposed treasure-cellar with a mighty pickaxe, and finds the gems. But the Gibbelins immediately find, capture, and kill him. Dunsany ends the story quite abruptly at this point, saying "the tale is one of those that have not a happy ending".

== Influence ==
Dale Nelson has theorised that "The Hoard of the Gibbelins" was an influence on J. R. R. Tolkien's poem "The Mewlips", collected in The Adventures of Tom Bombadil. The Mewlips live outside the "known world" in damp cellars where they count their gold and eat whoever comes searching for it. Similarities of plot and character apart, Nelson describes story and poem as sharing a "charming quality of insincerity", as both warn of imaginary dangers.
