= Kings in Darkness =

"Kings in Darkness" is a sword and sorcery short story by English writer Michael Moorcock. It was first published in Science Fantasy No. 54 in 1962. It has been reprinted as part of the Elric sagas and also reprinted in the anthology The Spell of Seven, edited by L. Sprague de Camp.

== Plot summary ==
The story picks up the saga of Elric as he and Moonglum of Elwher barely escape with their lives from Nadsokor, the city of Beggars and find themselves in the cursed forest of Troos. Elric is able to collect various sorcerous herbs that grow only there, and they meet the young and beautiful Lady Zarozinia of Kaarlak, sole survivor of a massacre by the physically and mentally twisted Orgians. They agree to escort her to safety, but are further attacked by Orgians and escape, leaving their treasure behind.

The trio, now protected by Elric's magic, bluff their way into the citadel of the Orgians, in the guise of messengers of the Gods, but King Gutheran and his son Prince Hurd see through their lie and imprison the travellers.

Elric is chained at the entrance to the barrow, beneath which live the Hill-Folk, the undead ancestors of the Orgians. About to be eaten alive by the gibbering ghouls, he prays to Arioch the Demon God, who sends a lightning-bolt to shatter his chains, allowing his escape. Moonglum thus far has escaped capture, but Zarozinia has been imprisoned. She is released by Gutheran's brother, the blind minstrel Veerkad, who plans to sacrifice her and use her blood to complete a spell to raise the Hill-Folk. He is interrupted in this devilish work by Prince Hurd and it's Veerkad's blood that completes the magic. The Hill-Folk, led by their Hill-King, arise and invade the Great Hall to massacre the Orgians.

Gutheran, who fears the arrival of the Hill-King more than anything, dies of a seizure. Elric can do nothing against the Hill-King, who is proof against even his sword Stormbringer, but with Moonglum's aid, he lures the undead King into a blazing fire. As the Hill-King finally perishes and the massacre continues, the castle falls into blazing ruin and the trio make their escape from Org.
