= Joseph Knight (slave) =

Enslaved West African who gained freedom in Scotland

Joseph Knight (fl. 1769–1778) was a man born in Guinea (the general name of West Africa) and there seized into slavery. It appears that the captain of the ship which brought him to Jamaica there sold him to John Wedderburn of Ballindean, Scotland. Wedderburn had Knight serve in his household, and took him along when he returned to Scotland in 1769. On Knight leaving his service, Wedderburn had him arrested and brought before the local justices of the peace.

Inspired by Somersett's Case (1772) in which the courts had held that slavery did not exist under English common law, Knight resisted his claim. Knight won his claim after two appeals in a case that established the principle that Scots law would not uphold the institution of slavery (except in the case of enslaved colliers and salters, who had to wait until 1799 for emancipation).

== Early life ==
Joseph Knight was born in Guinea, according to the pleadings submitted on his behalf in the Court of Session; it is not known to which people, or what his original name was. He was transported to the British colony of Jamaica as a child, where he was sold as a slave to John Wedderburn of Ballendean.

== Knight v. Wedderburn ==
While in Scotland, Knight was baptised and married Ann Thompson, a servant of the Wedderburn family, with whom he had at least one child. He sought, and was refused permission by Wedderburn, to live with his wife in family. On Wedderburn refusing, Knight then left his service. Wedderburn appears to have been indignant, feeling that he had bestowed considerable gifts on Knight by educating him and taking care of him, and had him arrested. In 1774, Knight brought a claim before the justices of the peace court in Perth, a case that would be known as Knight v Wedderburn.

=== Appeal to the sheriff ===
When the justices of the peace found in favour of Wedderburn, Knight appealed to the Sheriff of Perth, John Swinton. He found that "the state of slavery is not recognised by the laws of this kingdom, and is inconsistent with the principles thereof: That the regulations in Jamaica, concerning slaves, do not extend to this kingdom." The defence of Knight in the Court of Session was mounted in general terms as a denunciation of slavery:

The means by which those who carried this child from his own country got him into their hands, cannot be known; because the law of Jamaica makes no inquiry into that circumstance. But, whether he was ensnared, or bought from his parents, the iniquity is the same. – That a state of slavery has been admitted of in many nations, does not render it less unjust. Child-murder, and other crimes of a deep dye, have been authorised by the laws of different states. Tyranny, and all sorts of oppression, might be vindicated on the same grounds. – Neither can the advantages procured to this country, by the slavery of the negroes, be hearkened to, as any argument in this question, as to the justice of it. Oppression and iniquity are not palliated by the gain and advantage acquired to the authors of them. But the expediency of the institution, even for the subjects of Great Britain, is much doubted of by those who are best acquainted with the state of the colonies; and some enlightened men of modern times have thought, that sugar and tobacco might be cultivated without the slavery of negroes.

=== Appeal to Court of Session ===
In 1777, Wedderburn appealed to the Court of Session, Scotland's supreme civil court, in Edinburgh and argued that Knight still owed him perpetual service and might be taken and sent back to Jamaica by force. The case came before the whole court of twelve judges (as was usual at that time) including Lord Kames, a prominent legal and social historian.

Knight's principal counsel were Allan Maconochie (later himself a judge as Lord Meadowbank), John Maclaurin (later himself a judge as Lord Dreghorn), and Andrew Crosbie. Henry Dundas, then Lord Advocate, also acted as one of Knight's counsel, in his private capacity as an advocate. They may have been assisted in their preparation for the case by James Boswell. "I cannot too highly praise the speech which Mr. Henry Dundas generously contributed to the cause of the sooty stranger", Boswell recalled, "I do declare that upon this memorable question he impressed me." Their argument was that "no man is by nature the property of another" and that, albeit under Jamaican law slavery was recognised, that could not extend to Scotland. Conversely, Wedderburn's counsel argued that commercial interests, which underpinned Scotland's prosperity, should prevail.

The Court of Session, by eight votes to four, sustained the sheriff's decision, which had held, "That the state of slavery is not recognised by the laws of this kingdom, and is inconsistent with the principles thereof: and found that the regulations in Jamaica, concerning slaves, do not extend to this kingdom; and repelled the defender's claim to perpetual service". It thus rejected Wedderburn's appeal. Lord Kames stated that "we sit here to enforce right not to enforce wrong". Lord Auchinleck, Boswell's father, said, "Although, in the plantations, they have laid hold of the poor blacks, and made slaves of them, yet I do not think that that is agreeable to humanity, not to say to the Christian religion. Is a man a slave because he is black? No. He is our brother; and he is a man, although not our colour; he is in a land of liberty, with his wife and his child: let him remain there." The Court thus held:

the dominion assumed over this Negro, under the law of Jamaica, being unjust, could not be supported in this country to any extent: That, therefore, the defender had no right to the Negro's service for any space of time, nor to send him out of the country against his consent: That the Negro was likewise protected under the act 1701, c.6. from being sent out of the country against his consent.

In effect, slavery was not recognised by Scots law. Fugitive slaves (or 'perpetual servants') could be protected by the courts if they wished to leave domestic service or resisted attempts to return them to slavery in the colonies.

== Later life ==
Knight was recognised as a free man. His wife had been in Wedderburn's service as a servant, but had been sacked by him following their marriage. At this point Knight and his family disappear from the record; nothing further is known of their lives or deaths.

== Legacy ==
In December 2022, Sir Geoff Palmer and the Lord President of the Court of Session, Lord Carloway, unveiled a plaque commemorating the 1778 case, which ruled that slavery was incompatible with Scots law.

== In popular culture ==
- Joseph Knight is a 2003 novel based on the freedman and his trial, written by James Robertson and published by Fourth Estate Ltd.
- The Trial of Joseph Knight, a radio play written by May Sumbwanyambe, was broadcast by BBC Radio 4 on 12 July 2018, starring Nana Amoo-Gottfried as Knight and Ron Donachie as Wedderburn.

On 22nd November 2009, episode 8 of A History of Scotland aired. Titled "The Price of Progress" in which Knight's case is documented. https://www.bbc.co.uk/programmes/p00574dk

== See also ==
- Colliers and Salters (Scotland) Act 1775
- Dunlop Street
- List of slaves
- Slavery at common law § Joseph Knight's case
