= Chu-Bu and Sheemish =

Short story by Lord Dunsany

Chu-Bu and Sheemish is a short story by Lord Dunsany. The tale was first published in The Book of Wonder (1912).

== Plot summary ==
An unnamed narrator tells the following story: Chu-Bu is the accustomed resident in a temple where he is worshipped. Sheemish is a freshly carved idol added to the same temple one day—and from that moment the two deities become jealous, taunt each other and attempt to outdo the other in achieving miracles. Eventually their combined efforts result in a minor earthquake which destroys the temple. Their worshippers each claim their preferred god has caused the earthquake, but all of them stay away and do not rebuild the temple out of fear of such powerful gods. The narrator remarks that he found the demolished, abandoned temple one day and that Sheemish had been smashed but Chu-bu was intact, found on his back with his hands and feet in the air. The narrator brought Chu-bu home, keeps him in that same position on his mantle, and every so often will offer token worship to Chu-bu to keep the god's spirits up.

== Themes ==
Alyssa House-Thomas has analysed the story as an example of Dunsany using Orientalism to create humour. She notes that the squabbling gods embody the colonialist clichés of irrationality and weakness, with their feeble insults and inability to defeat each other. By the end of the story, one is forgotten and the other reduced to a mantlepiece ornament, whom the narrator thinks nothing of removing hundreds of miles from his home. House-Thomas points out how this reflects justifications for imperialism such as indigenous peoples' alleged incapacity for self-rule and failure to preserve their heritage, necessitating Western intervention and curation. Although the story is humorous, it relies on Orientalist ideas that are, arguably, its chief meaning.

== Assessment ==
House-Thomas calls "Chu-Bu and Sheemish" probably the most famous of Dunsany's tales, and John Rateliff calls it "arguably his single best story", including "all that is best in his work without having any of the flaws" and being "a masterpiece of economy".
