= Matthew Fitt =

Scottish writer

Matthew Fitt (born 1968) is a Scots poet and novelist. He has translated several literary works into Scots.

== Early life ==
Fitt was born in 1968 in Dundee. His mother was a journalist, working for publications such as Mandy. His great-grandfather William Beharrie was a novelist who wrote in Scots.

In his final year of school, his teachers showed him the works of Robert Burns and Hugh MacDiarmid. After he graduated from university, he became a teacher but continued to write.

== Literary career ==
In 2002, together with James Robertson and Susan Rennie, he co-founded Itchy Coo, a publishing imprint and educational project to reintroduce schoolchildren to the Scots tongue.

His best known work and debut novel is But'n'Ben A-Go-Go, an ecofiction novel in Lowland Scots. Earlier works included The Hoose O Haivers, a loose retelling of the Metamorphoses of Ovid in Scots and The Smoky Smirr O Rain, a Scots anthology.

He wrote the lyrics to Icker in a Thrave, the 2007 Scots entry for the Liet-Lávlut song contest for minority languages in Europe. The tune was written by Simon Thoumire, and the song was performed by Mairi Campbell (singing), Kevin Mackenzie (guitar), Clare McLaughlin (fiddle), and Simon Thoumire (concertina).

Fitt has translated several Asterix books into Scots. The first was Asterix and the Picts (Asterix and the Pechts), published in 2013. He has also translated several Roald Dahl novels, including The Twits (The Eejits), George's Marvellous Medicine (Geordie’s Mingin Medicine) and Charlie and the Chocolate Factory (Chairlie and the Chocolate Works), and, in 2018, J. K. Rowling's Harry Potter and the Philosopher's Stane.

In May 2020, he was awarded the Scottish Book Trust's outstanding contribution to children's books award.

In December 2021, he became the cofounder and editor of Scots-language magazine Eemis Stane.

== Bibliography ==
- Pure Radge (1996). Kirkcaldy, Akros Publications. ISBN 0-86142-064-0
- Sairheid City (1999). Angus, Kettillonia Press. ISBN 1-902944-01-1
- Gaberlunzie Joe (Itchy Coo Series) (2002). Edinburgh, Black and White Publishing. ISBN 1-902927-57-5
- But'n'Ben A-Go-Go (2005). Dundee, Luath Press. ISBN 1-905222-04-1
- (with James Robertson) The Smoky Smirr O Rain: A Scots Anthology (Itchy Coo Series). Edinburgh, Black and White Publishing. (2003) ISBN 1-902927-81-8
- (with James Robertson and Bob Dewar) King O the Midden: Manky Mingin Rhymes in Scots (Itchy Coo Series). Edinburgh, Black and White Publishing. (2003) ISBN 1-902927-70-2
- (with James Robertson and Susan Rennie The Hoose O Haivers (Itchy Coo Series). Edinburgh, Black and White Publishing. (2002) ISBN 1-902927-44-3
- Time Tram Dundee . Dundee City Council by Waverley Books. (2006) ISBN 1-902407-37-7
