= James Robertson (novelist) =

Scottish writer

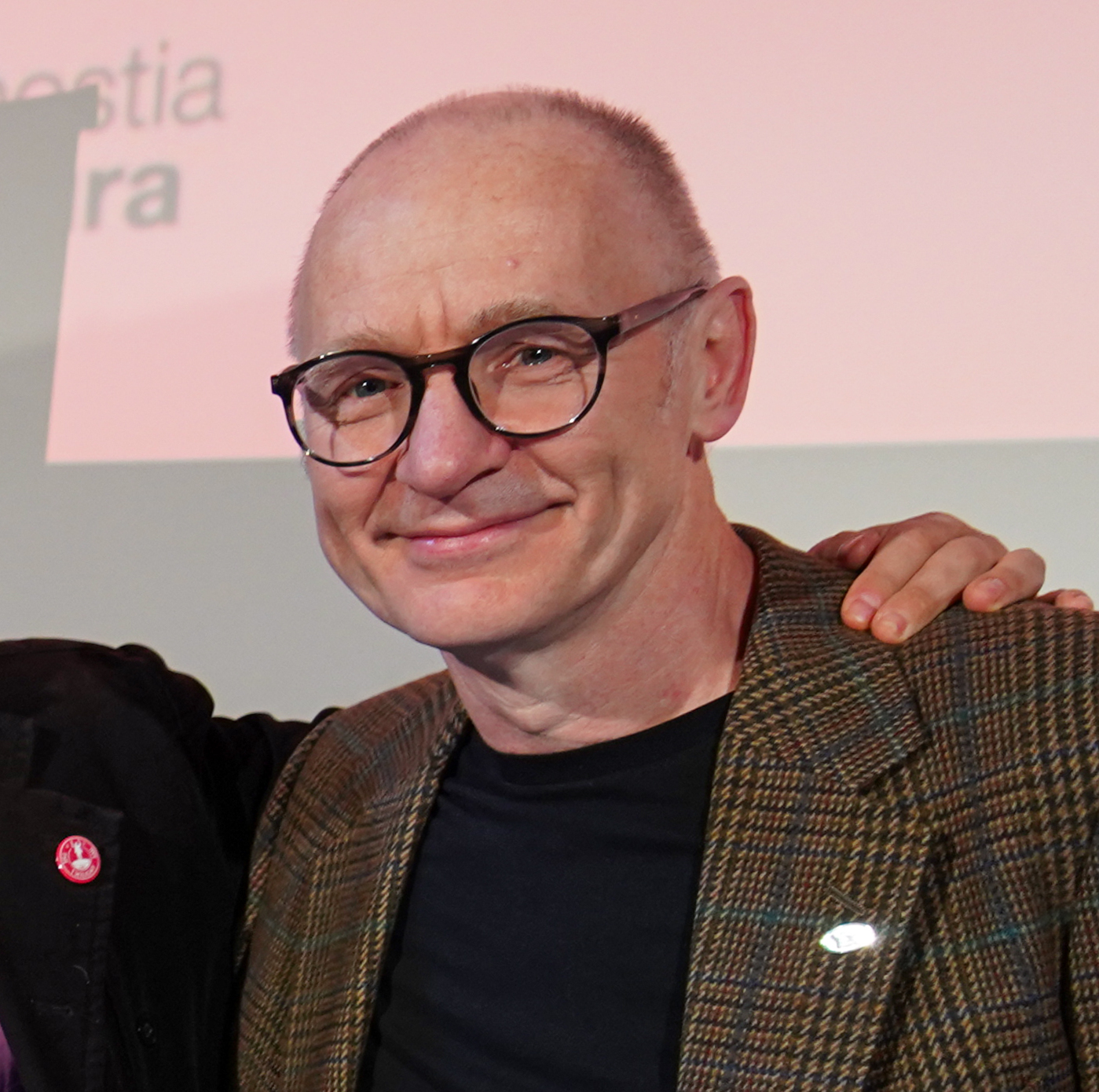
- Born: 14 March 1958
- Occupation: Writer
- Writing career
- Notable awards: honorary doctorate
- Website: three-six-five.net

James Robertson (born 1958) is a Scottish novelist, short story writer and poet. Robertson was born in Sevenoaks, England and grew up in Bridge of Allan, Stirlingshire. He has published seven novels: The Fanatic, Joseph Knight, The Testament of Gideon Mack, And the Land Lay Still, The Professor of Truth, To Be Continued, and News of the Dead. The Testament of Gideon Mack was long-listed for the 2006 Man Booker Prize. He has been shortlisted for Scotland's National Book Awards several times and won the Scottish Book of the Year in 2010 with And the Land Lay Still. In 2022, he won the Walter Scott Prize for News of the Dead.

Robertson also runs an independent publishing company called Kettillonia, and is a co-founder (with Matthew Fitt and Susan Rennie) and general editor of the Scots language imprint Itchy Coo (produced by Black & White Publishing), which produces books in Scots for children and young people.

== Early life ==
Robertson was born in Sevenoaks in Kent in 1958. At 6 years old, he moved with his family to Bridge of Allan in Scotland after his father took a job at a brickmaking company.

Educated at Glenalmond College and Edinburgh University, Robertson attained a PhD in history at Edinburgh on the novels of Walter Scott. He also spent an exchange period at the University of Pennsylvania in Philadelphia.

Robertson worked in a variety of jobs after leaving university, mainly in the book trade. He was a publisher's sales rep and later worked for Waterstone's Booksellers, first as a bookseller in Edinburgh and later as assistant manager of the Glasgow branch.

== Career ==
Robertson became a full-time author in the early 1990s. From 1993 to 1995 he was the first writer in residence at Brownsbank, the former home of the poet Hugh MacDiarmid near Biggar, now run by the Biggar Museum Trust. Robertson had already been heavily influenced by MacDiarmid and MacDiarmid's Scots language poetry prior to this appointment. His early short stories and first novel used contemporary and historical life in Edinburgh as a key theme, drawing on his experience of living there intermittently while working on his PhD and during the later 1990s before moving to Fife, and subsequently Angus. Each of his three novels has been influenced to a degree by where he was living when he wrote them. Joseph Knight is based on the true story of a slave brought from the Caribbean to Scotland, and the novel revolves primarily around the cities of Dundee, near where Robertson was then living, and Edinburgh. The Testament of Gideon Mack, meanwhile, is set in a fictional village that resembles the villages of eastern Scotland bordering the Highlands between Dundee and Aberdeen where Robertson currently lives. His novels, therefore, feature the Scottish urban and rural landscape of the 17th and 20th centuries.

While Robertson's first two novels featured the Scottish past (The Fanatic merged a story of contemporary Scotland in the months surrounding the 1997 general election with a story of Scotland in the 17th century, while Joseph Knight was purely historical) he is not a historical novelist, and Gideon Mack was set in Scotland between the 1950s and the present day.

In November 2004 Robertson was the first, and to date, only writer-in-residence at the newly opened Scottish Parliament building. The appointment was for three days only and was negotiated by the Scottish Book Trust and the Parliament. On each day Robertson delivered a 'masterclass' on different aspects of the relationship between Scottish literature and politics. These later became three essays which were published, along with eleven sonnets reflecting his experience of the new building, in Voyage of Intent: Sonnets and Essays from the Scottish Parliament (Luath/Scottish Book Trust, 2005).

Since about 2000 Robertson has been involved with Itchy Coo, a publisher of children's books in the Scots language. Initially funded by the Scottish Arts Council, Itchy Coo has proved to be a popular enterprise. Robertson's interest in and use of Scots also features heavily in his poetry and prose, and notably in his first two novels, which blend modern English with Scots. Katie’s Moose won the early years category in the Royal Mail Awards for Scottish Children's Books 2007.

In 2010 he became the first writer-in-residence at Edinburgh Napier University.

In 2011 Robertson contributed a short story "The Quaking of the Aspen" to an anthology in support of the Woodland Trust. The anthology, Why Willows Weep, has so far helped The Woodland Trust plant approximately 50,000 trees, and is to be re-released in paperback format in 2016.

In 2014, Robertson published 365 Stories, a collection of stories that are each 365 words in length, written over the course of a year.

In 2021, Hamish Hamilton published Robertson's novel News of the Dead. The book, which went on to win the Walter Scott Prize, tells three different stories, one set in Pictish times, one in the early nineteenth century, and one in the modern day. The stories share a location, the fictional Glen Conach. It contains many Scots words and does not contain a glossary, instead referring the reader to the online site Dictionaries of the Scots Language.

== Personal life ==
Robertson is married to Marianne.

In 2010, Robertson was reported as living in Newtyle, a village that is approximately 10 miles north of Dundee. Together, with his wife, they were living in a converted villa that was once a branch of the Royal Bank of Scotland.

He has stated that the Complete Poems of Hugh MacDiarmid changed his life. He has also cited Robert Louis Stevenson, Walter Scott, Charles Dickens, Don DeLillo, Raymond Carver, Flann O’Brien and Flannery O’Connor as important literary influences.

== Awards and recognition ==
His novel The Testament of Gideon Mack was longlisted for the 2006 Man Booker Prize.

In 2010, his novel And the Land Lay Still won Scotland's National Book Awards Scottish Book of the Year.

Robertson was awarded an honorary degree by The Open University at the degree ceremony in the Usher Hall, Edinburgh on 21 June 2014.

In October 2020, he won the Janet Paisley Services to Scots Award in the Scots Language Awards.

In 2022 he won the Walter Scott Prize for News of the Dead.

== Publications ==
=== Novels ===
- The Fanatic (Fourth Estate, 2000)
- Joseph Knight (Fourth Estate, 2003)
- The Testament of Gideon Mack (Hamish Hamilton, 2006)
- And the Land Lay Still (Hamish Hamilton, 2010)
- The Professor of Truth (Hamish Hamilton, 2013)
- To Be Continued… (Hamish Hamilton, 2016)
- News of the Dead (Hamish Hamilton, 2021)

=== Non-fiction ===
- Michael Marra: Arrest This Moment (Big Sky Press, 2017)

=== Short stories ===
- Close (Black and White Publishing, 1991)
- The Ragged Man's Complaint (Black and White Publishing, 1993)
- Republics of the Mind (Black and White Publishing, 2012)
- 365: Stories (Hamish Hamilton, 2014)
- The Mannie and Ither Stories (Association for Scottish Literary Studies, 2019)
- Ghosts of Ukraine (a Short Story about the Russo-Ukrainian War, 2025)

=== Poetry ===
- Sound-Shadow (Black and White Publishing, 1995)
- I Dream of Alfred Hitchcock (Kettillonia pamphlet, 1999)
- Stirling Sonnets (Kettillonia pamphlet, 2001)
- Voyage of Intent: Sonnets and Essays from the Scottish Parliament (Scottish Book Trust and Luath Press, 2005)
- Hem and Heid (Kettillonia pamphlet, 2009)
- When the Ile Rins Oot (Kettillonia pamphlet, 2014)

=== Children's books ===
In Scots unless indicated.

- A Scots Parliament (English, Itchy Coo, 2002)
- Eck the Bee: A Scots Word Activity Book (Ann Matheson and James Robertson, Itchy Coo, 2002)
- The Hoose o Haivers (Matthew Fitt, Susan Rennie and James Robertson, Itchy Coo, 2002)
- Tam O'Shanter's Big Night Oot: Wee Plays in Scots (edited by Robertson and Fitt, Itchy Coo, 2003)
- King o the Midden: Manky Minging Rhymes in Scots (edited by Robertson and Fitt, Itchy Coo, 2003) (also in a digest format, The Wee King o the Midden, Itchy Coo, 2008)
- The Smoky Smirr O Rain: A Scots Anthology (edited by Robertson and Fitt, Itchy Coo, 2003)
- A Moose in the Hoose: A Scots Counting Book (Robertson and Fitt, Itchy Coo, 2006)
- Katie's Ferm: A Hide & Seek Book for Wee Folk (Robertson and Fitt, Itchy Coo, 2007)
- Blethertoun Braes: More Manky Minging Rhymes in Scots (edited by Robertson and Fitt, Itchy Coo, 2007)
- A Wee Book O Fairy Tales in Scots (Robertson and Fitt, Itchy Coo, 2007)
- Rabbie's Rhymes: Robert Burns for Wee Folk (edited by Robertson and Fitt, Itchy Coo, 2008)
- Katie's Moose: A Keek-a-boo Book for Wee Folk (Robertson and Fitt, Itchy Coo, 2008)
- The Sleekit Mr Tod by Roald Dahl (Scots translation, Itchy Coo, 2008)
- Winnie the Pooh by A. A. Milne (Scots translation, Itchy Coo, 2008)
- Katie's Year: Aw the Months for Wee Folk (Itchy Coo, 2009)
- Precious and the Puggies by Alexander McCall Smith (Scots translation, Itchy Coo, 2010)
- The Hoose at Pooh's Neuk by A.A. Milne (Scots translation, Itchy Coo, 2010)
- Katie's Zoo: A Day Oot for Wee Folk (Itchy Coo, 2010)
- The Gruffalo in Scots by Julia Donaldson (Itchy Coo, 2012)
- The Gruffalo's Wean by Julia Donaldson (Itchy Coo, 2013)
- Room on the Broom in Scots by Julia Donaldson (Itchy Coo, 2014)
- Whit the Clockleddy Heard by Julia Donaldson (Itchy Coo, 2015)
- The Reiver Rat by Julia Donaldson (Itchy Coo, 2015)
- The Troll and the Kist o Gowd by Julia Donaldson (Itchy Coo, 2016)
- Paddington in Scots by Michael Bond (Itchy Coo, 2020)
- Giraffes Cannae Dance by Giles Andreae (Itchy Coo, 2021)
- Stick Mannie by Julia Donaldson (Itchy Coo, 2022)
- The Smeds and the Smoos in Scots by Julia Donaldson (Itchy Coo, 2023)

=== Edited works ===
- My Schools and Schoolmasters by Hugh Miller (Black and White Publishing, 1993)
- Scenes and Legends of the North of Scotland by Hugh Miller (Black and White Publishing, 1994)
- A Tongue in yer Heid (Black and White Publishing, 1994)
- Dictionary of Scottish Quotations (with Angela Cran) (Mainstream Publishing, 1996)
- Selected Poems of Robert Fergusson (Birlinn, 2000)

=== Translations ===
- Fae the Flouers o Evil (Scots trans. Robertson of Baudelaire) (Kettillonia Pamphlet)
- La A'Bhreitheanais or The Day o Judgment (Scots trans. Robertson of Dugald Buchanan) (Kettillonia Pamphlet)

=== Websites ===
- scotgeog.com (A website spin-off from the Testament of Gideon Mack, 2006)

=== Essays ===
- Story behind The Professor of Truth (Online Essay, 2013)
