= The Spell of Seven =

1965 anthology of fantasy short stories edited by L. Sprague de Camp

- Cover of the first edition.
- Editor: L. Sprague de Camp
- Illustrator: Virgil Finlay
- Cover artist: Virgil Finlay
- Language: English
- Genre: Fantasy
- Publisher: Pyramid Books
- Publication date: 1965
- Publication place: United States
- Media type: Print (paperback)
- Pages: 192
- Preceded by: Swords and Sorcery
- Followed by: The Fantastic Swordsmen

The Spell of Seven is an anthology of fantasy short stories in the sword and sorcery subgenre, edited by L. Sprague de Camp and illustrated by Virgil Finlay. It was first published in paperback by Pyramid Books in June 1965, and reprinted in December 1969. It was the second such anthology assembled by de Camp, following his Swords and Sorcery (1963).

== Summary ==
The book collects seven sword and sorcery tales by various authors, with an overall introduction by de Camp.

== Contents ==
- "Introduction: Wizards and Warriors" (L. Sprague de Camp)
- "Bazaar of the Bizarre" (Fritz Leiber)
- "The Dark Eidolon" (Clark Ashton Smith)
- "The Hoard of the Gibbelins" (Lord Dunsany)
- "The Hungry Hercynian" (L. Sprague de Camp)
- "Kings in Darkness" (Michael Moorcock)
- "Mazirian the Magician" (Jack Vance)
- "Shadows in Zamboula" (Robert E. Howard)

== Relation to other works ==
Four of the seven authors represented in the anthology were members of the Swordsmen and Sorcerers' Guild of America (SAGA), a somewhat informal literary group of fantasy authors active from the 1960s to the 1980s, making the book a precursor of the five Flashing Swords! anthologies of SAGA-member works edited by Lin Carter from 1973 to 1981.
