= Swords and Sorcery =

1963 anthology of fantasy short stories edited by L. Sprague de Camp

- Cover of the first edition.
- Editor: L. Sprague de Camp
- Illustrator: Virgil Finlay
- Cover artist: Virgil Finlay
- Language: English
- Genre: Fantasy
- Publisher: Pyramid Books
- Publication date: 1963
- Publication place: United States
- Media type: Print (paperback)
- Pages: 186
- Followed by: The Spell of Seven

Swords and Sorcery is an anthology of fantasy short stories in the sword and sorcery subgenre, edited by L. Sprague de Camp and illustrated by Virgil Finlay. It was first published in paperback by Pyramid Books in 1963, but most of the stories were originally from 1930s pulp magazines. This was the first sword and sorcery anthology ever assembled, and was followed by three additional such anthologies edited by de Camp. It has also been translated into German.

== Summary ==
The book collects eight sword and sorcery tales by various authors, with an overall introduction by de Camp. The piece by Poul Anderson introduced his Cappen Varra character, later one of the foundational characters of the Thieves' World shared world anthologies edited by Robert Asprin and Lynn Abbey.

== Contents ==
- "Introduction: Heroic Fantasy" (L. Sprague de Camp)
- "The Valor of Cappen Varra" (Poul Anderson)
- "The Distressing Tale of Thangobrind the Jeweler" (Lord Dunsany)
- "Shadows in the Moonlight" (Robert E. Howard)
- "The Citadel of Darkness" (Henry Kuttner)
- "While the Sea King's Away" (Fritz Leiber)
- "The Doom that Came to Sarnath" (H. P. Lovecraft)
- "Hellsgarde" (C. L. Moore)
- "The Testament of Athammaus" (Clark Ashton Smith)
