= The Testament of Gideon Mack =

Book by James Robertson

- Cover
- Author: James Robertson
- Illustrator: James Robertson
- Language: English
- Genre: Philosophy/Religion/Tragedy
- Publisher: Penguin Books (UK)
- Publication date: 2006
- Publication place: United Kingdom
- Media type: Paperback
- Pages: 389
- ISBN: 978-0-14-102335-9
- OCLC: 77013330

The Testament of Gideon Mack is a novel written by the Scottish author James Robertson, first published in 2006. It pays conscious homage to ideas and themes originally explored with powerful effect in the novel The Private Memoirs and Confessions of a Justified Sinner (1824) by the Scottish novelist, essayist and poet James Hogg. Set in present day Scotland, Robertson's story of a contemporary minister of the Church of Scotland, Gideon Mack, who essentially doubts the existence of God, and thus his entire vocation, involves a wide variety of themes including questions of philosophy, tragedy, and the nature of father and son relationships. It was long-listed for the 2006 Man Booker Prize.

== Synopsis ==
The main story of The Testament is set within a framing narrative which concerns a publisher who recollects the "strange disappearance" of the novel's main character, Gideon Mack, and the discovery of Mack's "last testament". The testament itself comprises the main narrative. It recounts the life of its author, a son of the manse (meaning the son of a minister of the Scottish Kirk), who has followed in his father’s steps, eventually becoming minister to the small town of Monimaskit. Since Gideon does not, however, believe in God as such, he becomes increasingly disillusioned with his existence, until an accident sends him tumbling into a local gorge. Believed to be dead, he emerges three days later, claiming to have met and conversed with the Devil, who has confirmed several of his doubts. After scandalising and alienating his friends, the parish, and the Kirk at large, Gideon once again disappears, leaving his written account for posterity.

The epilogue to the novel is presented as the report of the freelance journalist who first brought the manuscript to the publisher’s attention. He interviews several of the inhabitants of Monimaskit who were mentioned in Gideon’s testament.

== Themes ==
The novel explores the interplay of religion, faith, and wider culture, and the sense of alienation from, or absence of, God often evident in the modern world. Gideon’s encounter with the Devil in some ways becomes the denouement of his life, finally providing him with a perspective from which to understand the world, and his place in it. The conflicting and cordial relations which Gideon holds with those around him recur frequently throughout the novel, but it is only after his experience, when the conflicts become predominant, that he seems able to approach true happiness. The issue of belief within modernity receives sharp focus in the question of whether or not Gideon is insane, or whether he did actually meet the Devil. This debate is further complicated in the epilogue, which gives a third person overview of Gideon’s story, and suggests that he may, to some extent, be an unreliable narrator.

== Reception ==
The novel received a positive review in The Guardian. In his review, Irvine Welsh wrote that the novel "cements" Robertson's position as "[...] one of the foremost Scottish [...] writers".

The book was long-listed for the Booker Prize.
