= Biggar Museum Trust =

Charitable trust operating a museum in Biggar, South Lanarkshire, Scotland

Biggar Museum Trust (BMT) is an independent charity based in and around the town of Biggar in South Lanarkshire, Scotland.

The museum trust was created by Brian Lambie, an avid collector of bric-a-brac, whose collection outgrew his home. His collection of artefacts from the area ranged over 40 years, and he initially founded Biggar's Gladstone Court Museum. Lambie later helped create six museums that were then overseen by the BMT. It became apparent to the Trustees that the buildings were not able to meet modern requirements, were difficult to access, and expensive to maintain and develop.

In 2010 an opportunity arose to acquire a large site in the centre of the town, and a project to create a new museum to bring the collections together and meet current requirements and visitor aspirations. The cost of the project was £2.2 million, of which more than half was raised from within the town and scattered rural community of the area. Together with funding from the Clyde Wind Farm Community Fund, South Lanarkshire LEADER, Museums Galleries Scotland, and a number of private trusts.

Biggar & Upper Clydesdale Museum opened to visitors on 28 July 2015. It has a historical gallery illustrating the history of the area from early times up to the 20th century, a street of shops recreated from the town and furnished from the collection, and a special exhibition room which can house items loaned from national collections.

BMT is also responsible for

- Holy Trinity Chapel an Oxford Movement restored chapel built to serve Lamington House [now demolished] about 3 miles (ca. 5 km) from Biggar.

Biggar also contains The Puppet Theatre and the Corn Exchange Theatre and Art Gallery. Biggar has strong connections with William Wallace, with a small bridge in the town being associated with him, although his connection to Lanark is better known.
