= Scots language =

West Germanic language

Scots
- Lowland Scots; Broad Scots
- (Braid) Scots; Lallans; Doric
- A sign near Drummore, Wigtownshire with the Scots phrase "haste ye back", meaning "come back soon"
- Pronunciation: [skɔts]
- Native to: United Kingdom, Republic of Ireland
- Region: Scotland: Scottish Lowlands, Northern Isles, Caithness, Arran and Campbeltown; Ulster (Ireland): Counties Down, Antrim, Londonderry, Donegal and Armagh
- Ethnicity: Scots
- Native speakers: 1,508,540 able to speak Scots (2022); 55,817 report speaking Scots at home (2011)
- Language family: Indo-European: Germanic; West Germanic; North Sea Germanic; Anglo-Frisian; Anglic; Scots
- Early forms: Old English: Northumbrian Old English; Early Middle English; Early Scots; Middle Scots
- Dialects: Central; Southern; Northern; Insular; Ulster
- Writing system: Latin

Official status
- Official language in: Scotland
- Recognised minority language in: Northern Ireland (as Ulster Scots); Republic of Ireland (County Donegal; also as Ulster Scots)

Language codes
- ISO 639-2: sco
- ISO 639-3: sco
- Glottolog: scot1243
- ELP: Scots
- Linguasphere: 52-ABA-aa
- The proportion of respondents in the 2011 census in Scotland aged 3 and above who stated that they can speak Lowland Scots

- The proportion of respondents in the 2011 census in Northern Ireland aged 3 and above who stated that they can speak Ulster Scots Scots is classified as vulnerable by the UNESCO Atlas of the World's Languages in Danger (2010).

Scots (Note: The endonym for Scots is Scots [skɔts].) is an Anglic language variety of West Germanic origin descended from Early Middle English. Thus, Modern Scots is a sister language of Modern English. Scots is classified as an official language of Scotland, a regional or minority language of Europe, and a vulnerable language by UNESCO. In a Scottish census from 2022, over 1.5 million people in Scotland (of its total population of 5.4 million people) reported being able to speak Scots.

Most commonly spoken in the Scottish Lowlands, the Northern Isles of Scotland, and northern Ulster in Ireland (where the local dialect is known as Ulster Scots), it is sometimes called Lowland Scots, to distinguish it from Scottish Gaelic, the Celtic language that was historically restricted to most of the Scottish Highlands, the Hebrides, and Galloway after the sixteenth century; or Broad Scots, to distinguish it from Scottish Standard English. Many Scottish people's speech exists on a dialect continuum ranging between Broad Scots and Scottish Standard English.

Given that there are no universally accepted criteria for distinguishing a language from a dialect, scholars and other interested parties often disagree about whether Scots is a dialect of English or a separate language.

== Nomenclature ==
Native speakers sometimes refer to their vernacular as braid Scots (or "broad Scots" in English) or use a dialect name such as the "Doric" or the "Buchan Claik". The old-fashioned Scotch, an English loan, occurs occasionally, especially in Ulster. The term Lallans, a variant of the Modern Scots word lawlands [ˈlo̜ːlən(d)z, ˈlɑːlənz], is also used, though this is more often taken to mean the Lallans literary form. Scots in Ireland is known in official circles as Ulster-Scots (Ulstèr-Scotch in revivalist Ulster-Scots) or "Ullans", a recent neologism merging Ulster and Lallans.

=== Etymology ===
Scots is a contraction of Scottis, the Older Scots and northern version of late Old English: Scottisc (modern English "Scottish"), which replaced the earlier i-mutated version Scyttisc. Before the end of the fifteenth century, English speech in Scotland was known as "English" (written Ynglis or Inglis at the time), whereas "Scottish" (Scottis) referred to Gaelic. By the beginning of the fifteenth century, the English language used in Scotland had arguably become a distinct language, albeit one lacking a name which clearly distinguished it from all the other English variants and dialects spoken in Britain. From 1495, the term Scottis was increasingly used to refer to the Lowland vernacular and Erse, meaning "Irish", was used as a name for Gaelic. For example, towards the end of the fifteenth century, William Dunbar was using Erse to refer to Gaelic and, in the early sixteenth century, Gavin Douglas was using Scottis as a name for the Lowland vernacular. The Gaelic of Scotland is now usually called Scottish Gaelic.

== History ==
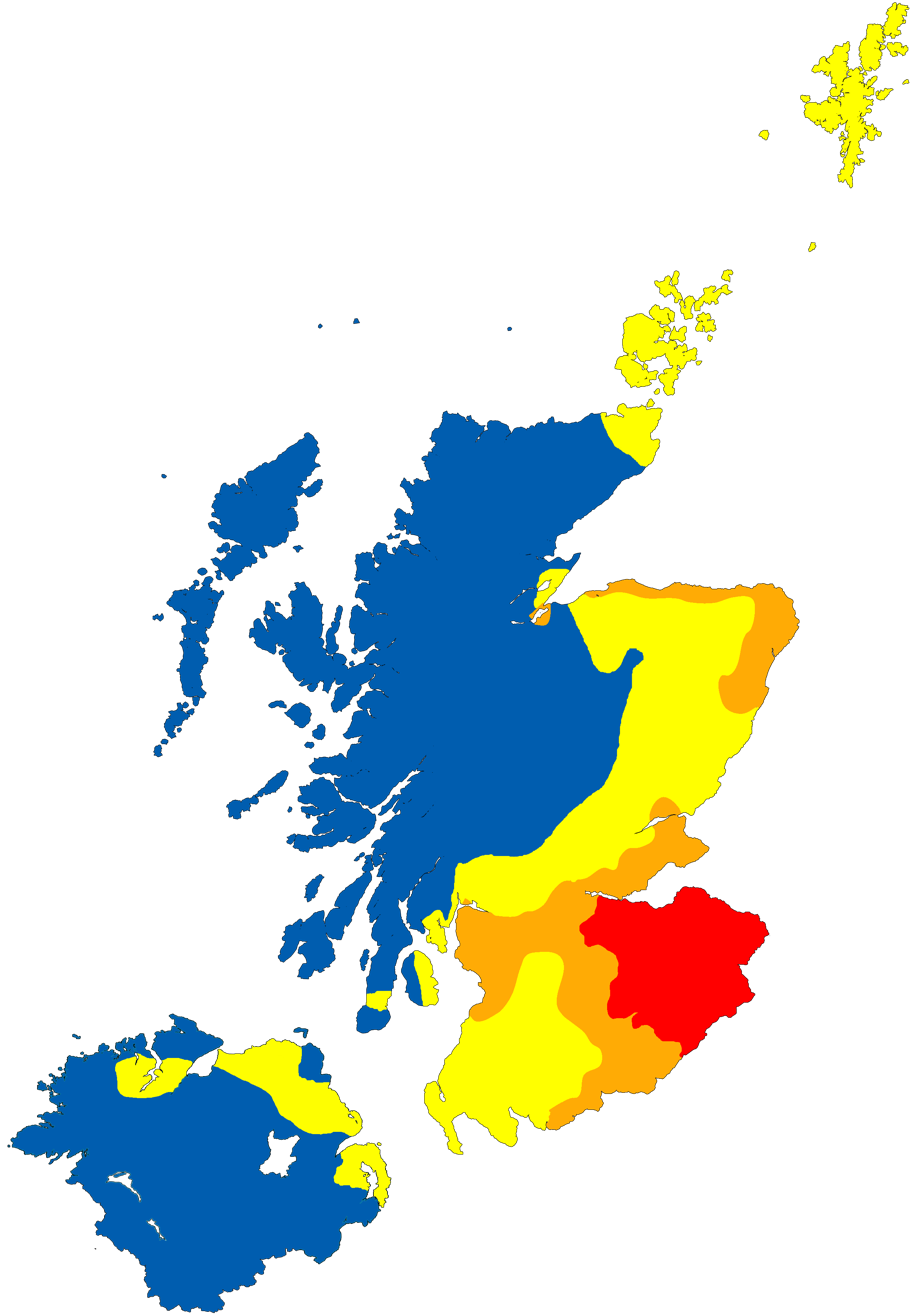
The growth and distribution of Scots in Scotland and Ulster: Old Northumbrian by the beginning of the 9th century in the northern portion of the kingdom of Northumbria, now part of southern Scotland Early Scots by the beginning of the 15th century Modern Scots by the mid-20th century

Northumbrian Old English had been established in what is now southeastern Scotland as far as the River Forth by the seventh century, as the region was part of the Anglo-Saxon kingdom of Northumbria. Some historians have traditionally argued that the regions later known as Lothian and the Scottish Borders became attached to the Kingdom of Scotland in the tenth and early eleventh centuries, but this is no longer accepted and the takeover that does take place is not fully evident until the twelfth century and probably incomplete until at least the thirteenth century. The common use of English remained largely confined to Lothian and the Borders until the thirteenth century, where the local varieties were reshaped in response to migration from the Scandinavian-influenced North and Midlands of England that came with the foundation of the first burghs in the twelfth and thirteenth centuries. The Scots language scholar Robert McColl Millar framed Early Scots as a koine of the varieties of English spoken in Bernicia and the Danelaw that had been brought to the new burghs.

Later influences on the development of Scots came from the Romance languages via ecclesiastical and legal Latin, Norman French, and later Parisian French, due to the Auld Alliance. Additionally, there were Dutch and Middle Low German influences due to trade with and immigration from the Low Countries. Scots also includes loan words in the legal and administrative fields resulting from contact with Middle Irish, and reflected in early medieval legal documents. Contemporary Scottish Gaelic loans are mainly for geographical and cultural features, such as cèilidh, loch, whisky, glen and clan. Cumbric and Pictish, the medieval Brittonic languages of Northern England and Scotland, are the suspected source of a small number of Scots words, such as lum (derived from Cumbric) meaning "chimney". From the thirteenth century, the Early Scots language spread further into Scotland via the burghs, which were proto-urban institutions first established by King David I. In fourteenth-century Scotland, the growth in prestige of Early Scots and the complementary decline of French made Scots the prestige dialect of most of eastern Scotland. By the sixteenth century, Middle Scots had established orthographic and literary norms largely independent of those developing in England.

From 1610 to the 1690s during the Plantation of Ulster, some 200,000 Scots-speaking Lowlanders settled as colonists in Ulster in Ireland. In the core areas of Scots settlement, Scots outnumbered English settlers by five or six to one.

The name Modern Scots is used to describe the Scots language after 1700.

A seminal study of Scots was undertaken by JAH Murray and published as Dialect of the Southern Counties of Scotland. Murray's results were given further publicity by being included in Alexander John Ellis's book On Early English Pronunciation, Part V alongside results from Orkney and Shetland, as well as the whole of England. Murray and Ellis differed slightly on the border between English and Scots dialects.

Scots was studied alongside English and Scots Gaelic in the Linguistic Survey of Scotland at the University of Edinburgh, which began in 1949 and began to publish results in the 1970s. Also beginning in the 1970s, the Atlas Linguarum Europae studied the Scots language used at 15 sites in Scotland, each with its own dialect. As of November 2022, Scots is represented on the Scientific Committee of the Atlas Linguarum Europae by David Clement of the University of Glasgow.

=== Language shift ===
From the mid-sixteenth century, written Scots was increasingly influenced by the developing Standard English of Southern England due to developments in royal and political interactions with England. When William Flower, an English herald, spoke with Mary of Guise and her councillors in 1560, they first used the "Scottyshe toung". As he found this hard to understand, they switched into her native French. King James VI, who in 1603 became James I of England, observed in his work Some Reulis and Cautelis to Be Observit and Eschewit in Scottis Poesie that "For albeit sindrie hes written of it in English, quhilk is lykest to our language..." (For though several have written of (the subject) in English, which is the language most similar to ours...). However, with the increasing influence and availability of books printed in England, most writing in Scotland came to be done in the English fashion. In his first speech to the English Parliament in March 1603, King James VI and I declared, "Hath not God first united these two Kingdomes both in Language, Religion, and similitude of maners?". Following James VI's move to London, the Protestant Church of Scotland adopted the 1611 Authorized King James Version of the Bible; subsequently, the Acts of Union 1707 led to Scotland joining England to form the Kingdom of Great Britain, having a single Parliament of Great Britain based in London. After the Union and the shift of political power to England, the use of Scots was discouraged by many in authority and education, as was the notion of "Scottishness" itself. Many leading Scots of the period, such as David Hume, defined themselves as Northern British rather than Scottish. They attempted to rid themselves of their Scots in a bid to establish standard English as the official language of the newly formed union. Nevertheless, Scots was still spoken across a wide range of domains until the end of the eighteenth century. Frederick Pottle, the twentieth-century biographer of James Boswell (1740–1795), described James's view of the use of Scots by his father Alexander Boswell (1706–1782) in the eighteenth century while serving as a judge of the Supreme Courts of Scotland:

He scorned modern literature, spoke broad Scots from the bench, and even in writing took no pains to avoid the Scotticisms which most of his colleagues were coming to regard as vulgar.

However, others did scorn Scots, such as Scottish Enlightenment intellectuals David Hume and Adam Smith, who went to great lengths to get rid of every Scotticism from their writings. Following such examples, many well-off Scots took to learning English through the activities of those such as Thomas Sheridan, who in 1761 gave a series of lectures on English elocution. Charging a guinea at a time (about £200 in today's money), they were attended by over 300 men, and he was made a freeman of the City of Edinburgh. Following this, some of the city's intellectuals formed the Select Society for Promoting the Reading and Speaking of the English Language in Scotland. These eighteenth-century activities would lead to the creation of Scottish Standard English. Scots remained the vernacular of many rural communities and the growing number of urban working-class Scots.

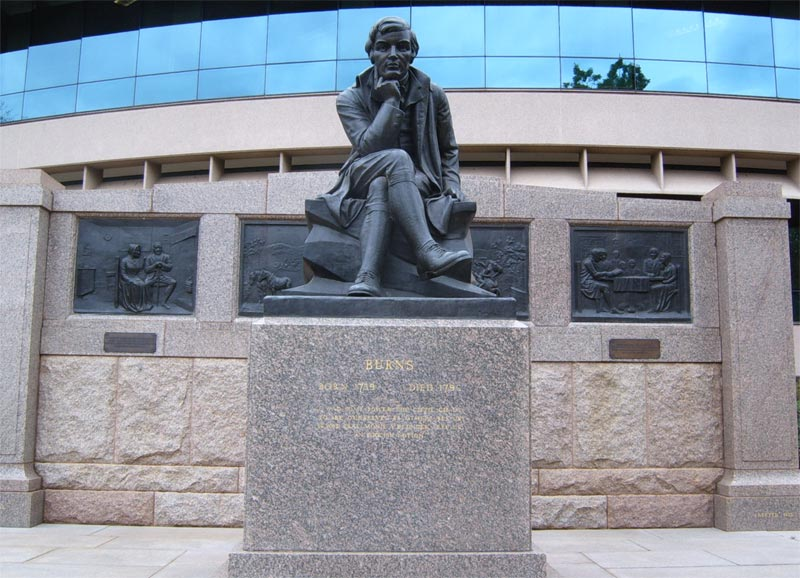
Statue of Robert Burns in Canberra, Australia

In the eighteenth and nineteenth centuries, the use of Scots as a literary language was revived by several prominent Scotsmen such as Robert Burns. Such writers established a new cross-dialect literary norm.

Scots terms were included in the English Dialect Dictionary, edited by Joseph Wright. Wright had great difficulty in recruiting volunteers from Scotland, as many refused to cooperate with a venture that regarded Scots as a dialect of English, and he obtained enough help only through the assistance from a Professor Shearer in Scotland. Wright himself rejected the argument that Scots was a separate language, saying that this was a "quite modern mistake".

During the first half of the twentieth century, knowledge of eighteenth- and nineteenth-century literary norms waned, and as of 2006, there is no institutionalised standard literary form. By the 1940s, the Scottish Education Department's language policy was that Scots had no value: "it is not the language of 'educated' people anywhere, and could not be described as a suitable medium of education or culture". Students reverted to Scots outside the classroom, but the reversion was not complete. What occurred, and has been occurring ever since, is a process of language attrition, whereby successive generations have adopted more and more features from Standard English. This process has accelerated rapidly since widespread access to mass media in English and increased population mobility became available after the Second World War. It has recently taken on the nature of wholesale language shift, sometimes also termed language change, convergence or merger. By the end of the twentieth century, Scots was at an advanced stage of language death over much of Lowland Scotland. Residual features of Scots are often regarded as slang. A 2010 Scottish Government study of "public attitudes towards the Scots language" found that 64% of respondents (around 1,000 individuals in a representative sample of Scotland's adult population) "don't really think of Scots as a language", also finding "the most frequent speakers are least likely to agree that it is not a language (58%) and those never speaking Scots most likely to do so (72%)".

=== Decline in status ===
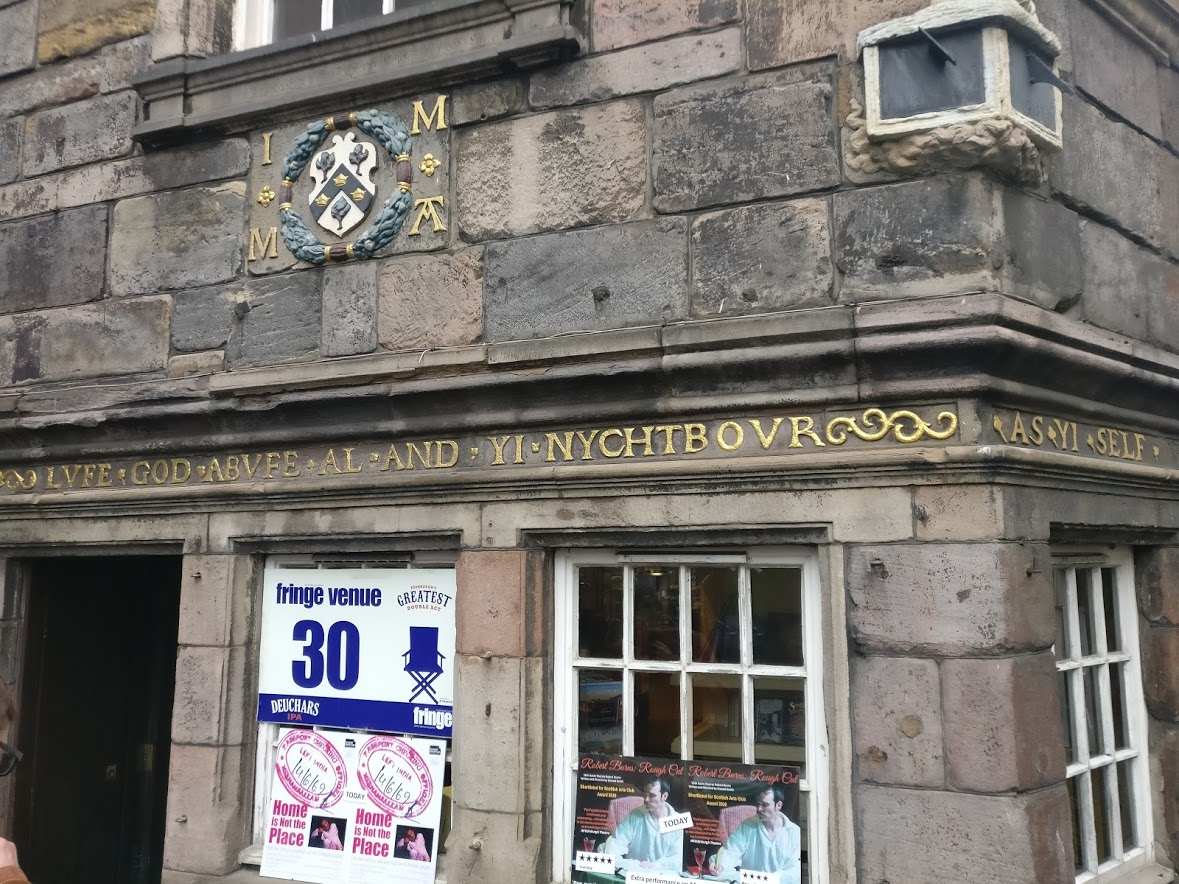
Lufe God abufe al and yi nychtbour as yi self ("Love God above all and thy neighbour as thyself"), an example of Early Scots, on John Knox House, Edinburgh

Before the Treaty of Union 1707, when Scotland and England joined to form the Kingdom of Great Britain, there is ample evidence that Scots was widely held to be an independent sister language forming a pluricentric diasystem with English.

German linguist Heinz Kloss considered Modern Scots a Halbsprache ('half language') in terms of an abstand and ausbau languages framework, although today in Scotland most people's speech is somewhere on a continuum ranging from traditional broad Scots to Scottish Standard English. Many speakers are diglossic and may be able to code-switch along the continuum depending on the situation. Where on this continuum English-influenced Scots becomes Scots-influenced English is difficult to determine. Because standard English now generally has the role of a Dachsprache ('roofing language'), disputes often arise as to whether the varieties of Scots are dialects of Scottish English or constitute a separate language in their own right.

The UK government now accepts Scots as a regional language and has recognised it as such under the European Charter for Regional or Minority Languages.

Notwithstanding the UK government's and the Scottish Executive's obligations under part II of the European Charter for Regional or Minority Languages, the Scottish Executive recognises and respects Scots (in all its forms) as a distinct language, and does not consider the use of Scots to be an indication of poor competence in English.

Evidence for its existence as a separate language lies in the extensive body of Scots literature, its independent – if somewhat fluid – orthographic conventions, and in its former use as the language of the original Parliament of Scotland. Because Scotland retained distinct political, legal, and religious systems after the Union, many Scots terms passed into Scottish English.

== Classification ==
Given that there are no universally accepted criteria for distinguishing a language from a dialect, scholars and other interested parties often disagree about the linguistic, historical and social status of Scots, particularly its relationship to English. Although a number of paradigms for distinguishing between languages and dialects exist, they often render contradictory results. Broad Scots is at one end of a bipolar linguistic continuum, with Scottish Standard English at the other. Scots is sometimes regarded as a variety of English, though it has its own distinct dialects; other scholars treat Scots as a distinct Germanic language, in the way that Norwegian is closely linked to but distinct from Danish.

== Language revitalisation ==
William Wye Smith's The New Testament in Braid Scots

During the 2010s, increased interest was expressed in the language.

=== Education ===
The status of the language was raised in Scottish schools, with Scots being included in the new national school curriculum. Previously in Scotland's schools there had been little education taking place through the medium of Scots, although it may have been covered superficially in English lessons, which could entail reading some Scots literature and observing the local dialect. Much of the material used was often Standard English disguised as Scots, which caused upset among proponents of Standard English and proponents of Scots alike. One example of the educational establishment's approach to Scots is, "Write a poem in Scots. (It is important not to be worried about spelling in this – write as you hear the sounds in your head.)", whereas guidelines for English require teaching pupils to be "writing fluently and legibly with accurate spelling and punctuation".

A course in Scots language and culture delivered through the medium of Standard English and produced by the Open University (OU) in Scotland, the Open University's School of Languages and Applied Linguistics as well as Education Scotland became available online for the first time in December 2019.

=== Government ===
In the 2011 Scottish census, a question on Scots language ability was featured. In the 2022 census conducted by the Scottish Government, a question in relation to the Scots language was also featured. It was found that 1,508,540 people reported that they could speak Scots, with 2,444,659 reporting that they could speak, read, write or understand Scots, approximately 45% of Scotland's 2022 population. The Scottish Government set its first Scots Language Policy in 2015, in which it pledged to support its preservation and encourage respect, recognition and use of Scots. The Scottish Parliament website also offers some information on the language in Scots.

In September 2024, experts of the Council of Europe called on the UK Government to "boost support for regional and minority languages", including the Scots Language.

In June 2025 the Scottish Parliament passed the Scottish Languages Act 2025 that made Scots an official language of Scotland, along with Scots Gaelic and introduced educational standards for the language.

=== Media ===
The serious use of the Scots language for news, encyclopaediae, documentaries, etc., remains rare. It is reportedly reserved for niches where it is deemed acceptable, e.g. comedy, Burns Night or traditions' representations.

Since 2016, the newspaper The National has regularly published articles in the language. The 2010s also saw an increasing number of English books translated in Scots and becoming widely available, particularly those in popular children's fiction series such as The Gruffalo, Harry Potter, Diary of a Wimpy Kid, and several by Roald Dahl and David Walliams. In 2021, the music streaming service Spotify created a Scots language listing.

The Ferret, a UK-based fact-checking service, wrote an exploratory article in December 2022 to address misconceptions about the Scots language to improve public awareness of its endangered status.

== Geographic distribution ==
In Scotland, Scots is spoken in the Scottish Lowlands, the Northern Isles, Caithness, Arran and Campbeltown. In Ulster, the northern province in Ireland, its area is usually defined through the works of Robert John Gregg to include the counties of Down, Antrim, Londonderry and Donegal (especially in East Donegal and Inishowen). More recently, the Fintona-born linguist Warren Maguire has argued that some of the criteria that Gregg used as distinctive of Ulster-Scots are common in south-west Tyrone and were found in other sites across Northern Ireland investigated by the Linguistic Survey of Scotland. Dialects of Scots include Insular Scots, Northern Scots, Central Scots, Southern Scots and Ulster Scots.

It has been difficult to determine the number of speakers of Scots via census, because many respondents might interpret the question "Do you speak Scots?" in different ways. Campaigners for Scots pressed for this question to be included in the 2001 UK National Census. The results from a 1996 trial before the Census, by the General Register Office for Scotland (GRO), suggested that there were around 1.5 million speakers of Scots, with 30% of Scots responding "Yes" to the question "Can you speak the Scots language?", but only 17% responding "Aye" to the question "Can you speak Scots?". It was also found that older, working-class people were more likely to answer in the affirmative. The University of Aberdeen Scots Leid Quorum performed its own research in 1995, cautiously suggesting that there were 2.7 million speakers, though with clarification as to why these figures required context.

The GRO questions, as freely acknowledged by those who set them, were not as detailed and systematic as those of the University of Aberdeen, and only included reared speakers (people raised speaking Scots), not those who had learned the language. Part of the difference resulted from the central question posed by surveys: "Do you speak Scots?". In the Aberdeen University study, the question was augmented with the further clause "... or a dialect of Scots such as Border etc.", which resulted in greater recognition from respondents. The GRO concluded that there simply was not enough linguistic self-awareness amongst the Scottish populace, with people still thinking of themselves as speaking badly pronounced, grammatically inferior English rather than Scots, for an accurate census to be taken. The GRO research concluded that "[a] more precise estimate of genuine Scots language ability would require a more in-depth interview survey and may involve asking various questions about the language used in different situations. Such an approach would be inappropriate for a Census." Thus, although it was acknowledged that the "inclusion of such a Census question would undoubtedly raise the profile of Scots", no question about Scots was, in the end, included in the 2001 Census. The Scottish Government's Pupils in Scotland Census 2008 found that 306 pupils spoke Scots as their main home language. A Scottish Government study in 2010 found that 85% of around 1000 respondents (being a representative sample of Scotland's adult population) claim to speak Scots to varying degrees.

The 2011 UK census was the first to ask residents of Scotland about Scots. A campaign called Aye Can was set up to help individuals answer the question. The specific wording used was "Which of these can you do? Tick all that apply" with options for "Understand", "Speak", "Read" and "Write" in three columns: English, Scottish Gaelic and Scots. Of approximately 5.1 million respondents, about 1.2 million (24%) could speak, read and write Scots, 3.2 million (62%) had no skills in Scots and the remainder had some degree of skill, such as understanding Scots (0.27 million, 5.2%) or being able to speak it but not read or write it (0.18 million, 3.5%). There were also small numbers of Scots speakers recorded in England and Wales on the 2011 Census, with the largest numbers being either in bordering areas (e.g. Carlisle) or in areas that had recruited large numbers of Scottish workers in the past (e.g. Corby or the former mining areas of Kent). In the 2022 census conducted by the Scottish Government, it was found that 1,508,540 people reported that they could speak Scots, with 2,444,659 reporting that they could speak, read, write or understand Scots, approximately 45% of Scotland's 2022 population.

== Literature ==
Among the earliest Scots literature is John Barbour's Brus (fourteenth century), Wyntoun's Cronykil and Blind Harry's The Wallace (fifteenth century). From the fifteenth century, much literature based on the Royal Court in Edinburgh and the University of St Andrews was produced by writers such as Robert Henryson, William Dunbar, Gavin Douglas and David Lyndsay. The Complaynt of Scotland was an early printed work in Scots. The Eneados is a Middle Scots translation of Virgil's Aeneid, completed by Gavin Douglas in 1513.

After the seventeenth century, anglicisation increased. At the time, many of the oral ballads from the borders and the North East were written down. Writers of the period were Robert Sempill, Robert Sempill the younger, Francis Sempill, Lady Wardlaw and Lady Grizel Baillie.

In the eighteenth century, writers such as Allan Ramsay, Robert Burns, James Orr, Robert Fergusson and Walter Scott continued to use Scots – Burns's "Auld Lang Syne" is in Scots, for example. Scott introduced vernacular dialogue to his novels. Other well-known authors like Robert Louis Stevenson, William Alexander, George MacDonald, J. M. Barrie and other members of the Kailyard school like Ian Maclaren also wrote in Scots or used it in dialogue.

In the Victorian era popular Scottish newspapers regularly included articles and commentary in the vernacular, often of unprecedented proportions.

In the early twentieth century, a renaissance in the use of Scots occurred, its most vocal figure being Hugh MacDiarmid whose benchmark poem "A Drunk Man Looks at the Thistle" (1926) did much to demonstrate the power of Scots as a modern idiom. Other contemporaries were Douglas Young, John Buchan, Sydney Goodsir Smith, Robert Garioch, Edith Anne Robertson and Robert McLellan. The revival extended to verse and other literature.

In 1955, three Ayrshire men – Sandy MacMillan, an English teacher at Ayr Academy; Thomas Limond, noted town chamberlain of Ayr; and A. L. "Ross" Taylor, rector of Cumnock Academy – collaborated to write Bairnsangs ("Child Songs"), a collection of children's nursery rhymes and poems in Scots. The book contains a five-page glossary of contemporary Scots words and their pronunciations.

Alexander Gray's translations into Scots constitute the greater part of his work, and are the main basis for his reputation.

In 1983, William Laughton Lorimer's translation of the New Testament from the original Greek was published.

Scots is sometimes used in contemporary fiction, such as the Edinburgh dialect of Scots in Trainspotting by Irvine Welsh (later made into a motion picture of the same name).

But'n'Ben A-Go-Go by Matthew Fitt is a cyberpunk novel written entirely in what Wir Ain Leed ("Our Own Language") calls "General Scots". Like all cyberpunk work, it contains imaginative neologisms.

The Rubaiyat of Omar Khayyam was translated into Scots by Rab Wilson and published in 2004. Alexander Hutchison has translated the poetry of Catullus into Scots, and in the 1980s, Liz Lochhead produced a Scots translation of Tartuffe by Molière. J. K. Annand translated poetry and fiction from German and Medieval Latin into Scots.

The strip cartoons Oor Wullie and The Broons in the Sunday Post use some Scots. In 2013, Susan Rennie translated the first of a series of Tintin adventures into Scots as The Derk Isle, and in 2018, Harry Potter and the Philosopher's Stane, a Scots translation of the first Harry Potter book, Harry Potter and the Philosopher's Stone, was published by Matthew Fitt.

== Phonetics ==
Scottish poet Christine De Luca speaking the Shetland dialect of Scots

=== Vowels ===
The vowel system of Modern Scots:

Aitken	IPA	Common spellings
1	short /əi/ long /aɪ/	i-e, y-e, ey
2	/i/	ee, e-e, ie
3	/ei/ (Note: With the exception of North Northern dialects this vowel has generally merged with vowels 2, 4 or 8.)	ei, ea
4	/e/	a-e, #ae
5	/o/	oa, o-e
6	/u/	ou, oo, u-e
7	/ø/ (Note: Merges with vowels 15. and 8. in central dialects and vowel 2 in Northern dialects.) (Note: Also /(j)u/ or /(j)ʌ/ before /k/ and /x/ depending on dialect.)	ui, eu
8	/eː/	ai, #ay
8a	/əi/ (Note: Vowels 8a and 10 are ultimately the same vowel in Modern Scots.)	i-e, y-e, ey
9	/oe/	oi, oy
10	/əi/	i-e, y-e, ey
11	/iː/	#ee, #ie
12	/ɑː, ɔː/	au, #aw
13	/ʌu/ (Note: Monophthongisation to /o/ may occur before /k/.)	ow, #owe
14	/ju/	ew
15	/ɪ/	i
16	/ɛ/	e
17	/ɑ, a/	a
18	/ɔ/ (Note: Some mergers with vowel 5.)	o
19	/ʌ/	u

Vowel length is usually conditioned by the Scottish vowel length rule.

=== Consonants ===
		Labial	Dental	Alveolar	Post- alveolar	Palatal	Velar	Glottal
Nasal		m		n			ŋ (Note: Spelt ⟨ng⟩, always /ŋ/.)	
Stop		p b		t d (Note: /t/ may be a glottal stop between vowels or word final. In Ulster dentalised pronunciations may also occur, also for /d/.)	tʃ dʒ (Note: The cluster ⟨nch⟩ is usually realised /nʃ/ e.g. brainch ("branch"), dunch ("push"), etc.)		k ɡ (Note: In Northern dialects, the clusters ⟨kn⟩ and ⟨gn⟩ may be realised as /kn/, /tn/ and /ɡn/ e.g. knap ("talk"), knee, knowe ("knoll"), etc.)	ʔ
Fricative		f v	θ ð (Note: Spelt ⟨th⟩. In Mid Northern varieties an intervocalic /ð/ may be realised /d/. Initial ⟨th⟩ in thing, think and thank, etc. may be /h/.)	s z (Note: Both /s/ and /z/ may be spelt ⟨s⟩ or ⟨se⟩. ⟨z⟩ is seldom used for /z/ but may occur in some words as a substitute for the older ⟨ȝ⟩ (yogh) realised /jɪ/ or /ŋ/. For example: brulzie ("broil"), gaberlunzie (a beggar) and the names Menzies, Finzean, Culzean, Mackenzie etc.)	ʃ ʒ	ç (Note: Spelt ⟨ch⟩, also ⟨gh⟩. Medial ⟨cht⟩ may be /ð/ in Northern dialects. loch ("fjord" or "lake"), nicht ("night"), dochter ("daughter"), dreich ("dreary"), etc. Similar to the German Nacht. The spelling ⟨ch⟩ is realised /tʃ/ word initially or where it follows ⟨r⟩ e.g. airch ("arch"), mairch ("march"), etc.)	x	h
Approximant	median			ɹ (Note: Spelt ⟨r⟩ and pronounced in all positions, i.e. rhotically. The phoneme /r/ is most commonly realised as an approximant [ɹ], although an alveolar tap [ɾ] is also common, especially among older speakers in rural areas. The realisation as a trill [r] is obsolete and only sporadically used for emphasis.)		j	ʍ (Note: ⟨w⟩ /w/ and ⟨wh⟩ /ʍ/, older and peripheral /xw/, do not merge. Northern dialects also have /f/ for /xw/, and the Outer Islands have merged /kw/ into /xw/. The cluster ⟨wr⟩ may be realised /wr/, more often /r/, but may be /vr/ in Northern dialects e.g. wrack ("wreck"), wrang ("wrong"), write, wrocht ("worked"), etc.) w	
Approximant	lateral			l (Note: In many dialects velarised /ɫ/ in most or all contexts.)				
Trill				r				

== Orthography ==
The orthography of Early Scots had become more or less standardised by the middle to late sixteenth century. After the Union of the Crowns in 1603, the Standard English of England came to have an increasing influence on the spelling of Scots through the increasing influence and availability of books printed in England. After the Acts of Union in 1707 the emerging Scottish form of Standard English replaced Scots for most formal writing in Scotland. The eighteenth-century Scots revival saw the introduction of a new literary language descended from the old court Scots, but with an orthography that had abandoned some of the more distinctive old Scots spellings and adopted many standard English spellings. Despite the updated spelling, however, the rhymes make it clear that a Scots pronunciation was intended. These writings also introduced what came to be known as the apologetic apostrophe, generally occurring where a consonant exists in the Standard English cognate. This Written Scots drew not only on the vernacular, but also on the King James Bible, and was heavily influenced by the norms and conventions of Augustan English poetry. Consequently, this written Scots looked very similar to contemporary Standard English, suggesting a somewhat modified version of that, rather than a distinct speech form with a phonological system which had been developing independently for many centuries. This modern literary dialect, "Scots of the book" or Standard Scots, once again gave Scots an orthography of its own, lacking neither "authority nor author". This literary language used throughout Lowland Scotland and Ulster, embodied by writers such as Allan Ramsay, Robert Fergusson, Robert Burns, Sir Walter Scott, Charles Murray, David Herbison, James Orr, James Hogg and William Laidlaw among others, is well described in the 1921 Manual of Modern Scots.

Other authors developed dialect writing, preferring to represent their own speech in a more phonological manner rather than following the pan-dialect conventions of modern literary Scots, especially for the northern and insular dialects of Scots.

During the twentieth century, a number of proposals for spelling reform were presented. Commenting on this, John Corbett (2003: 260) writes that "devising a normative orthography for Scots has been one of the greatest linguistic hobbies of the past century". Most proposals entailed regularising the use of established eighteenth- and nineteenth-century conventions, in particular, the avoidance of the apologetic apostrophe, which represented letters that were perceived to be missing when compared to the corresponding English cognates but were never actually present in the Scots word. For example, in the fourteenth century, Barbour spelt the Scots cognate of "taken" as tane. It is argued that, because there has been no k in the word for over 700 years, representing its omission with an apostrophe is of little value. The current spelling is usually taen.

Through the twentieth century, with the decline of spoken Scots and knowledge of the literary tradition, phonetic (often humorous) representations became more common.

== Grammar ==
Modern Scots follows the subject–verb–object sentence structure like Standard English. However, the word order Gie's it (Give us it) vs. "Give it to me" may be preferred. The indefinite article a may be used before both consonants and vowels. The definite article the is used before the names of seasons, days of the week, many nouns, diseases, trades and occupations, sciences and academic subjects. It is also often used in place of the indefinite article and instead of a possessive pronoun. Scots includes some irregular plurals such as ee/een ("eye/eyes"), cauf/caur ("calf/calves"), horse/horse ("horse/horses"), cou/kye ("cow/cows") and shae/shuin ("shoe/shoes") that survived from Old English into Modern Scots, but have become regularised plurals in Standard Modern English – ox/oxen and child/children being exceptions. Nouns of measure and quantity remain unchanged in the plural. The relative pronoun is that for all persons and numbers, but may be elided. Modern Scots also has a third adjective/adverb this-that-yon/yonder (thon/thonder) indicating something at some distance. Thir and thae are the plurals of this and that respectively. The present tense of verbs adheres to the Northern subject rule whereby verbs end in -s in all persons and numbers except when a single personal pronoun is next to the verb. Certain verbs are often used progressively and verbs of motion may be dropped before an adverb or adverbial phrase of motion. Many verbs have strong or irregular forms which are distinctive from Standard English. The regular past form of the weak or regular verbs is -it, -t or -ed, according to the preceding consonant or vowel. The present participle and gerund in are now usually /ən/ but may still be differentiated /ən/ and /in/ in Southern Scots, and /ən/ and /ɪn/ in Northern Scots. The negative particle is na, sometimes spelled nae, e.g. canna ("can't"), daurna ("daren't"), michtna ("mightn't").

Adverbs usually take the same form as the verb root or adjective, especially after verbs. Examples include Haein a real guid day ("Having a really good day") and She's awfu fauchelt ("She's awfully tired").

== Sample texts ==
Two translations of the same New Testament passage, published in 1904 and 1985 respectively.

From The Four Gospels in Braid Scots (William Wye Smith. 1904.):

Noo the nativitie o' Jesus Christ was this gate: whan his mither Mary was mairry't till Joseph, 'or they cam thegither, she was fund wi' bairn o' the Holie Spirit.
Than her guidman, Joseph, bein an upricht man, and no desirin her name sud be i' the mooth o' the public, was ettlin to pit her awa' hidlins.
But as he had thir things in his mind, see! an Angel o' the Lord appear't to him by a dream, sayin, "Joseph, son o' Dauvid, binna feared to tak till ye yere wife, Mary; for that whilk is begotten in her is by the Holie Spirit.
"And she sall bring forth a son, and ye sal ca' his name Jesus; for he sal save his folk frae their sins."
Noo, a' this was dune, that it micht come to pass what was said by the Lord throwe the prophet,
"Tak tent! a maiden sal be wi' bairn, and sal bring forth a son; and they wull ca' his name Emmanuel," whilk is translatit, "God wi' us."
Sae Joseph, comin oot o' his sleep, did as the Angel had bidden him, and took till him his wife.
And leev'd in continence wi' her till she had brocht forth her firstborn son; and ca'd his name Jesus.

— Matthew 1:18–21

From The New Testament in Scots (William Laughton Lorimer. 1985.)

This is the storie o the birth o Jesus Christ. His mither Mary wis trystit til Joseph, but afore they war mairriet she wis fund tae be wi bairn bi the Halie Spírit. Her husband Joseph, honest man, hed nae mind tae affront her afore the warld an wis for brakkin aff their tryst hidlinweys; an sae he wis een ettlin tae dae, whan an angel o the Lord kythed til him in a draim an said til him, "Joseph, son o Dauvit, be nane feared tae tak Mary your trystit wife intil your hame; the bairn she is cairrein is o the Halie Spírit. She will beir a son, an the name ye ar tae gíe him is Jesus, for he will sauf his fowk frae their sins."

Aa this happent at the wurd spokken bi the Lord throu the Prophet micht be fulfilled: Behaud, the virgin wil bouk an beir a son, an they will caa his name Immanuel – that is, "God wi us".

Whan he hed waukit frae his sleep, Joseph did as the angel hed bidden him, an tuik his trystit wife hame wi him. But he bedditna wi her or she buir a son; an he caa'd the bairn Jesus.

— Matthew 1:18–21

== See also ==
- Bungi Creole of the Canadian Metis people of Scottish/British descent
- Doric dialect (Scotland)
- Glasgow patter
- Billy Kay
- Languages of the United Kingdom
- Phonological history of Scots
- Scotticism
- Scottish Corpus of Texts and Speech
- Scottish literature
- Scots Wikipedia
