= Scottish National Dictionary Association =

The Scottish National Dictionary Association (SNDA) was founded in 1929 to foster and encourage the use of the Scots language, in particular by producing a scholarly dictionary of modern Scots. This primary aim was fulfilled in 1976 with the completion of the 10-volume Scottish National Dictionary (SND), covering the language from 1700 to 1976. Material for SND is drawn from a wide variety of written and oral sources of Lowland Scots from Shetland to Ulster. SND was produced under the editorial direction of William Grant (from 1929 to 1946), and of David Murison (from 1946 to 1976).

After the Scottish National Dictionary was completed, with its Supplement, in 1976, the Association went on to produce the Concise Scots Dictionary (1985) under the leadership of Mairi Robinson. In 1986 Iseabail Macleod became editorial director, and the SNDA began to produce a range of smaller Scots dictionaries, including the Pocket Scots Dictionary (1988) and Scots Thesaurus (1990). The Association also established an ongoing Word Collection in order to create a constantly updated resource on modern Scots. In the 1990s, the SNDA responded to an increasing focus on Scots in the classroom by producing reference materials for schools, including the Scots School Dictionary (1996) and Grammar Broonie (1999), a guide to Scots grammar with the text written in Scots by SNDA editor, Susan Rennie. In the same period, the Association turned its attention towards electronic resources, publishing both CannieSpell, the first Scots spellchecker, and the Electronic Scots School Dictionary on CD-ROM in 1998. In 2001, the SNDA was a partner with the University of Dundee in a major digitisation project to create the online Dictionary of the Scots Language (DSL), under the direction of Drs Skretkowicz and Rennie. The DSL project digitised the complete first edition texts of both the Scottish National Dictionary and the Dictionary of the Older Scottish Tongue to create a free online resource, which was published in 2004.

In 2002, when the related Dictionary of the Older Scottish Tongue Project reached completion, a new organisation, Scottish Language Dictionaries (SLD) was formed to further Scottish lexicography. Building on the work of The Scottish National Dictionary Association and the Dictionary of the Older Scottish Tongue, in 2021, Scottish Language Dictionaries became an SCIO (Scottish Charitable Incorporated Organisation) and changed its name to Dictionaries of the Scots Language (DSL). It is a registered charity in Scotland with the OSCR number SC032910. DSL also undertakes a wide programme of educational work throughout Scotland, with people of all ages and abilities.

== See also ==
- Dictionary of the Scots Language
- Scottish Language Dictionaries
- Scottish National Dictionary
- Dictionary of the Older Scottish Tongue
