= Marc Alexander (academic) =

British linguist and academic (born 1983)

- Born: 1983 (age 42–43)
- Awards: Queen’s Anniversary Prize (2017) Philip Leverhulme Prize (2019)

Academic background
- Education: MA, MPhil, PhD

Academic work
- Discipline: Linguist
- Sub-discipline: Lexicographer, Corpus Linguistics, Semantics
- Institutions: University of Glasgow
- Notable works: Historical Thesaurus of English, Hansard Corpus

Marc Alexander (born 1983) is Professor of English Linguistics at the University of Glasgow, and Director of the Historical Thesaurus of English. His research is on the semantic development of English, particularly focusing on the relationships between language, culture, and history. As the Chief Editor of the Thesaurus, he was a recipient—as part of the University of Glasgow—of the Queen’s Anniversary Prize for Higher Education in 2017. He was awarded a Philip Leverhulme Prize of £100,000 for his linguistic research in 2019.

He also created the Hansard Corpus, a linguistically-annotated version of the records of British Parliamentary speech from 1803 to the present. He is also Convener of the Board of Directors of Scottish Language Dictionaries, which produces the Dictionary of the Scots Language.

== See also ==
- Historical Thesaurus of English
- Dictionary of the Scots Language
