= Miriam Karlin =

English actress (1925–2011)

Miriam Karlin OBE
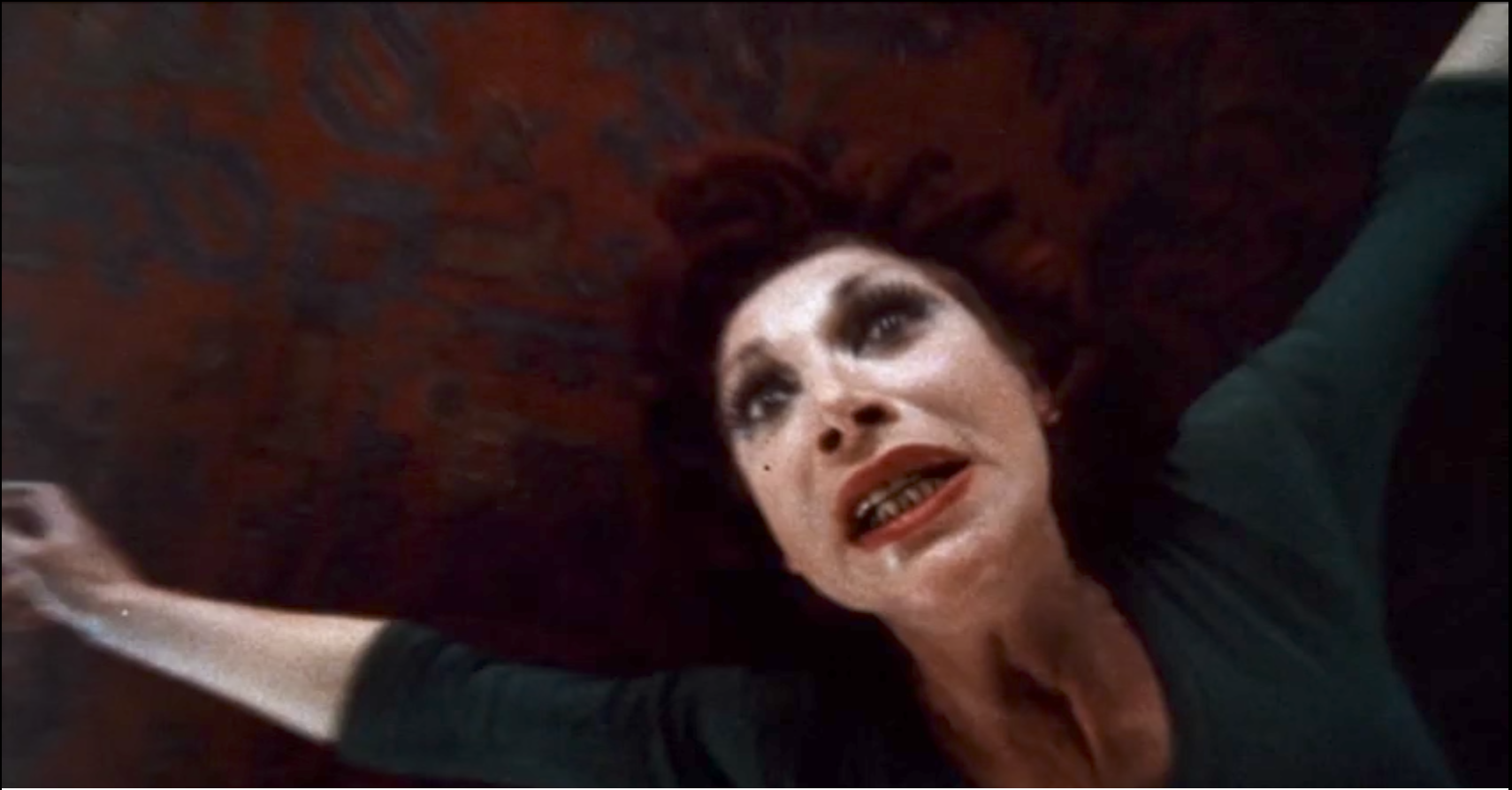
- Karlin in A Clockwork Orange (1971)
- Born: Miriam Samuels; 23 June 1925; Hampstead, London, England
- Died: 3 June 2011 (aged 85); London, England
- Education: Royal Academy of Dramatic Art
- Occupation: Actress
- Years active: 1946–2009
- Organisations: Royal Shakespeare Company; Anti-Nazi League; British Humanist Association; Equity
- Father: Harry Samuels
- Family: Michael Samuels (brother)

Miriam Karlin OBE (23 June 1925 – 3 June 2011) was an English actress whose career lasted for more than 60 years. She was known for her role as Paddy in The Rag Trade, a 1960s BBC and 1970s LWT sitcom, and in particular for the character's catchphrase "Everybody out!" Her trademark throughout her career was her deep, rough, and husky voice.

== Early life ==
Born Miriam Samuels in Hampstead, North London, she was brought up in an Orthodox Jewish family; members of her extended family were among those who were later murdered at Auschwitz. She was the daughter of Céline (née Aronowitz) and Harry Samuels, a barrister, who specialised in industrial and trade union law.

Her elder brother was Michael Samuels (1920–2010), a historical linguist responsible for the Historical Thesaurus of the Oxford English Dictionary.

When performing in one of her first radio shows, Terry-Thomas's Top of the Town, Karlin based some of the zany characters that she invented and played on people who had appeared before the rent tribunal chaired by her father.

== Career ==
After training at RADA, Karlin made her stage debut for the Entertainments National Service Association (ENSA) in wartime shows, and subsequently appeared in repertory theatre and cabaret. She appeared in the West End in Women of Twilight (1951–52), The Bad Seed (1955), The Diary of Anne Frank (1956–57), The Egg (1957–58), Fings Ain’t Wot They Used T’Be (1960–61), Fiddler on the Roof (1967–69), Bus Stop (1976), Torch Song Trilogy (1985-86) and Separate Tables (1993), among others.

She made her film debut in Down Among the Z Men (1952), as well as featuring in A Touch of the Sun, Room at the Top, The Millionairess, Heavens Above!, Ladies Who Do, The Small World of Sammy Lee, The Bargee, Just like a Woman, A Clockwork Orange and Mahler (by Ken Russell). In 1954, she had the part of a Martian alien in the BBC radio series Journey into Space.

In 1960, she appeared opposite Sir Laurence Olivier in the film adaptation of John Osborne's play The Entertainer. She performed in the stage version of Fiddler on the Roof at Her Majesty's Theatre, starring the Israeli actor Topol. In 1972, she appeared in the title role in Mother Courage and her Children at the Palace Theatre, Watford, in a production notable for the force of her performance, and its faithfulness to the Brechtian Verfremdungseffekt.

In television, she became known for playing the belligerent shop steward Paddy in The Rag Trade, a BBC sitcom set in a textile factory, between 1961 and 1963. Her character would take advantage of the slightest opportunity to call a strike; her trademark was blowing a whistle and shouting "Everybody out!" The show was revived by rival channel ITV in 1977.

In 1966, she appeared as a regular team member in the Australian satirical series The Mavis Bramston Show. She also appeared in the TV film Jekyll & Hyde (1990) starring Michael Caine.

Karlin performed on stage for the Royal Shakespeare Company at Stratford-upon-Avon, the Aldwych Theatre, and the Barbican Centre. She appeared in a national tour of 84 Charing Cross Road. In 1990, she became the first woman to play the title role in Harold Pinter's The Caretaker, in a production at the Sherman Theatre, Cardiff. From 1992 to 1994, she appeared as a Jewish ghost, Yetta Feldman, in the BBC sitcom So Haunt Me, alongside Tessa Peake-Jones and George Costigan.

In 2008, at the age of 83, she appeared in Stewart Permutt's Many Roads to Paradise at the Finborough Theatre in London.

== Personal life ==
Karlin, who never married, lived in South London. A self-proclaimed atheist, she was a lifelong campaigner for Jewish and left-wing political causes, as well as an anti-fascist activist.

A member of the Anti-Nazi League, she was prominent in protests against Holocaust denier David Irving, and campaigned to expose the Nazi sympathies of the Austrian politician Jörg Haider.

She was an active member of the actors' union, Equity, and was appointed an Officer of the Order of the British Empire (OBE) in 1975 for her union and welfare work. Karlin was a Distinguished Supporter of the British Humanist Association, a patron of both the Burma Campaign UK (which campaigns for democracy and human rights in Burma) and Dignity in Dying (which campaigns for changes to laws on assisted dying) and a trustee of the Eddie Surman Trust (an HIV charity).

She admitted to a lifelong battle with anorexia and bulimia that began in 1956 and lasted more than 48 years. She often claimed that her peripheral neuropathy was a side effect of a chronic eating disorder and years of laxative and appetite suppressant abuse.

=== Cancer diagnosis and death ===
In late 2005, while filming an Agatha Christie TV mystery, By the Pricking of My Thumbs, Karlin was told that she had cancer and that part of her tongue would have to be removed. She died on 3 June 2011, aged 85.

== Filmography ==
Year	Title	Role	Notes
1952	Down Among the Z Men	Woman in Shop	
1955	The Deep Blue Sea	Barmaid	
1955	The Woman for Joe	Gladys	
1956	Fun at St. Fanny's	'The Private Eye'	
1956	A Touch of the Sun	Alice Cann	
1956	The Big Money	Lady in Nightclub	Uncredited
1957	The Flesh Is Weak	Betty	Uncredited
1958	Carve Her Name with Pride	Jennie Wilson, Bus Conductress	Uncredited
1959	Room at the Top	Gertrude	Uncredited
1960	The Entertainer	Soubrette	
1960	The Millionairess	Mrs. Maria Joe	
1960	Crossroads to Crime	Connie Williams	
1961	Hand in Hand	Mrs. Mathias	
1961	Watch It, Sailor!	Mrs. Lack	
1961	On the Fiddle	Waaf Sergeant	
1961	The Fourth Square	Josette	Edgar Wallace Mysteries
1962	The Phantom of the Opera	Charwoman	
1962	I Thank a Fool	Woman in the Black Maria	
1963	The Small World of Sammy Lee	Milly	
1963	Heavens Above!	Winnie Smith	
1963	Ladies Who Do	Mrs. Higgins	
1964	The Bargee	Nellie Marsh	
1965	The Mavis Bramston Show	Various characters	Australian satirical sketch show
1967	Just like a Woman	Ellen Newman	
1971	A Clockwork Orange	Catlady	
1974	Mahler	Aunt Rosa	
1975	Dick Deadeye, or Duty Done	Little Buttercup / Utopian Maiden	Voice
1992	Utz	Grandmother	
1992-1994	So Haunt Me	Yetta Feldman	
1997	Incognito	Marina	
2000	The Man Who Cried	Madame Goldstein	
2004	Suzie Gold	Sadie	
2005	Dalziel and Pascoe	Judith Bateman	Episode: "Heads You Lose"
2006	Children of Men	Caged German Grandmother	
2008	Flashbacks of a Fool	Mrs. Rogers	(final film role)

== Works ==
- Karlin, Miriam (2007). Jan Sargent (ed.). Some Sort of a Life. London: Oberon Books. ISBN 978-1-84002-780-8. (Autobiography)
