= Christian Kay =

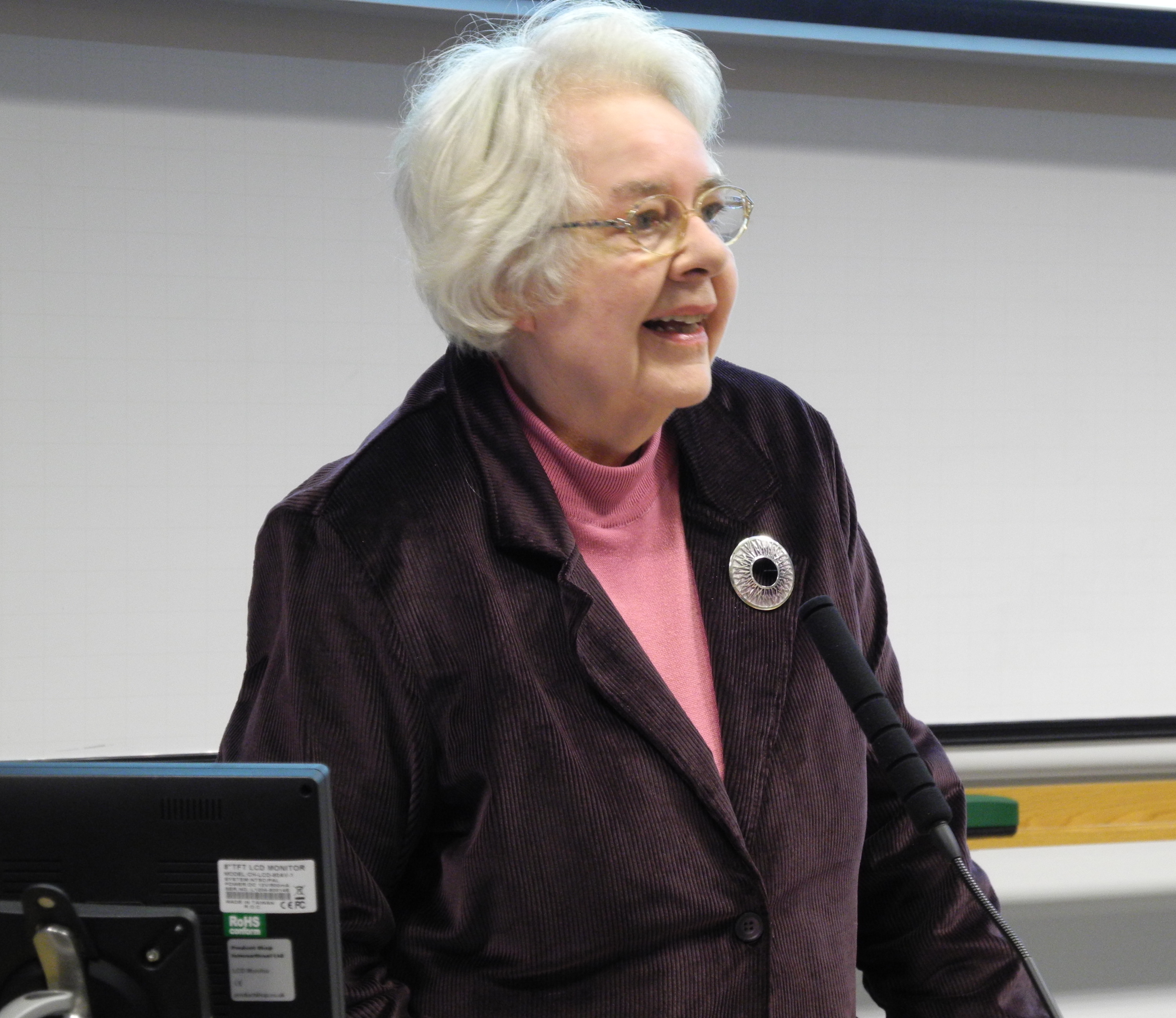
- Professor Christian Kay in 2013
- Born: 4 April 1940
- Died: 28 May 2016 (aged 76); Glasgow
- Education: MA, AM, DipGenLing, DLitt
- Alma mater: University of Edinburgh, Mount Holyoke College, University of Glasgow
- Occupations: Academic and lexicographer
- Years active: 1964-2016
- Employer: University of Glasgow
- Notable work: Historical Thesaurus of English, Scottish Corpus of Texts and Speech, Scottish Language Dictionaries

Christian Janet Kay (4 April 1940 – 28 May 2016) was Emeritus Professor of English Language and Honorary Professorial Research Fellow in English Language and Linguistics at the University of Glasgow. She was an editor, with her mentor Michael Samuels, of the world's largest and first historical thesaurus, the Historical Thesaurus of English, first published in 2009 as the Historical Thesaurus of the Oxford English Dictionary (HTOED), a project to which she dedicated 40 years (1969 to 2009).

Kay also founded the Scottish Corpus of Texts and Speech and published work on historical semantics and lexicography, and contributed metaphor and semantic annotation based projects on the Historical Thesaurus of English dataset.

== Biography ==
=== Early life ===
Kay was educated at The Mary Erskine School in Edinburgh. She completed a MA in English Language and Literature at the University of Edinburgh, before continuing on to Mount Holyoke College, Massachusetts, USA.

After this Kay took on English language teaching in Sweden, as well as professional lexicography.

=== Professional career ===
Kay first arrived at the University of Glasgow as a research assistant. At the age of 27, she became one of four co-editors and in 1979 she became a full-time lecturer in the English Language Department.

Of her career, Professor Kay is quoted as having said,

"I never intended to be an academic. I worked in journalism, English-language teaching and publishing before becoming a research assistant and then a lecturer at Glasgow. The common thread is an interest in language."

Recognised as an academic leader, and a scholar, over the course of her career, Kay had under her employ in 233 researchers and production staff.

In 1995 Kay and Jane Roberts published A Thesaurus of Old English, and in 1996 Kay was promoted from Senior Lecturer to Professor.

Kay was the original convenor of the board of Scottish Language Dictionaries (SLD), which was formed in 2002.

Retiring in 2005, Kay remained active in the facilitation and research in Thesaurus-derived projects. She continued to actively support the completion of the Historical Thesaurus of the Oxford English Dictionary which was published on 22 October 2009.

Kay is credited to have created the first computer laboratory for English studies in the world, developing cutting-edge teaching software, and first of its kind research-led courses in literary and linguistic computing.

In 2013, the University of Glasgow awarded her Professor Kay an honorary D.Litt. for her outstanding contribution service to the study of the English language.

=== Work on the Historical Thesaurus of English ===
In 1989, when Professor Samuels retired, Kay became Director of the Historical Thesaurus project.

The result of 44 years of work, the HTOED received critical acclaim and was awarded the Saltire Society Research Book of the Year Award in 2009. In review by The New York Times, the commentator noted,

"historians, sociologists, philosophers and literary critics will soon wonder how they got by for so long without it... indispensable."

Randolph Quirk, Emeritus Quain Professor of English Language and Literature at University College, London reported,

"Forty five years of exacting scholarship by a well-led team have had a triumphal outcome. This book is a magnificent achievement of quite extraordinary value. It is perhaps the single most significant tool ever devised for investigating semantic, social, and intellectual history."

An overwhelming success, the HTOED has generated significant royalties allowing for a legacy of funding for postgraduate studentships continuing research into the linguistics of English and of Scots.

=== Death ===
Kay died in 2016 at the age of 76. She is survived by her sister and brother. She requested no funeral.

The Christian Kay Prize for Outstanding Achievement in Undergraduate Research into Modern English Language and Linguistics was set up in her memory at the University of Glasgow.

== Publications ==
- Roberts, Jane and Christian Kay with Lynne Grundy. 1995. A Thesaurus of Old English. (=King's College London Medieval Studies XI.) Second edition, 2000. Amsterdam: Rodopi. ISBN 9789042015630
- Kay, Christian. 2000. `Historical semantics and historical lexicography: will the twain ever meet?', in Lexicology, Semantics and Lexicography in English Historical Linguistics: Selected Papers from the Fourth G.L. Brook Symposium, ed. by Julie Coleman and Christian Kay. Amsterdam: Benjamins, 53-68. ISBN 9781556199721
- Kay, Christian J. and Irené A. W. Wotherspoon. 2002. `Turning the dictionary inside out: some issues in the compilation of a historical thesaurus', in A Changing World of Words: Studies in English historical semantics and lexis, ed. by Javier E. Diaz Vera. Amsterdam: Rodopi, 109-135. ISBN 9789042013308
- O'Hare, Cerwyss. 2004. `Folk Classification in the HTE Plants Category', in Kay and Smith, eds, 179-191. in Categorization in the History of English, ed. by Christian Kay and Jeremy Smith. Amsterdam: Benjamins, 59-69. ISBN 9781588116192
- Kay, Christian, Jane Roberts, Michael Samuels, Irené Wotherspoon, and Marc Alexander (eds.). 2017. The Historical Thesaurus of English, version 4.22. Glasgow: University of Glasgow. http://www.glasgow.ac.uk/thesaurus/.
