= Older Scots =

Older Scots is a distinct historical stage in the development of the Scots language, encompassing its evolution between the 14th and 18th centuries. It is a subfield of study within the wider historical linguistics of Scots. This chronological term is widely used, for example by Scottish Language Dictionaries (formally SNDA), the Oxford Companion to the English Language, and the Cambridge History of English and American Literature. The online Dictionary of the Scots Language includes the Dictionary of the Older Scottish Tongue.

Older Scots is used for the following periods in the history of the Scots language:

- Pre-literary Scots to 1375
- Early Scots to 1450
- Middle Scots to 1700
