= Mairi Robinson =

Scottish lexicographer (1945–2020)

- crop from The Scotsman
- Born: Helen Mairi Johnstone Mcnicol; 21 January 1945; Dennistoun, Glasgow
- Died: 17 June 2020; Edinburgh
- Citizenship: British
- Education: Liberton Primary School, George Watson's Ladies' College
- Alma mater: University of Edinburgh
- Occupation: Lexicographer
- Spouse: David Robinson
- Children: John, Nicola
- Relatives: Alan Charlton (1970–2018)
- Writing career
- Subject: Scots
- Notable works: Concise Scots Dictionary, Chambers' Twenty-first Century Dictionary

Mairi Robinson (née Macnicol) (21 January 1945 to 17 June 2020) was best known for her dedication towards the study of the Scottish language and Scottish lexicography. She worked on the later stages of the Scottish National Dictionary and became the editor-in-chief where she oversaw the 1985 publication for the Concise Scots dictionary. She was Scots language consultant for the complete edition of Sir Walter Scott's novels. She was committed to adult learning. Her work has been a noteworthy contribution to the Scots language and to the confidence of the Scottish people about their language.

== Life ==
She was born in Dennistoun, Glasgow, in 1945, daughter of the Rev. John Mcnicol and Elma Kennedy. When she was three she embarked on a long journey to Australia, as her father had a job as a lecturer at Ormond College of the University of Melbourne. As a result of her father's death, she returned to Edinburgh with her mother in 1952., where she attended Liberton Primary School, and then the George Watson's Ladies' College. She was a brilliant pupil and very academically inclined, well ahead of her peers, so that she became Dux at 16. In the 1960s she joined the University of Edinburgh where she studied Classics, and where she met her future husband, David Robinson, professor of Greek philosophy. They were both on a university trip to Pompei and they married five years later. She became involved soon in lexicography, joining the editing team of the Scottish National Dictionary. Soon after, she was to lead her own team in the creation of a much wanted abridged version, the Concise Scots Dictionary, to be published in 1985. Subsequently, she was the language consultant for the significant complete edition of Sir Walter Scott's Waverley novels, in 30 volumes, published by the Edinburgh University Press. It goes back to this time the gratifying photograph of her in front of the windows of the James Thin bookshop, a well known landmark of the Old city of Edinburgh, displaying all her recently published works.

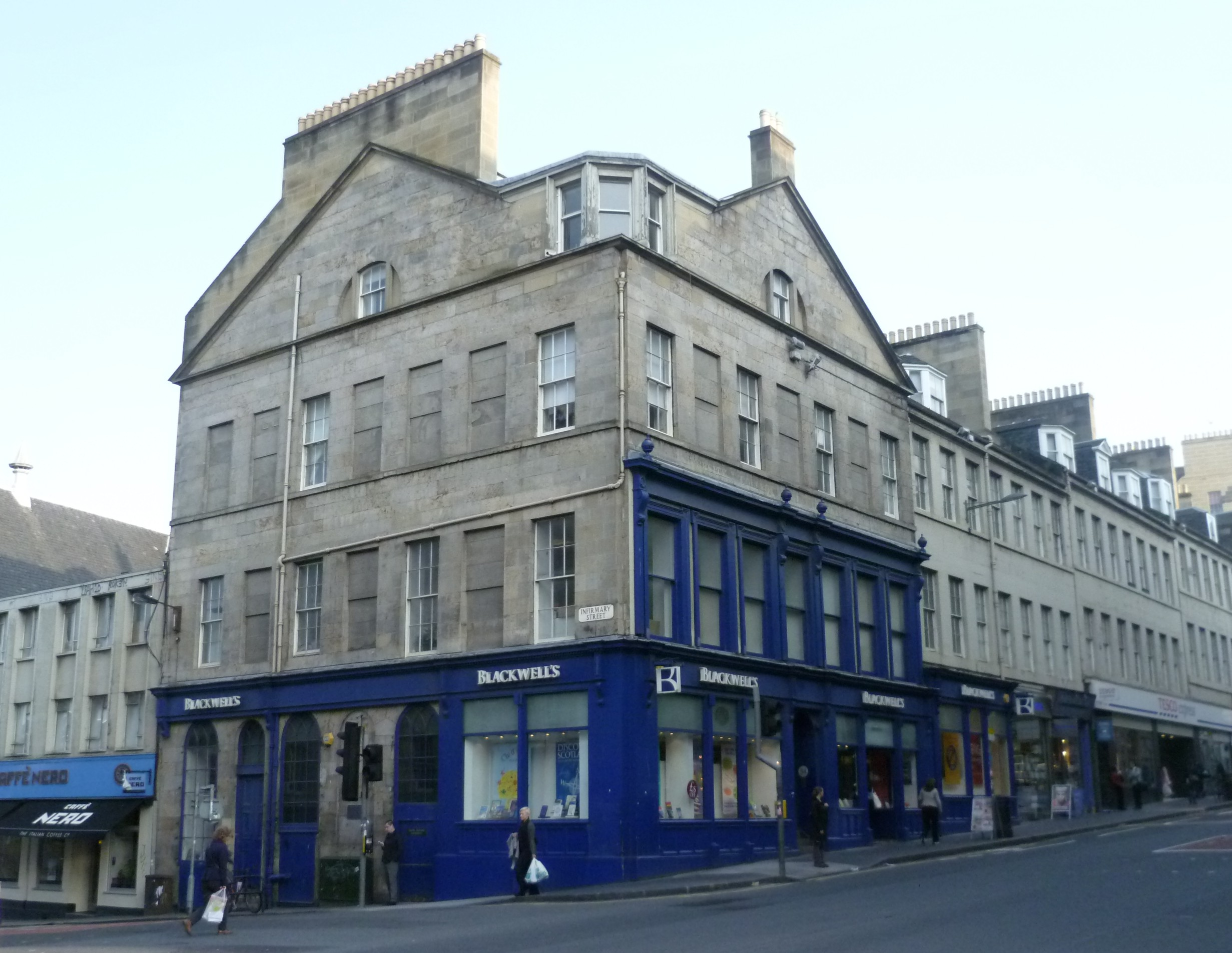
Former James Thin bookshop, South Bridge Edinburgh

This project, together with her commitment to the diffusion of the Scots language, made her a well-known public figure in the community that also put her under the spotlight, appearing on television on Russel Harty's chat show. Having experienced first-hand the transition from card catalogs to new technology, she became involved in Computer science, and helped to develop a computer database of language, the British National Corpus. When completed her projects as a lexicographer, she did not hesitate to pursue further with enthusiasm another interest of her, the adult education in communities, with special attention to deprived areas and disadvantaged learners. She went back to college to train in Adult Education and obtaining a certificate in Community Education. Her wide involvement in the community includes posts in Stirling, Craigmillar, Home-Start-Leith, North-east Edinburgh, and she was manager of the Ace Cornton education centre. Her interests, ranging in a wide variety of subjects, included Scottish History, Architecture, Archaeology, Geography and Music. She was a member of the Scottish Society for Northern Studies, the Scottish Local History Forum, the Damned Rebel Bitches Scottish Women's History Group, and she was secretary of the Conference of Scottish Medievalists. With her brisk and attentive ear she was bound to be interested in Music, and this was plentiful in her life as she sang as an alto voice in the Sine Nomine Choir, Edinburgh University Opera Club, and the Edinburgh Festival Chorus, as well as being a regular concert attender. She happened to share her birthday date with the famous opera singer Plácido Domingo, whom she had listened to performing Carmen at the Edinburgh Festival in 1977. When her daughter Nicola met him, he presented her his signature with the inscription "Happy Birthday to us". She also had one son, John, and her daughter Nicola married the composer Alan Charlton. She separated from her husband in 1984. She was a spirited character, always with a ready smile. Mairi was diagnosed with advanced pancreatic cancer in May 2020, and was looked after at home until her peaceful death.

== The Scots dictionary ==
In 1966 she was already working as an editor and senior editor in the team led by David Murison of the Scottish National Dictionary, whose editor was A.J. Aitken. From 1973 to 1985, she was editor-in-chief of the Concise Scots Dictionary. While the Scottish National Dictionary was one valuable source, covering in ten volumes the Scots language from 1700 onward, the need for a concise edition had already been expressed by Denton Fox, some twenty years prior to the publication of the Concise Scots Dictionary. The latter also drew from the equally majestic Dictionary of the Older Scottish Tongue, covering the language from the 12th century to 1700, that at the time was still incomplete in its publication. The endeavor of covering such a wide time period in a concise publication would have been a daunting one to anyone, with the need to account for sound changes over time, regional dialects and countless variations of spelling. Mairi Robinson's team addressed all these needs compiling a much useful introduction and notes, making easy to cross-reference words to their sources, providing etymology, chronology and their geographical range. The aim was to be all-inclusive, and accessible to every reader who require agile access to the Scot language. The difficulty to achieve conciseness was overcome by including only words for which three quotations could be found. The pronunciation was given according to the extensive phonetic system developed by A.J. Aitken, accompanied by a resourceful table that allowed to recreate the sound of a word in Early, Middle and Modern Scots, all in one handy volume. The dictionary was published again in a new edition in 1997, within the Chamber series, with the name of Chamber 21st century dictionary. Comments and reviews of both editions in the press included "inside, all is well. The clarity of thought and usage associated with Scotland shines from every page, the typography and layout is as clear and as elegant as the definitions", and "The importance of this single volume with its wealth of etymological, regional and grammatical information should never be underestimated and the Scots community would be much poorer without it". Denton Fox said that he never expected that his wishes for an abridged version of a Scots dictionary would be met so sumptuously. Adam Fergusson described it as a splendid volume and, of course, far more wieldy than the majestic Scottish National Dictionary on which it draws in full.
