= Iseabail Macleod =

Scottish lexicographer (1936–2018)

Iseabail Macleod MBE
- Born: 27 May 1936; Dalmuir
- Died: 15 February 2018 (aged 81); Edinburgh
- Occupations: Lexicographer, editor

Iseabail C. Macleod MBE (27 May 1936 – 15 February 2018) was a Scottish lexicographer.

== Early life ==
Iseabail C. Macleod was born in Dalmuir, in West Dunbartonshire. Her parents were native Gaelic speakers. Her father was a policeman. In childhood, she was evacuated with her mother and younger brother Iain to Achiltibuie in the Scottish Highlands, for safety during World War II. She completed a master's degree in languages at the University of Glasgow in 1957.

== Career ==
Iseabail Macleod taught languages in schools in Austria and Scotland as a young woman, but soon moved into editorial work. She began working on dictionaries during a job at reference publisher William Collins and Sons in Glasgow, and moved to Edinburgh in 1975, as editor at another reference publisher, W & R Chambers, and then became a freelance editor.

She was Editorial Director of the Scottish National Dictionary Association from 1986 to 2002. In that role, she oversaw the technological transitions that brought the Scots School Dictionary onto CD-ROM, for classroom use. "There are many things which you can say in Scots which are much more difficult to express in English," she explained of the dictionary's value for young learners.

In the 2001 New Year Honours, she was named a member of the Order of the British Empire for her work on Scots dictionaries. She was also an Honorary Fellow of the Association for Scottish Literary Studies.

== Personal life ==
Macleod was an active skier, walker and hiker until her last years. She died 15 February 2018, in Edinburgh, aged 81 years, after a stroke.

== Publications ==
- Concise English-Scots Dictionary (1985)
- Pocket Guide to Scottish Words (1986)
- The Scots Thesaurus (1990)
- The Pocket Guide to Scottish Words (1991)
- The Wordsworth Dictionary of First Names (1995)
- Scotland : a linguistic double helix (1995)
- Edinburgh Pocket Guide (1996)
- The Illustrated Encyclopedia of Scotland (2004)
- The Pocket Scots Dictionary
- The Pocket Guide to Scottish Place-names (2010)
- Scotland in Definition: A History of Scottish Dictionaries (2012)
- Scots: Studies in its Literature and Language (2013)
- Scoor-oot: A Dictionary of Scots Words and Phrases in Current Use (2015)
