= Laud Herbal Glossary =

12th-century work

The Laud Herbal Glossary (MS Oxford, Bodleian Library, Laud Misc. 587) is a twelfth-century copy of the single biggest compilation of plant-name glosses of its time in England, rooted in Anglo-Saxon sources. Its lemmata are mostly Latin, and these are mostly glossed into Old English/Middle English.

== Sources for the glossary ==
Although the Laud Herbal Glossary drew on many sources, its main sources for vernacular glosses are a list of plant-names in the Greek primer, the Hermeneumata Pseudo-Dositheana (the best preserved manuscript of which appears to be Brussels, Bibliothèque Royale, 1828–30, folios 94–95, which gives the names under the title 'Nomina herbarum Grece et Latine'); the Old English Herbarium; and a text very like the Durham Plant-Name Glossary.
