= Scottish National Dictionary =

The Scottish National Dictionary (SND) was published by the Scottish National Dictionary Association (SNDA) from 1931 to 1976 and documents the Modern (Lowland) Scots language. The original editor, William Grant (1863–1946), was the driving force behind the collection of Scots vocabulary. A wide range of sources were used by the editorial team in order to represent the full spectrum of Scottish vocabulary and cultural life. Their work built on the earlier materials collected by the Scottish Dialects Committee (SDC), which had been formed in 1907 with Grant as its Convener. The SDC published a series of Transactions from 1911 to 1921, which included early versions of some dictionary entries.

== History ==
Literary sources of words and phrases up to the mid-twentieth century were thoroughly investigated, as were historical records, both published and unpublished, of Parliament, Town Councils, Kirk Sessions and Presbyteries and Law Courts. More ephemeral sources such as domestic memoirs, household account books, diaries, letters and the like were also read for the dictionary, as well as a wide range of local and national newspapers and magazines, which often shed light on regional vocabulary and culture.

Perhaps because Scots has often been perceived as inappropriate for formal situations (including formal written text) during the period from 1700 to the present day, many words and expressions that were in regular everyday use did not appear in print. In order to redress this imbalance and fully appreciate the linguistic oral heritage of Scots, field-workers for the dictionary collected personal quotations across the country.

Volume I, part II was published in 1932. David Murison became editor of the dictionary in 1946, after William Grant's death. He greatly increased the number and range of written sources and expanded the coverage of oral material. He improved the layout and clarity of the entries, revealing the healthy position of modern Scots usage in spite of centuries of neglect. Murison was therefore instrumental in encouraging the study of modern Scots and fostering respect for it as a language. He was responsible for the completion of Volume III, and for overall control of Volumes IV to X.

In 1985, the one-volume Concise Scots Dictionary based on the SND and DOST was published (editor-in-chief Mairi Robinson).

From 2001 to 2004, a team at Dundee University, led by Dr Victor Skretkowicz and lexicographer, Susan Rennie, digitised the full text of all ten volumes and made them freely available as part of the online Dictionary of the Scots Language.

An award from the Heritage Lottery Fund brought the SND up-to-date with a New Supplement, published online in 2005 as part of the Dictionary of the Scots Language.

== See also ==
- Dictionary of the Scots Language
- Scottish Language Dictionaries
- Scottish National Dictionary Association
- Dictionary of the Older Scottish Tongue
