= Harry Samuels =

Harry Samuels, OBE (1893 – 1976) was a British barrister and political activist.

Born in Liverpool, Samuels was educated at the University of Oxford. While there, he joined the Fabian Society, and became increasingly active in the organisation, serving on its executive committee, as its local government adviser, and writing numerous books and tracts for the society.

In 1923, Samuels became a barrister, and was soon reviewing legal cases for the Journal of Industrial Welfare. He joined the Industrial Welfare Society, and by 1930, he was lecturing for the organisations. He became its legal counsel, serving until 1970. He also had an interest in tenants' rights, and for 25 years he chaired the Islington and East London Rent Tribunal. He was a member of the Anglo-Jewish Association, B'nai B'rith, and the Board of Deputies.

Samuels stood unsuccessfully for the Labour Party in Sheffield Ecclesall at the 1929 United Kingdom general election, in Fulham East at the 1931 London County Council election, and then in Paddington North at the 1934 London County Council election.

In 1958, Samuels was made an Officer of the Order of the British Empire.

Samuels' children included Michael, who became a historical linguist, and Miriam, an actor.
