= Durham Plant-Name Glossary =

12th-century glossary of plant names

The Durham Plant-Name Glossary (MS Durham, Cathedral Library, Hunter 100) is a glossary translating Latin and Greek plant-names into Old English/Middle English. It was copied in Durham in the early twelfth century.

== Sources of the glossary ==
The principal sources of the Durham Plant-Name Glossary were a Greek-Latin-Old English plant-name glossary whose lemmata come from Dioscorides’s De materia medica (which also contributed lemmata and glosses to the Épinal-Erfurt glossaries) and those entries in the Old English Herbarium which translate Latin plant-names with vernacular plant-names. A text very like the Durham Plant-Name Glossary was one major source of the more extensive Laud Herbal Glossary.
