= Michael Samuels (linguist) =

British historical linguist

Michael Louis Samuels (14 September 1920 – 24 November 2010) was a British Ashkenazi historical linguist, responsible for the Historical Thesaurus of English.

== Life ==
Samuels was born 14 September 1920 in London, the son of Harry Samuels, and Céline Aronowitz: his sister was actress Miriam Karlin (1925–2011). His was an orthodox Jewish upbringing, but he later said he was an atheist.

He studied at St Paul's school, and Balliol College, Oxford, initially to study classics, but graduating with first-class honours in English in 1947, after wartime service with the Air Ministry. In 1950 he married Hilary, and they had a daughter Vivien.

His academic career began with a research fellowship at the University of Birmingham followed by a lectureship at Edinburgh University. He became Professor of English Language at Glasgow University in 1959, staying until his retirement in 1990.

After this academic retirement he continued to work, especially on the Historical Thesaurus of English, a project he had begun in 1965. In 1979 Professor Christian Kay joined the project, working with Samuels until his retirement in 1989 and continuing to work on it until publication of its first edition. ^{[3][4][5][6][7]}

The finished work was eventually published in October 2009. He died 24 November 2010 and was survived by his wife, daughter and sister.

== Works ==
- Samuels, M. L., (1972) Linguistic Evolution: with special reference to English Cambridge University Press, ISBN 978-0-521-08385-0
- McIntosh, Angus, Samuels, M.L. and Benskin, Michael, (1986) A Linguistic Atlas of Late Medieval English Aberdeen: University Press
