= Historical Thesaurus of English =

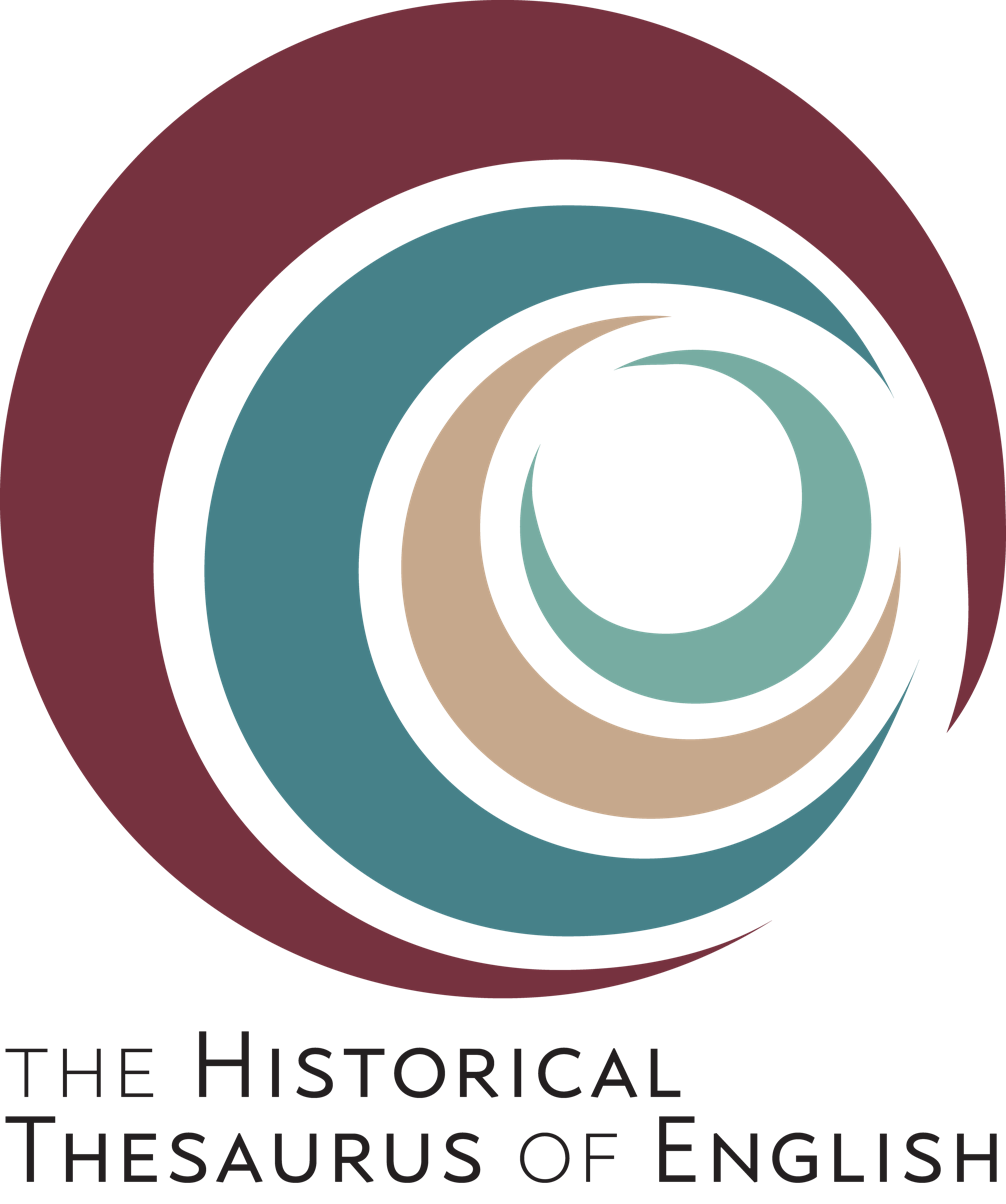
- Website type: Academic
- Owner: University of Glasgow
- Editors: Christian Kay, Marc Alexander, Fraser Dallachy, Jane Roberts, Michael Samuels, and Irené Wotherspoon (editors)
- Website: www.ht.ac.uk
- Commercial: No
- Registration: None
- Current status: Version 4.21, since December 2016
- Content licence: Free for personal and non-commercial research

The Historical Thesaurus of English (HTE) is the largest thesaurus in the world. It is called a historical thesaurus as it arranges the whole vocabulary of English, from the earliest written records in Old English to the present, according to the first documented occurrence of a word in the entire history of the English language. The HTE was conceived and begun in 1965 by the English Language & Linguistics department of the University of Glasgow, who have ever since continued to compile the thesaurus. From the 1980s onwards the project was moved from paper-based records to a computer database.

Today, the HTE is available to the public online, but a print version, the Historical Thesaurus of the Oxford English Dictionary (HTOED), was published in 2009.

== Main project: The Historical Thesaurus of English (HTE) ==
The Historical Thesaurus of English (HTE) is a complete database of all the words in the Oxford English Dictionary and other dictionaries (including Old English), arranged by semantic field and date. In this way, the HTE arranges the whole vocabulary of English, from the earliest written records in Old English to the present, alongside dates of use.

It is the first historical thesaurus to be compiled for any of the world's languages and contains 800,000 meanings for 600,000 words, within 230,000 categories. As the HTE website states, "in addition to providing hitherto unavailable information for linguistic and textual scholars, the Historical Thesaurus online is a rich resource for students of social and cultural history, showing how concepts developed through the words that refer to them."

=== Structure ===
The work is divided into three main sections: the External World, the Mind, and Society. These are broken down into successively narrower domains. The text eventually discriminates more than 236,000 categories. The second order categories are:

I. The External World

1. The earth
2. Life
3. Health and disease
4. People
5. Animals
6. Plants
7. Food and drink
8. Textiles and clothing
9. Physical sensation
10. Matter
11. Existence and causation
12. Space
13. Time
14. Movement
15. Action/operation
16. Relative properties
17. The supernatural

II. The Mind

1. Mental capacity
2. Attention and judgment
3. Goodness and badness
4. Emotion
5. Will
6. Possession
7. Language

III. Society

1. Society and the community
2. Inhabiting and dwelling
3. Armed hostility
4. Authority
5. Law
6. Morality
7. Education
8. Faith
9. Communication
10. Travel and travelling
11. Occupation and work
12. Trade and finance
13. Leisure

=== History ===
The ambitious project was announced at a 1965 meeting of the Philological Society by its originator, Michael Samuels. Work on the HTE started in the same year.

In 2017, the University of Glasgow was awarded the Queen's Anniversary Prize for Higher Education for the HTE.

A second edition of the online HTE is currently in progress and is expected to be launched in late 2020. Work is released on the freely-available HTE website when available.

== Print edition: Historical Thesaurus of the Oxford English Dictionary (HTOED) ==
Historical Thesaurus of the Oxford English Dictionary: With additional material from A Thesaurus of Old English
- Print edition of version 1.0 of the Historical Thesaurus of English
- Author: Christian Kay, Jane Roberts, Michael Samuels, and Irené Wotherspoon (editors)
- Working title: Historical Thesaurus of English
- Language: English
- Subject: History of the English language
- Genre: Thesauri
- Published: 2009 (Oxford University Press)
- Publication place: Great Britain
- Pages: 4,448
- Awards: Scottish Research Book of the Year Award, Saltire Society Literary Awards, 2009
- ISBN: 978-0199208999
- OCLC: 318409912
- LC Class: PE1591 .H55 2009

On 22 October 2009, after 44 years of work, version 1.0 of the HTE was published by Oxford University Press in a two-volume slipcased set as the Historical Thesaurus of the Oxford English Dictionary (HTOED). The two hardcover volumes together total nearly 4,500 pages.
