= Dictionaries of the Scots Language =

Online Scots-English dictionary

The Dictionaries of the Scots Language (DSL) (Scots: Dictionars o the Scots Leid, Scottish Gaelic: Faclairean na h-Albais) is an online Scots–English dictionary platform managed by the Scottish lexicographic body now called Dictionaries of the Scots Language SCIO. Freely available via the Internet, the DSL resource makes available the two major historical dictionaries of the Scots language:

- Scottish National Dictionary (SND), originally published in 10 volumes between 1931 and 1976.
- Dictionary of the Older Scottish Tongue (DOST), originally published in 12 volumes between 1931 and 2002.

DOST contains information about Older Scots words in use from the 12th century to 1700 (Early and Middle Scots). The SND contains information about Scots words in use from 1700 to the 1970s (Modern Scots). DSL brings together the contents of these 22 volumes to provide comprehensive coverage of vocabulary throughout the history of Scots. The DSL website can be used to access both dictionaries, which together contain more than 78,500 entries and 750,000 illustrative citations.

SND's Bibliography and DOST's Register of Titles have also been digitised and can be searched in the same way as the dictionaries' A-Z content. A new SND supplement was added to DSL in 2005, covering material up to that date.

== History ==
The original project to digitise all 22 volumes of the SND and DOST to create the first online Dictionary of the Scots Language (DSL1) ran from February 2001 to January 2004. It was based at the University of Dundee and was primarily funded by a grant from the Arts and Humanities Research Board, with additional support provided by the Scottish National Dictionary Association and the Russell Trust. The DSL1 team was led by academic, Dr Victor Skretkowicz and lexicographer, Susan Rennie, a former Senior Editor with the Scottish National Dictionary Association. The methodology of DSL1 was based on a previous, pilot project by Rennie to digitise the Scottish National Dictionary, in which page scans of the print SND were converted to machine-readable text using Optical Character Recognition (OCR) technology. Mark-up was then added using a customised XML format based on Text Encoding Initiative guidelines. As well as the editorial team in Dundee, the project was assisted by the Centre for Data Digitisation and Analysis at Queen’s University, Belfast, and the Language Technology Group at the University of Edinburgh. The Dundee-born poet, Jim Stewart, also worked for a time as a proofreader on the DSL1 project.

After the launch of DSL1 in 2004, the original editorial team in Dundee was disbanded, although Scottish Language Dictionaries (SLD) continued to work separately on a second supplement for SND. This was published online in 2005, adding 290 new entries and additional material for nearly 4,000 existing entries.

Lack of financial security meant that the editorial team was unable to undertake further development work until 2010. Work then began on strengthening the foundation of the dictionaries' XML and improving the user interface. SLD also partnered with the University of Glasgow, who currently host the DSL, and a number of subsequent versions of DSL have been published since 2014.

The Dictionary of the Scots Language data was also used to create sample categories for a new Historical Thesaurus of Scots (HTS) project, led by Rennie at the University of Glasgow, which was launched in 2015.

Dr Victor Skretkowicz was born in Hamilton, Ontario in 1942 and in 1978 he joined the English Department in the University of Dundee. In 1989, he became the University's representative on the Joint Council for the Dictionary of the Older Scottish Tongue, being elected as its convenor three years later. Under his direction it was responsible for volumes 9–12 of that dictionary. In 2001, he was appointed Research Director of the project to create the Dictionary of the Scots Language. Skretkowicz retired from Dundee in 2007 and died in 2009. Archives relating to his work are held by the University of Dundee's Archive Services.

== Nomenclature ==
The first online version of the DSL, launched in 2004, was called the Dictionary of the Scots Language / Dictionar o the Scots Leid. It is now referred to as DSL1 to distinguish it from later versions, which use the plural Dictionaries of the Scots Language, to reflect the fact that the contents are drawn from two separate source dictionaries.

== Dictionaries of the Scots Language SCIO ==
Dictionaries of the Scots Language SCIO is the body currently responsible for A Dictionary of the Older Scottish Tongue (DOST), the Scottish National Dictionary (SND), and the online Dictionaries of the Scots Language (DSL). The organisation has a long history under a number of guises. It began as two separate bodies: the Scottish Dictionaries Joint Council (founded in 1953 out of the original DOST project team, which itself had been founded in the early 1920s) and the Scottish National Dictionary Association (founded in 1929 and responsible for the compilation of the Scottish National Dictionary). These joined forces in 2002 to become Scottish Language Dictionaries Ltd, which in turn became Dictionaries of the Scots Language SCIO in January 2021.

== Current priorities ==
Current work on DSL is guided by the strategic priorities determined by its Board of Governors in 2023, namely:

- Curation of DSL Online as Dictionaries of the Scots Language SCIO's primary purpose, with smaller derivative publications and collaborations on publicly-funded projects as minor, secondary objectives;
- Modernisation of the online platform;
- Prioritisation of SND over DOST where resources are limited.
