= Dictionary of the Older Scottish Tongue =

The Dictionary of the Older Scottish Tongue (DOST) is a 12-volume dictionary that documents the history of the Scots language covering Older Scots from the earliest written evidence in the 12th century until the year 1700. DOST was compiled over a period of some eighty years, from 1931 to 2002.

== Craigie and Aitken ==
The fundamental principles of editorial policy were established under the authority of the first editor, Sir William Craigie, who was also the third editor of the Oxford English Dictionary (1901–1928) and co-editor of the first OED Supplement (1933).

Craigie was followed by Professor A. J. Aitken, who endorsed Craigie's principles, but he was nonetheless aware that the coverage of the language provided in Volumes I and II still had some room for improvement. He more than doubled the number of source texts read for the dictionary and launched a new reading programme, with more than 50 new voluntary excerptors, reading both printed editions and, mostly on microfilm, manuscripts. Aitken also widened the scope of the editing. Under his regime sense analysis was refined and the illustration of usage came more and more to be considered an important part of an entry. As regards coverage, Aitken aimed at exhaustiveness for the pre-1600 linguistic record. At the same time however, he continued Craigie's policy of filtering out material belonging to the 17th century.

== Stevenson ==
Dr James A. C. Stevenson further refined the coverage of semantic and grammatical usage. He continued the trend towards further and more detailed analysis of the entries and sought especially to capture the intricacies of Older Scots syntax. He echoed Aitken with respect to the scope of the dictionary. Stevenson tackled a number of previously intransigent problems of the management of the dictionary materials, especially with regard to making previously used slips available for the later letters of the alphabet, a process known as sending on. Stevenson regularised this procedure and modernised and simplified some of the rules of layout of the published material.

== Dareau ==
Under the editorial direction of Margaret G. Dareau, Craigie and Aitken's approaches were developed further, and the project finally reached completion. Dareau believed that while Scots words must of necessity be compared with their English counterparts (where available), great care should be taken to ensure that due consideration was given to Scots as a separate language. Consequently, she placed greater emphasis on the functioning of the word in society. This period of editorship also saw a reduction in discrimination between the language of the 16th and 17th centuries. Entries were no longer omitted merely because they made their first appearance in Scots after 1600. Though the spelling may be anglicised, much of the usage of the 17th century is still characteristically Scots. Dareau also oversaw the final rejection of the concept of separating entries by phonemic variation, which had meant that readers needed to consult several entries to gain a full picture of the history of what was effectively the same word. Since 2004 the ability to search the DOST electronically within the Dictionary of the Scots Language has greatly helped to alleviate this difficulty when dealing with the earlier sections of the alphabet.

== Significance ==
Inevitably, the perceptions of different editors have reflected the changing views of Scotland's past and present, and attitudes to the Scots language developed considerably between the 1920s and 2002. The project also evolved into an enterprise supported and funded by six of Scotland's Universities and a good number of Charitable Foundations, and, latterly, by the Scottish Office and the Scottish Arts Council.

From 2001 to 2004, a team at the University of Dundee, led by Dr Victor Skretkowicz and lexicographer, Susan Rennie, digitized the full text of all twelve volumes and made them freely available as part of the online Dictionary of the Scots Language. The archives of their work are now held by the University's Archive Services.

== See also ==
- Dictionary of the Scots Language
- Scottish National Dictionary
- Scottish Language Dictionaries
