= T–V distinction in the world's languages =

Sociolinguistic phenomenon

The T–V distinction (from the Latin pronouns tu and vos) is a contrast in a given language between various forms of addressing one or multiple conversation partner(s). The distinction occurs in a number of the world's languages, and may be specialized for varying levels of politeness, social distance, courtesy, familiarity, age or insult toward the addressee.

== Indo-European languages ==
=== West Germanic languages ===
==== Afrikaans ====
Modern Afrikaans rarely distinguishes between the informal second-person singular jy/jou and the more formal u (capitalized if addressing God), with the former supplanting the latter in most cases. Familial titles are often used in place of formal u when speaking to a significantly older person, who can be of a different family, e.g. Sal oom my asseblief help? ("Will uncle please help me?") or Hoe gaan dit met ouma? ("How is grandma doing?").

U is sometimes still used in business, politics, polite conversation, interactions with customers, and other formal settings. The second-person plural julle is used in all social contexts.

==== English ====
Modern Standard English uses a single second-person pronoun you for all grammatical cases, numbers, and social contexts. (Note: There is a minor amount of T–V distinction among English dialects that either employ informal first-person singulars (such as South Yorkshire's sustained use of tha), or have adopted a new second-person plural (such as the American South's y'all). Speakers of these non-prestige dialects typically maintain a separate language register including you for speaking with people outside their community whose judgment they don't want to offend. For other variants, see the articles collected at Category:Second-person plural pronouns in English.)

Old English used the second-person singular þū (Note: Þū was the nominative case of the word; the accusative form was originally þeċ but came to be replaced by the dative þē.) in both formal and informal contexts, and Middle English followed this trend with þou (Note: The accusative of þou was at first spelled þe or the but later became thee.) for some time after the 1066 Norman Conquest. However, by the 13th century, the second-person plural pronoun ȝe or ye had been adopted in formal contexts.

As part of English's continued divergence from its synthetic origins following the Norman Conquest, grammatical case was largely lost in the transition from Middle to Early Modern English. Accordingly, you (objective case) had almost entirely supplanted ye (nominative case) by the 15th century. In Early Modern English, ye and you were used to address superiors and strangers, while thou and thee were reserved for familiars and subordinates. The more widespread and observed this division became, the more pejorative it became to address strangers with familiar thou and thee. By the 17th century, such usage among nobility was seen as strongly and deliberately contemptuous, as in the declamation of the prosecutor at Sir Walter Raleigh's 1603 trial "I thou thee, thou traitor!" Use of thou rapidly declined and by the 18th century was effectively extinct in most English dialects, supplanted by the formal pronoun you, even when addressing children and animals. This was also seen in Dutch, most Brazilian Portuguese dialects and Spanish spoken in parts of Costa Rica and Colombia.

Despite this, translators of the King James Bible chose to keep the older forms in their work (1604–1611) in order to convey the same grammatical distinctions as their Hebrew, Greek, and Latin sources. Its subsequent popularity and the religious rationale of many (Note: Including the Quakers' "Plain Speech" and Latter-day Saints' prayers.) who continued to employ thou has preserved its use in English, but made it seem pious and ironically more formal and respectful than the everyday you.

In the United States, some Protestant sects, such as the Quakers, insisted on addressing everyone as thou, because they considered every person to be a friend and an equal. This persisted until the 19th or early 20th century.

==== West Frisian ====
In West Frisian, the formal singular nominative jo (pronounced yo) is very close to the English you and the Middle and Early Modern English ye. There is no such distinction in the plural; the plural second-person pronoun is always jimme. Stadsfries, a Dutch dialect with strong Frisian influence, parallels this distinction (dou, jou, jimme).

West Frisian jo is used slightly more often than Dutch u. Native speakers of Dutch are sometimes warned against addressing newly acquainted people with do too soon.

==== German ====
===== Sie and du =====
In German, the formal address Sie is the same as the third-person plural pronoun sie. Verbs used with this form of address are also identical to third-person plural forms. The polite form and its inflected forms are always capitalized in writing, to avoid any ambiguity.

The corresponding informal German address is du or Du. The verbs duzen and siezen mean respectively "to address using du" and "to address using Sie" and the phrases per du or auf du und du mean, "to be on du terms". The use of Sie often coincides with the use of the title plus surname, usage of which is more widespread in German-speaking areas than Anglophone areas. In general terms, du is used to children, animals, and God, and between adults (or between adults and children) who are good friends of or related to each other. Sie is used in other situations, such as in a business situation or where there is no existing relationship. In Internet chats and forums, Germans rarely use Sie, although there are exceptions. Except in the case of adults addressing children, where it is common for the child to address the adult as Sie, but be addressed as du in return, it is not common in German for one party to address the other as Sie, but be addressed as du in return. In almost all cases it can be considered as impolite to use the "wrong" pronoun, that is a pronoun that is not expected by the other party. However, on the other hand, using an unexpected du can also be a very welcome sign of affection, and using an unexpected Sie can, in the young, be a very welcome sign of appreciation of the addressed one's maturity.

High school students in Germany are often called Sie plus given name (Hamburger Sie) by their teachers when they enter the Oberstufe—the last 2 or 3 years of high school—around the age of 16.

Children and teenagers are expected to use Sie when addressing all adults except for family members and family friends whom they have known since early childhood. Street and similar social workers, sports clubs trainers will sometimes tell children and teens to address them with du. In shops, bars, and other establishments, if they target a younger audience, it is becoming increasingly common for customers and staff to address each other as du, to the degree that it is sometimes considered awkward if a waitress and a customer who are both in their twenties call each other Sie.

The use of du or Sie between two strangers may also be determined by the setting in which they meet (casual/formal), as well as clothing (casual/formal), gender (same/opposite), and personal preference. For example, it is customary to use du in traditional small pubs and taverns in certain regions (including the Rhineland). This applies also to older people, whom one would otherwise address as Sie. Two people who addressed each other as du in a pub may go back to Sie when they meet in the street if their acquaintance was only very superficial. During the famous Rhenish carnival, it is customary for most revelers to address each other as du. Only if the age difference is more than one generation, the younger person might still use Sie. Another setting in which du is often used between adults is sporting events.

Being per du has also become increasingly common in workplace environments (depending on the line of business and corporate culture to varying degrees), mostly regardless of age. In such environments, the du basis may also be observed as a (sometimes necessary) mark of good social integration within a working group. As a rule of thumb, one might expect to see team colleagues on the workplace level in many industries on a customary du basis with each other, though not always with the group manager and more rarely with higher-ranking managers. As entrants to a team are more closely integrated, this is often marked by making an informal affirmation to that basis or by formally offering it, as a matter of style and habituality. Both the tempo and extent of using the du basis depends much on the culture (and sometimes the climate) of the business, and in some places even more so on that of the particular workgroup itself. Business cultures that pride themselves on a "flat hierarchy" are more likely to adopt or accent a general professional parlance of du and given name while inside corporations tending to emphasize professional formality, a Sie may be expected to be used always except between very close colleagues or inside closed groups (sometimes including managers meeting on the same level with the exclusion of any subordinates), and strictly always in the presence of a superior. The superior, on the other hand, has the right to address the other person informally or formally, which is a personal preference.

Customarily, the switch from Sie to du is initially proposed by the elder of the two people, the person with socially higher standing or by the lady to the gentleman. Alternatively, one person may use Sie while they ask the other person if it is acceptable to be addressed informally, and then act accordingly. One way to propose the use of du rather than Sie is by stating one's first name (as in: Ich heiße...). One accepts the proposal by introducing one's own first name. Should a person later forget that they have adopted du, it is polite to remind them by saying, Wir waren doch per du (We moved on to du terms). Sometimes switching back to Sie is used as a method of distancing oneself from the addressee; the connotation is slightly ironic courtesy.

The inappropriate and uninvited use of du towards someone who would otherwise reasonably expect to be addressed as Sie is considered to be condescending and disrespectful, although insistence on Sie in an environment where du is largely accepted (flat hierarchies) can be interpreted as being equally disrespectful. The degree of offense that might be taken will depend on how obvious the etiquette violation was (an example of an obvious violation would be a teenager in the street addressing an elderly stranger on the street with du, addressing a senior manager with du as a result of a misjudged professional relationship would probably be taken with less offense), and will also depend on the upbringing of the person in question—progressive vs. conservative outlooks and age are examples of factors which can play a role in how individuals prefer to be addressed and choose to address others.

It has become the policy of some businesses for their employees to address customers with du, often to set a progressive, "modern" tone, occasionally for other cultural reasons. IKEA, for instance, does this to reflect the widespread use of the du form in Sweden (see Du-reformen).

In Germany, an old custom (called Brüderschaft trinken, drinking brotherhood) involves two friends formally sharing a bottle of wine or drinking a glass of beer together to celebrate their agreement to call one another du rather than Sie. This custom has also been adopted among the Swiss-French of the Jura, in Poland and Russia (called by its German name, spelled bruderszaft and брудершафт respectively), though the custom in Poland is now slowly disappearing. It was formerly found also in Sweden.

Although the use of Sie generally coincides with the use of title plus surname, especially in northern and eastern Germany, there is an intermediate address combining Sie with the first name (Hamburger Sie), whereas in the Berlin region, sometimes Du is combined with the surname (Berliner Du). The former usage also occurs when addressing teenagers, household staff, or guests of TV or radio programs, while the latter style is usually considered inferior and mainly occurs in working class environments, on schoolyards, and in barracks. It may be associated with professional contexts, when colleagues have known one another for a long time, but, e.g. due to differences of status, do not want to switch to the usual du style; or in situations where strangers (e.g. customers) are present for whom it would not be appropriate to learn the first name of the addressee.

When speaking to more than one person in formal situations where one would use Sie to each one of them separately, Standard German uses Sie. However, in this situation ihr can often be heard instead, especially in the South of Germany and in Swiss German dialects, and is standard usage for pastors when preaching. If the Sie standard here is followed, then the usage varies when addressing a group containing both du and Sie persons: Some speakers use the informal plural ihr, others prefer the formal Sie, and many, concerned that both pronouns might cause offence, prefer to use circumlocutions that avoid either pronoun, for example by expressing an imperative in infinitive form (bitte das machen), by applying the passive voice (es wird gemacht), or using the indefinite pronoun man (man macht das).

===== Historical predecessors: Ihr and Er/Sie =====
Formerly, the second-person plural Ihr ("ye") was used to address social superiors, unless more informal relations had been established. The use of Ihr as the polite form, has still survived in Bernese German and other Alemannic dialects, as this is the case with vous in the French language. Ihr in this case has to be capitalized. However, Ihr itself shows a degree of informality, and would for example be used in addressing one's father. For the formal address, the third person would be used; and this in the singular with Er, Sie (capitalized) to a social inferior, as a farmer addressing a stableboy, or in the plural to a social superior. It is from the latter occurrences that modern Sie takes its origin; Sie is the third-person plural pronoun. However, Sie itself is relatively young, and it was rather the formal addresses, often itself singular forms, that took the plural. Even as late as in Dürrenmatt's "The Visit" (written in 1956), an address Das wissen Herr Bürgermeister schon ("You do know that, Mr Mayor", modern German would just say Das wissen Sie schon) can be found; Herr Bürgermeister is the formal address and itself a singular term, but wissen is plural. However, if the formal address itself contains a personal pronoun as in Seine Majestät ("His Majesty") etc., this one would be put to the second-person plural: Was geruhen Euer (not: Seine) Majestät zu befehlen? ("What does [but plural] Your Majesty condescend to order?")

Thus, all these go by a similar grammar rule pertaining to the verb used with these addresses as modern Sie. The dated capitalized address Ihr demands the same verb form as the modern second-person plural pronoun ihr, the dated Er/Sie demands the same verb form as the modern third-person singular er and sie, and the dated third-person plural address without Sie demands, just as Sie itself, the same verb form as the third-person plural pronoun sie ("they").

The forms are still found today in some dialects as a respectful way of addressing elders and are still very often found in works of art and literature (such as books and movies) depicting events at least several centuries in the past, or in a "past-like" fantasy setting, even if modern German is otherwise used in these works; indeed, using the modern Sie in such a setting would be considered an out-of-place anachronism. Ihr and the third-person plural without Sie are somewhat analogous to the English majestic plural.

The Er/Sie form is not widely known or understood by the average person any more, whereas Ihrzen is often still used in dubbed films, especially in medieval/fantasy contexts such as The Lord of the Rings, e.g. "Ihr habt das Reich der Herrin des Waldes betreten, Ihr könnt nicht umkehren" ("you have entered the Realm of the Lady of the Wood, you can not turn back"). In this context, a historical level is used where the second-person plural indicates some nobility of or respect for the addressee, such that from Ihr being used to address a single person, the viewer could mostly, without looking, conclude that the person was of elevated rank such as a king or nobleman, or at least being treated with expressed regard. Ihr would not normally be used to address a peasant (unless he is a prince in disguise or a future prince and the person addressing him has gathered some knowledge or presumption thereof).

==== Scots ====
In Modern Scots the second-person singular nominative thoo ([ðuː], Southern Scots [ðʌu], Shetland dialect [duː]) survived in colloquial speech until the mid 19th century in most of lowland Scotland. It has since been replaced by ye/you in most areas except in Insular Scots where thee ([ðiː], Shetland dialect [diː]) is also used, in North Northern Scots and in some Southern Scots varieties. Thoo is used as the familiar form by parents speaking to children, elders to youngsters, or between friends or equals. The second-person formal singular ye or you is used when speaking to a superior or when a youngster addresses an elder. The older second-person singular possessive thy ([ðai]), and thee ([ði], Shetland dialect [diː] along with thine(s) [dəin(z)]) still survive to some extent where thoo remains in use.

=== North Germanic languages ===
==== Danish ====
In Danish, the informal second-person singular is du and the formal form of address uses the third-person plural De, capitalized to distinguish it from its other use. The second-person plural I and the third-person singular han ("he") or hun ("she") were sometimes used until the early 19th century in standard Danish and awhile longer in the countryside. The German-inspired form De entered Danish in the 18th century, too late to enter liturgical use. In church, as in rural or dialect-speaking areas, du has always been the universal form, especially in Jutland.

As in other Scandinavian languages, even among the prestige dialects, the formal pronoun is waning in use—in the case of Danish, since Ungdomsoprøret ("The Youth Revolts") during and after the protests of 1968. As a general rule, the informal du is accepted everywhere today, except when addressing royalty (Note: Some members of the royal family insist upon it. During a 2010 interview with a TV 2 journalist on board the training ship Danmark, Prince Joachim pointedly refused to answer a question posed in the du form until the reporter rephrased it as De. The public debate then centered around whether the prince had demonstrated snobbishness, the journalist ignorance, or both.) or during military service. In other contexts, it has come to seem excessively formal and old-fashioned to most Danes. (Note: A 2012 survey found that only 6% of Danes would use De towards anyone they met and 16% would self-consciously never use it. However, 64% accepted its use towards members of the Danish royal family.) Even at job interviews and among parliamentarians, du has become standard.

In written Danish, De remains current in legal, legislative, and formal business documents, as well as in some translations from other languages. This is sometimes audience-dependent, as in the Danish government's general use of du except in healthcare information directed towards the elderly, (Note: The same 2012 survey said 46% of Danes use De when speaking towards the elderly, out of respect. At the same time, the elderly were much more supportive of abolishing the word entirely.) where De is still used. Other times, it is maintained as an affectation, as by the staff of some formal restaurants, the Weekendavisen newspaper, TV 2 announcers, and the avowedly conservative Maersk corporation. Attempts by other corporations to avoid sounding either stuffy or too informal by employing circumlocutions—using passive phrasing or using the pronoun man ("one")—have generally proved awkward and been ill-received, and (with the notable exception of the national railway DSB) most have opted for the more personable du form.

==== Icelandic ====
Modern Icelandic is the Scandinavian language closest to Old Norse, which made a distinction between the plural þér and the dual þið. This distinction continued in written Icelandic the early 1920 when the plural þér was also used on formal occasions. The formal usage of þér seems to have pushed the dual þið to take over the plural so modern Icelandic normally uses þið as a plural. However, in formal documents such as by the president þér is still used as plural, and the usage of þér as plural and þið as dual is still retained in the Icelandic translation of the Christian scriptures. There are still a number of fixed expressions—particularly religious adages such as "seek and ye shall find" (leitið og þér munuð finna)—and the formal pronoun is sometimes used in translations from a language that adheres to a T–V distinction, but otherwise it appears only when one wants to be excessively formal either from the gravity of the occasion (as in court proceedings and legal correspondence) or out of contempt (in order to ridicule another person's self-importance), and þú is used in all other cases.

==== Norwegian ====
In Norwegian, the polite form De/Dem (Bokmål) and De/Dykk (Nynorsk) has more or less disappeared in both spoken and written language. Norwegians now exclusively use du, and the polite form does not have a strong cultural pedigree in the country. Until recently, De would sometimes be found in written works, business letters, plays and translations where an impression of formality must be retained. The popular belief that De is reserved for the king is incorrect, since according to royal etiquette, the King (and other members of the royal family) will be addressed as Deres majestet (Bokmål)/Dykkar majestet (Nynorsk) (Your majesty) or in third-person singular as Hans majestet (His majesty), Hennes majestet/Hennar majestet (Her majesty), Kongen (the King), Dronningen (the Queen) and similar.

Norwegians generally refer to one another by first name only, unless the person is better known by full or last name only. This also contributes to the weakening of these pronouns and a general pattern of declining use of polite speech. For example, a student might address their professor by their first name, but would refer to a leading politician by their last name. Norwegian politicians and celebrities are sometimes referred to by their first names, especially in newspaper headlines, while the text of the article most likely would use the person's last name. Nicknames are not very common.

The distinction between Bokmål and Nynorsk exists primarily for written Norwegian (most Norwegians speak dialects that differ from the standard written forms), and the T–V rules are the same for both forms—except that Bokmål uses the third-person plural to indicate politeness (as in German), while Nynorsk uses the second-person plural (as in French). In both forms, when these pronouns are used to indicate politeness, they are always capitalised (to show deference, and separate them from when they indicate, respectively, the third- and second-person plural).

==== Swedish ====
In Swedish, there has in the last two centuries been a marked difference between usage in Finland Swedish and that of Sweden.

In the Swedish of Sweden, the polite Ni survived from earlier epochs, but had come to be considered somewhat careless, bullying or rude; instead, an intricate system had evolved in order to prudently step around pronouns almost completely. Parts of this system began to erode around the Second World War or so, but the essentials held up into the 1960s.

As the 20th century progressed, Swedish speakers increasingly came to find this circumlocutive system of addressing, with its innumerable ambiguities and opportunities for unintentional offence, as a nuisance. In the 1960s, the so-called du-reformen ('thou-reform') began among progressive sectors of the intellectual and political elite. First, authorities and influential circles tried rehabilitating the Ni in a so-called "ni reform"—but most people could not bring themselves to feel civil using that. Then, almost overnight in what became known as the "du reform", the system broke down, and du (noted as informal above) became the accepted way of addressing anyone except for royalty.

Addressing royalty went somewhat more slowly from a universal Ers majestät ('Your Majesty'), etc., to that address only on formal occasions, otherwise replaced by third-person (singular if the addressee is single) with title (K(on)ungen 'the King', etc.).

These rules still apply, with marginal exceptions. The vast majority of Swedes, including younger people in most or all situations, stick to du. In order to "alleviate the intrusion" in writing, e.g. in letters or in advertisement, the Du can be capitalized. That usage was most widespread in the early days of universal du-address; it has become slightly more common again simultaneously with the partial Ni revival.

Finland Swedish has undergone a similar development to mainland Swedish since the 1960s, but more slowly and slightly less radically. In Finland one may have to reckon with influence from the Finnish language, still slightly more conservative. In Finland Swedish, the second-person plural form Ni (noted as formal above) was indeed the traditional respectful address to a single person up to the 1970s or so.

Swedish also has verbs for the addresses: dua 'to say du', and nia 'to say ni'.

=== Romance languages ===
==== Catalan ====
Catalan uses the singular pronouns tu (informal) and vostè (formal), while vosaltres (informal) and vostès (formal) are used for two or more addressees. The form vós, used instead of tu to address someone respectfully, follows the same concordance rules as the French vous (verbs in second-person plural, adjectives in singular), and vostè follows the same concordance rules as the Spanish usted (verbs in third person). Vostè originated from vostra mercè as a calque from Spanish, and replaced the original Catalan form vós.

In some dialects, vós is no longer used in the singular. Other dialects have a three-way distinction tu / vós / vostè, where vós is used as a respectful form for elders and respected friends, and vostè for foreigners and people whom one does not know well. Vostè is more distant than vós.

The Administration uses vós to address people.

==== French ====
In most French-speaking regions (with some exceptions, see North American and Ivorian French below), a rigid T–V distinction is upheld. With regard to the second-person singular, tu is used informally, whereas vous is used to convey formality. The second-person plural is always vous. The formal vous is expected when encountering any unknown adult under normal circumstances. In general, the switch from vous to tu is "negotiated" on a case-by-case basis; it can happen nearly unconsciously, or can be explicitly negotiated. For instance, some couples have been known to call each other vous for some time while dating, and gradually switch to calling each other tu. The verb tutoyer means "address someone with tu-forms, speak informally"; by contrast vouvoyer means "address someone with vous forms". Rigidly sticking to vous can become equally awkward in a long-standing relationship.

In certain circumstances, however, tu is used more broadly. For example, new acquaintances who are conscious of having something socially significant in common (e.g., student status, or the same "rank" in some hierarchy) often use tu more or less immediately. In some cases, there may be an explicitly defined practice in a particular company, political party, as to the use of tu and vous. Also, using the vous in conjunction with someone's given name is rather current in France as a less formal way of addressing someone, e.g. at work, among members of an association etc. Children and adolescents generally use tu to speak with someone of their own age, whether known or not. Tu can also be used to show disrespect to a stranger, such as when surprising a thief or cursing other drivers on the road.

Vous may be used to distance oneself from a person with whom one does not want to interact. Additionally, two people who use tu in their private interactions may consciously switch back to vous in public in order to act appropriately in a formal or professional environment, to play the part in an artificially constructed situation (such as between co-hosts of a television show), or simply to conceal the nature of their relationship from others.

In families, vous was traditionally used to address older family members. Children were taught to use vous to address their parents, and vous was used until about 1950 between spouses of the higher classes. Former president Jacques Chirac and his wife Bernadette served as a prominent example of the continuation of this usage.

When praying, tu is nowadays often used in addressing the deity, though vous was used in Catholic prayers until the Second Vatican Council, and is still used to address the Blessed Virgin Mary. In Louisiana, however, vous is always used to convey a sense of respect and reverence when praying.

In the ancien régime, the use of honorific styles or their abbreviation Elle (literally she, irrespective of the gender of the addressee, as the honorifics were feminine nouns) together with the third-person singular was also common. See below for Italian which has kept this style.

==== Galician ====
Galician uses the personal pronouns ti (in Eastern and part of Central Galician, tu) and vós as the singular informal second person and plural informal second person respectively. Formality is expressed by the use of vostede, instead of ti, with the verb conjugated in singular third-person form. The plural form is vostedes.

In Galicia, it is common to see instructions and written information, like in museums and bus stops, using the formal pronoun vostede to address the reader. However, it is more likely that a worker and costumer use ti/tu when communicating, or to switch to Spanish with informal pronouns (see Spanish below), than using the formal pronoun vostede.

==== Italian ====
In Standard Italian the informal second-person singular pronoun is tu and the formal second-person singular pronoun is Lei (inf. "she", lit. "her"), always used with the third-person singular conjugation of the verb. The pronouns may be freely omitted. Despite the original meaning of lei, modern Italian typically concords with the gender of the addressee when lei is the sentence subject; using feminine adjectives for a male addressee is not insulting. When lei is an object, using feminine adjectives is normal (l'ho vista, i.e. "I saw you (m.)"), whereas gender concord is considered non-standard (l'ho visto, i.e. "I saw you (m.)).

Lei is normally used in formal settings or with strangers, although it implies a sense of distance (even coldness) similar to the French use of vous. Presently Italian adults prefer to employ tu towards strangers until around 30 years old. It is used reciprocally between adults; the usage may not be reciprocal when young people address older strangers or otherwise respected people. Students are addressed with tu by their teachers until the end of high school with few exceptions and usually with Lei in universities. Students might use tu with their teachers in elementary school, but switch to Lei from middle school. Tu is the common form of address on the Internet and within some professions – such as journalism and law – as a recognition of comradeship. In law school, however the tu is only used in informal settings; in the courtroom it is used only to small children, if ever any happens to appear there. The second-person plural pronoun is voi. Its polite counterpart is Loro ("They"), but it is now little used outside of very formal situations.

Voi is the traditional polite form of address in Tuscan dialects: Dante employs it in his 14th-century Divine Comedy when showing particular respect. Lei began to replace it during the Renaissance and then, under Spanish influence, it became common to contract obsequious honorifics such as "Your Lordship", "Eminence", and "Majesty", all of which are feminine third-person singular nouns in Italian (Vostra Signoria, Eminenza, Maestà). Over the next four centuries, all three pronouns—tu, Voi, Lei—were employed together to express degrees of formality and status, as displayed in Manzoni's 19th-century The Betrothed. Voi continues to be used by some speakers, particularly of Southern dialects, as an alternative to Lei in polite address, but its use is increasingly uncommon. The use of Voi was imposed by the Fascists from 1938 to 1944, on grounds of purism. Voi still appears in comics, and in instruction books and advertisements where Lei would sound too distant, but in the latter case most of the time it is used directly as a plural and not as a polite singular.

Although seldom encountered, the third person la Signoria Vostra or la S.V. is sometimes seen in formal correspondence and invitations, as a stronger form of its descendant Lei.

A historical example of all three forms of address in action is in Lampedusa's The Leopard, when the Prince proposes on his nephew's behalf to the daughter of the rich but plebeian mayor, the latter suddenly switches from using the style of Your Excellency and the form Lei to the style of Prince and the form Voi: still respectful, but with much shorter social distance. Another example is the Italian The Lord of the Rings translation: a character such as Aragorn is usually addressed as Lei, but neither Lei nor tu seemed appropriate for how Samwise addresses his higher-class friend and employer Frodo; Sam calls Frodo Voi, in consequence.

==== Portuguese ====
===== Brazilian Portuguese =====
For the most part, in Brazilian Portuguese, você and vocês (singular and plural "you", respectively) are used as the V form in more relaxed situations (for example, between two strangers with the same age in the streets), while o senhor and a senhora ("Mr"/"Sir" and "Mrs"/"Madam", plurals os senhores and as senhoras) are used in formal speech, as well as towards elders. Although now seen as archaic, a senhorita is used when speaking ironically, very formally or when one is demonstrating respect to a superior and it is sometimes replaced by moça ("Lady"). Informal terms of respect to superiors, elders, or strangers are Seu (abbreviation of senhor) and Dona (feminine of Dom i.e. Don). Moço/rapaz and moça ("Lad"/"Young man" and "Lady") are used by seniors when addressing non-intimate youths and also as an equalizing form among strange youths. Jovem ("youngster") is used in the same manner by elders when addressing strange youths of both genders.

On premises where the atmosphere requires extreme formality like the Senate or different courts, the protocolar forms to address dignitaries Vossa Excelência ("Your Excellence") and Vossa Senhoria ("Your Lordship/Ladyship") can still be heard. In a direct address to a judge or the president, Vossa Excelência must follow the vocatives Meritíssimo/a ("Your Honour", literally "full of merit") and Sr/Sra Presidente ("Mr/Mrs" President). When addressing an ecclesiastical dignitary the form Vossa Reverência ("Your Reverence") is used. Although Vossa Senhoria is regarded as protocolar, it is an equalizing form.

In some parts of the country and in television speech (that used by reporters and actors, for instance) você is used even between intimate speakers. In other parts of the geographic extension of the language e.g. most of Southern and Northeastern Brazil, some sociolects of coastal São Paulo, mainly in Greater Santos, colloquial carioca sociolect, mainly among the less educated and some all-class youths of Greater Rio de Janeiro, and in Uruguay, tu (singular "you" or simply "thou") is used informally, but the plural form is always vocês. For the overwhelming majority of people, the pronoun tu is commonly used with the verb conjugated as você (third-person singular) rather than in the traditional conjugation (second-person singular). Tu is somewhat familiar, even intimate, and should never be addressed to superiors, or strange elders, while você is much more neutral, although equalizing.

The dialect that includes Florianópolis, capital city of Santa Catarina, as well as its shore and inner regions in the proximity like Blumenau, is an exception, as the use of tu is widespread, even addressing formally to an authority or to a superior. It is one of the few dialects in Brazil in which second-person singular agreement is used (along with the relatively conservative dialect of the state of Maranhão).

===== European Portuguese =====
In European Portuguese (as well as in Africa, East Timor and Macau), tu (singular "you") is commonly used as the familiar addressing pronoun, while você is a general form of address; vocês (plural both of tu and você) is used for both familiar and general. The forms o senhor and a senhora (plurals os senhores and as senhoras) are used for more formal situations (roughly equivalent to "Mr/Sir" and "Mrs/Madam".) Similarly to some Romance languages (e.g. Italian), tu, você or o senhor / a senhora can be omitted because the verb ending provides the necessary information. The second-person plural pronoun vós, from Latin vos, is archaic in most of the Portuguese-speaking world, but can be heard in liturgy and poetry, and has a limited regional use.

==== Romanian ====
The Romanian word dumneavoastră when used for the second-person singular formal takes plural verbs but singular adjectives, similar to French vous. It is used roughly in the same manner as in Continental French and shows no signs of disappearing. It is also used as a more formal voi. It originates from domnia voastră – your lordship. In the past it was used extreme rarely to nobles especially, but its sense extended to other people in the 20th century but not so common and when the communists arrived it took the actual form. As happens with all subject pronouns, dumneavoastră is often omitted from sentences, its use being implied by verbs in the second-person plural form.

The form dumneata (originating from domnia ta – thy lordship) is less distant than dumneavoastră and somewhat midway between tu and dumneavoastră. The verb is conjugated, as for tu, in the second-person singular form. Older people towards younger people and peers favor dumneata. Its use is gradually declining.

A more colloquial form of dumneata is mata, matale or tălică. It is more familiar than tu and is used only in some regions of Romania. It is used only with immediate family members, and is spelled and pronounced the same in all cases, similar to dumneavoastră. It is used with verbs in the second-person singular, as is tu.

The plural form is a recent borrowing. Proto-Romanian and Aromanian, like Classical Latin, do not have the plural form.

==== Sicilian ====
Most dialects of the Sicilian language have utilised vussìa, vossìa, or vassa to express formality. However, due to encroachment by the Italian language Lei has become increasingly common particularly among younger speakers.

==== Spanish ====
In Peninsular, Mexican, and Peruvian Spanish, as in Italian, an original tú and vos usage similar to French disappeared in the Early Modern period. Today, tú is used for informal and familiar address while the respectful form is the third-person usted, which can be used respectfully to anyone. Scholars agree that usted evolved as a contraction of the Old Spanish Vuestra Merced ("your grace"), with vusted as a transitional form. In some cases, the title Don is also employed when speaking to a respected older man, while Doña is used for older women.

Among Spanish dialects, the situation is complicated by the fact that the Spanish Empire was created during the middle of this linguistic shift, and geographically remote regions did not participate fully in it. The region surrounding the Colombian capital of Bogotá (although not the city itself) preserves an alternate respectful form sumercé simplified from a different contraction of vuestra merced. In Rioplatense (Argentinian, Uruguayan) Spanish, vos was preserved—but as a replacement for tú and not as a respectful form of address; in Chile, in Western Venezuela, parts of Colombia and in Central America, vos is used in spoken address and tú is used in print and to express moderate formality, that is, it has essentially switched its function to the former role of vos. In Costa Rica and part of Colombia, usted is used as the common pronoun, using it both in formal and informal situations.

In the second-person plural, modern Spanish speakers in most of Spain employ vosotros (masculine) and vosotras (feminine) informally and (as the third-person plural) ustedes to express respect. In western Andalusia, ustedes is used in both contexts, but its verbs are conjugated in the second-person plural. Throughout the Americas and the Canaries, ustedes is used in all contexts and in the third person.

In peninsular Spain, the use of usted/ustedes has been diminishing in recent decades and may disappear in the near future. It is seldom used by younger speakers, even when addressing an older person, or in situations that would be considered formal by people one generation their senior.

In Equatoguinean and Philippine Spanish, tú and usted are interchangeable.

==== Judeo-Spanish (Ladino) ====
Judeo-Spanish (Ladino), which diverged just as Old Spanish was evolving into modern Spanish, lacks the pronouns usted and ustedes. In most dialects, it uses vos for the second-person formal singular, which takes second-person plural endings. Vozotros/vozotras is used for the second-person plural, whether formal or informal. In some dialects, however, it uses el, eya, and eyos instead of vos and vozotros/vozotras.

=== Hellenic languages ===
==== Ancient and Hellenistic or Koine Greek ====
In Ancient Greek, sý (σύ) was the singular, and hymeis (ὑμεῖς) the plural, with no distinction for honorific or familiar. Paul addresses King Agrippa II as sý (Acts 26:2).

Later, hymeís and hēmeís (ἡμεῖς,"we") became too close in pronunciation, and a new plural seís or eseís (σεις/εσείς) was invented, the initial e (ε) being a euphonic prefix that was also extended to the singular (sý/esý).

==== Modern Greek ====
In Modern Greek, εσείς (eseís, second-person plural) with second-person plural verb conjugation is used as the formal counterpart of εσύ (esý, second-person singular) when talking to strangers and elders, although in everyday life it is common to speak to strangers of one's age or younger using the singular pronoun. In addition, the informal second-person singular is used even with older people someone is acquainted with, depending on the level of mutual familiarity.

Since the formal εσείς (eseís) has become less common outside schools and workplaces, many people often do not know which form to use (because using a formal version might sound too snobbish even to an elder and using the informal version might sound inappropriate to some strangers) and thus prefer to replace verbs with nouns (avoiding the dilemma) until enough information on the counterpart's intentions is gathered in order to choose between formal or informal second-person pronoun and verb conjugation. A good rule of thumb is that singular accompanies first names and plural accompanies surnames with title (Mr, Mrs, etc.). Exceptions are rare, for example younger schoolchildren may address their teacher in the plural, title and first name, or an officer may address a soldier in the singular and surname. The sequence singular–title–surname is a faux pas that can often indicate lack of education, of good manners, or of both.

The modern social custom when using Greek in Greece is to ask the other person "may we speak in the singular?" in which the other person is expected to answer "yes" and afterwards the discussion continues using the informal εσύ (esý); it is unthinkable for the other person to answer "no" or show preference for plural forms, and for this reason one should not even ask this question to a person of high status, such as a professional. Therefore, asking this question can itself be considered a form of disrespect in some social situations. Likewise, not asking this question and simply using the singular without prior explicit or implicit agreement would also be considered disrespectful in various social contingencies. In other cases, even using the formal plural (without a question) could also be considered offensive. A person being inappropriately addressed in the singular will often indicate their displeasure by insisting on responding in the plural, in a display of irony that may or may not be evident to the other party. A similar social custom exists with the words κύριε (Mr/Sir) and κυρία (Mrs/Madam), which can show both respect and a form of "mock respect" essentially communicating disapproval, often depending on the voice intonation and the social situation. Overall, the distinction between formal and informal forms of address and when to use each can be quite subtle and not easily discernible by a non-native speaker.

Cypriot Greek traditionally had no T–V distinction, with even persons of very high social status addressed in the singular, usually together with an honorific or title such as δάσκαλε ("teacher", mainly for priests) or μάστρε (literally "master", loosely "sir"). Even today, the singular form is used much more frequently in Cyprus compared to Greece, although this is changing under the influence of Standard Modern Greek. The plural form is now expected in a formal setting.

=== Celtic ===
==== Scottish Gaelic ====
In Scottish Gaelic, the informal form of the second-person singular is thu/tu (emphatic: thusa/tusa), used when addressing a person the speaker knows well, or when addressing a person younger or relatively the same age as the speaker. When addressing a superior, an elder, or a stranger, or in conducting business, the form sibh (emphatic: sibhse) is used. (Sibh is also the second-person plural). This distinction carries over into prepositional pronouns: for instance, agad and agaibh (at you), riut and ribh (against you), romhad and romhaibh (before you), etc., and into possessive pronouns do and ur (your).

==== Irish ====
In Irish, the use of sibh as an address to one person has died out, and tú is preferred. Formerly, Roman Catholic priests were addressed with the plural form sibh, especially in Ulster, due to the possibility that the priest may be carrying the Eucharist on his person—belief in the real presence of Christ in the Eucharist would require the use of the plural.

==== Welsh, Cornish, and Breton ====
Modern Welsh, Cornish, and Breton all retain a T–V distinction to varying degrees.

In spoken Welsh, the plural pronoun chi is used when speaking to strangers, elders or superiors, while ti (or chdi in some parts of the North) is used with friends, close family, animals, and children. Ti is also the form used when addressing God. Nonetheless, the use of chi and ti varies between families and regions, but those guidelines are generally observed.

Chwi is an alternative to chi found in very formal literary language. Alongside the usages explained above, those born before 1945 would, in their youth, use chi with a girl of about the same age. Similarly to Italian, the third-person singular is used by some speakers in the former Dyfed region of west Wales; it appears, however, that the pronoun used—between either e or fe (masculine, South), o or fo (masculine, North) and hi (feminine)—depends on the gender of the listener.

A similar distinction exists between Cornish singular ty / chy and plural hwi / whi. The singular form is used when talking to friends, family, animals, and children, and the plural form is used to talk to a group of people, or when being especially polite to one person.

In Breton the second-person plural c'hwi is used as a polite form when addressing a single person and the singular te is reserved for informal situations. However, in a large area of central Brittany the singular form has been entirely replaced by c'hwi, as in English.

=== Balto-Slavic languages ===
==== Belarusian, Russian, and Ukrainian (mainly Eastern) ====
East Slavic Languages distinguish between the familiar ty (ты) and the respectful vy (вы), the latter also being the plural of both forms. (Respectful Vy (Вы) may be capitalised in formal written correspondence, while plural vy is not.) The distinction appeared relatively recently and began to gain currency among the educated classes in the 18th century through French influence.

Generally, ty is used among friends and relatives, but the usage depends not only on the closeness of the relationship but also on age and the formality of the situation (e.g., work meeting vs. a party). Children always use ty to address each other and are addressed in this way by adults but are taught to address adults with vy. Younger adults typically also address older adults outside the family as vy regardless of intimacy, and may be addressed as ty in return. When talking to each other young people often start with the formal vy but may transition to ty very quickly in an informal situation. Among older people, ty is often reserved for closer acquaintances. Unless there is a substantial difference in age, the choice of the form is symmetric: if A uses ty to address B, then B also uses ty to address A. While people may transition quickly from vy to ty, such transition presumes mutual agreement. Use of ty without consent of the other person is likely to be viewed as poor conduct or even as an insult (or, in the case of opposite-sexed people, overly flirtatious), particularly if the other party maintains using vy.

Historically, the rules used to be more class-specific: as late as at the end of the 19th century, it was accepted in some circles (in aristocracy and especially gentry) that vy was to be used also between friends, between husband and wife, and when addressing one's parents (but not one's children), all of which situations today would strongly call for using ty. Meanwhile, up to this day, common people, especially those living in rural areas, hardly ever use the polite vy. Russian and Belarusian speakers online uphold the distinction and mainly use vy for strangers, although in the earlier days of internet it was more common and expected to use ty to address everyone.

The choice between ty and vy is closely related to, yet sometimes different from, the choice of the addressing format—that is, the selection from the first name, patronymics, last name, and the title to be used when addressing the person. Normally, ty is associated with the informal addressing by first name only (or, even more informally, by the patronymic only), whereas vy is associated with the more formal addressing format of using the first name together with patronymics (roughly analogous to "title followed by last name" in English) or the last name together with a title (the last name is almost never used together with either of the other two names to address someone, although such combinations are routinely used to introduce or mention someone). However, nowadays, vy can also be employed while addressing by first name only.

In Ukrainian, the present practice is essentially the same as in Russian. Historically, this was primarily the case in the Eastern, Russian-ruled part of Ukraine. Until about 1945, due to Polish influence, the practices in the former Galicia and Volyn regions, tended to more closely resemble the Polish practices, as described below. But since those areas became annexed to the Soviet Union, the East Ukrainian and Russian practices have become prevalent all over Ukraine, with the панство panstvo, прошу пана proshu pana, прошу пані proshu pani, etc. forms only being preserved in the émigré diaspora.

==== Serbo-Croatian ====
In all standard forms of Serbo-Croatian, i.e. Serbian, Croatian, Montenegrin, and Bosnian, the use of ti is limited to friends and family, and used among children. In any formal use, vi, the second-person plural, is used only; ti can be used among peers in a workplace but is rare in official documents. It is a common misconception, even among native speakers, that vi is always capitalized when used in formal tone; Vi is capitalized only in direct personal correspondence between two persons.

With the polite vi, masculine plural (in participles and adjectives) is used regardless of the sex of the person addressed.

==== Macedonian ====
Macedonian distinguishes between familiar ti (ти) and respectful vie (вие)—which is also the plural of both forms, used to address a pair or group. (Respectful Vie may be capitalized, while plural vie is not.) Generally, ti is used among friends and relatives, but the usage depends not only on the closeness of the relationship but also on age and the formality of the situation (e.g., work meeting vs. a party). Children always use ti to address each other and are addressed in this way by adults, but are taught to address adults with vie. Younger adults typically also address older adults outside the family as vie regardless of intimacy, and may be addressed as ti in return. When talking to each other young people often start with the formal vie, but may transit to ti very quickly in an informal situation. Among older people, ti is often reserved for closer acquaintances. Unless there is a substantial difference in age, the choice of the form is symmetric: if A uses ti to address B, then B also uses ti to address A. While people may transit quickly from vie to ti, such transition presumes mutual agreement. Use of ti without consent of the other person is likely to be viewed as poor conduct or even as an insult, particularly if the other party maintains using vie.

==== Polish ====
Polish uses as formal forms the words pan (meaning "mister" or "gentleman") and pani ("lady"), and in the plural panowie ("gentlemen") and panie ("ladies") respectively, państwo being used for mixed groups (originally a neutral noun, meaning roughly "lordship", but also, and even today, "state"). Państwo is used with the plural, like panowie and panie. Because of their character as nouns (and not pronouns) these words are used with the third person: For example, the familiar Chcesz pić ("You want to drink") becomes Pan chce pić (literally "The gentleman wants to drink").

Further, pan and pani can be combined with the first name, the last name and with titles like "President", "Professor", "Doctor", "Editor", "Mecenas" and others (Pan Prezydent, pani profesor etc.; using these titles is considered necessary); using both (Pan Prezydent Kowalski, pani profesor Nowak) is considered more polite or, in some context, even submissive. Addressing a present person with the last name is only usual in court or in other affairs, where government authority is involved, and generally considered impolite or condescending. When addressing someone, all these forms always require the vocative case, which is otherwise optional (for example panie Kowalski ("Mr Kowalski!"), pani Joanno ("Mrs Joanna!"), panie profesorze ("Professor!")). For pan, pani etc. alone, proszę + genitive is used instead of vocative: proszę pana, proszę pani, proszę panów, proszę pań and proszę państwa.

The V-forms are capitalized only in actual letters (or e-mails), where the T-forms ty and wy are also capitalized.

Plural wy is also used as V-form in dialects, for example Matko, co wy jecie? ("Mother, what are you eating?"). Following its Russian usage, the plural V-form was also promoted in the Polish language from 1945, becoming associated with Communist ideology and addressing of a person by a government or Party official.

Besides, other forms can be sometimes used like pan in third person when talking to older family members (Niech mama powie, "May mother say"), to clergy (Tak, dobrze ksiądz trafił, "Yes, priest got it right") or to other people in less formal or semi-formal situations, e.g. polite quarrel or dispute (Zatem – proszę kolegi – niech kolega się trochę douczy, a potem poucza innych, "Also, may my dear friend please learn more and only then instruct others").

==== Slovene ====
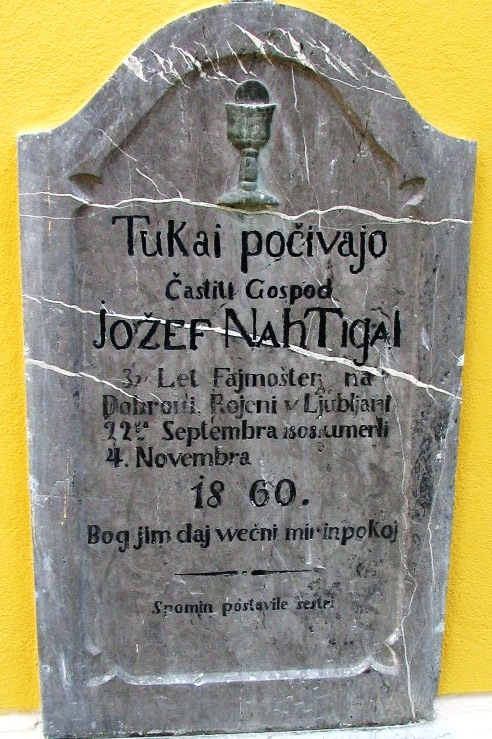
Tombstone of Jožef Nahtigal in Dobrova with archaic Slovene onikanje in indirect reference. Literal translation "Here lie [počivajo] the honorable Jožef Nahtigal … they were born [rojeni] … they died [umerli] … God grant them [jim] eternal peace and rest."

In Slovenian, although informal address using the second-person singular ti form (known as tikanje) is officially limited to friends and family, talk among children, and addressing animals, it is increasingly used instead of its polite or formal counterpart using the second-person plural vi form (known as vikanje).

There is an additional nonstandard but widespread use of a singular participle combined with a plural auxiliary verb (known as polvikanje) that also reveals the gender of the person and is used in somewhat less formal situations:

- Vi ga niste videli. ('You did not see him': both the auxiliary verb niste and the participle videli are plural masculine.)
- Vi ga niste videl/videla. ('You did not see him': the auxiliary verb niste is plural but the participle videl/videla is singular masculine/feminine.)

The use of the third-person plural oni form (known as onikanje in both direct address and indirect reference) as an ultra-polite form is now archaic or dialectal; it is associated with servant-master relationships in older literature, the child-parent relationship in certain conservative rural communities, and in general with relationships with people of highest respect (parents, clergy, royalty).

Similar to onikanje, but less common, was also onokanje, where third person was used instead of second in all numbers.

Gender can also change. In vikanje and onikanje forms, all words referring to the subject are in masculine forms, in polvikanje this is only limited to pronouns. In onokanje, all words referring to the subject are in neuter forms.

==== Czech ====
In Czech, there are three levels of formality. The most formal is using the second-person plural verb forms (V form) with the surname or title of the addressed person, usual between strangers or people in a professional relationship. The second common form is made by using the second-person singular verb forms (T form) together with the given name of the other person, used between friends and in certain social groups (students etc.). The third form, which is rather less common, is using the V form in combination with the given name. It may be used by a teacher when addressing a student (especially at the secondary school level), by a boss addressing their secretary, or in other relationships where a certain degree of familiarity has developed, but has not superseded some level of mutually acknowledged respect or distance. This form of address is usually asymmetrical (the perceived social superior uses V form in combination with the first name, the perceived social inferior using V form and the surname or honorific), less often symmetrical. Using the singular verb forms together with the surname or title is considered very rude. Where a stranger introduces themself with title (like inženýr Novák, doktor Svoboda), it is considered more polite to address them using the V form in combination with their title (always preceded by the honorific paní/pane, i.e. Mr/Ms), rather than their surname. However, it is considered poor manners to address somebody with their title in combination with the T form.

Traditionally, use of the informal form was limited for relatives, very close friends, and for children. During the second half of the 20th century, use of the informal form grew significantly among coworkers, youth, and members of organisations and groups. The formal form is always used in official documents and when dealing with a stranger (especially an older one) as a sign of respect. 2nd-person pronouns (Ty, Tvůj, Vy, Váš) are often capitalized in letters, e-mails, advertisement, etc. The V verbs always end with te. A variant of the formal form modeled after German Sie (Oni/oni, Jejich/jejich, verb onikat) was frequently used during the 19th century but has since disappeared. This form is also associated with the Czech Jewish community before Second World War, and still appears very often in Jewish humour as sign of local colour. Sometimes it is used as irony.

During the Communist times (i.e., before 1989 in Czechoslovakia) there was a spirit of friendliness forced upon people, where everybody was forced to use T-form with calling each other “comrade” (“soudruhu/soudružko” in Czech). It was felt as a form of light opposition to the regime to use traditional Czech T-V forms and calling each other “Mr/Mrs” (“pane/paní” in Czech).

In the Internet age, where people communicate under nicknames or pseudonyms and almost solely in an informal way, capitalizing (ty/Ty) is used to emphasise respect, or simply presence of respect. (Ty = friends, honored acquaintance, strangers ty = basic form, vy/Vy = most formal, capitalized to show respect, used to create distance).

In grammar, plural forms are used in personal and possessive pronouns (vy – you, váš – your) and in verbs, but not in participles and adjectives, they are used in singular forms (when addressing a single person). This differs from some other Slavic languages (Slovak, Russian, etc.)

One person informal (tykání)	One person formal (vykání)	More people (both formal and informal)	English
ty děláš	vy děláte	vy děláte	you do
dělal jsi	dělal jste	dělali jste	you did
jsi hodný	jste hodný	jste hodní	you are kind
byl jsi přijat	byl jste přijat	byli jste přijati	you were accepted

Greetings are also connected with T–V distinction. Formal dobrý den (good day) and na shledanou (good-bye) are used with formal vy, while ahoj, nazdar, čau (meaning both hello, hi, and bye) are informal and used with ty.

==== Lithuanian ====
In Lithuanian, historically, aside from familiar tu and respectful jūs or Jūs, also used to express plural, there was a special form tamsta, mostly referred to in third-person singular (although referring in second-person singular is also not uncommon). This form was used to communicate with a stranger who has not earned particular respect (a beggar, for example). Modern Lithuanian Dictionary describes tamsta as a polite form of second singular person tu, making its meaning somewhere in the middle between informal tu and formal jūs. Through the Soviet occupation period, however, this form was mostly replaced by standard neutral form drauge (the vocative case for draugas, "comrade", the latter being the standard formal form of addressing in all languages of the Soviet Union used in all situations, from "comrade Stalin" to "comrade student"), and by now tamsta is used sparsely. A common way of addressing people whom one doesn't know well is also Ponas (m) and Ponia (f), from Polish forms of address pan and pani, respectively.

=== Indo-Aryan languages ===
==== Hindustani (Hindi-Urdu) ====
In the standard forms of Hindustani (both Hindi as well as Urdu) there are three levels of honorifics:

- आप آپ āp [aːp]: The formal V-form used to address another person. Used with third-person verbs or separate honorific verb forms in all formal settings and when speaking to persons who are senior in age or social hierarchy. No difference between the singular and the plural; plural reference can, however, be indicated by the use of "you people" (आप लोग آپ لوگ āp log) or "you all" (आप सब آپ سب āp sab). In certain Western Hindi dialects, it is sometimes combined with a second-person verb when speaking to persons lower in social hierarchy or, generally, to reduce distance while avoiding the informal flavour of tum. This form is, however, strictly dialectal and is neither used in standard registers of Hindustani (both Hindi as well as Urdu), nor in the Eastern Hindi dialects. Āp should always be used for strangers and, especially in Urdu, is the preferred pronoun for normal conversation.
- तुम تُم tum [tʊm]: Originally, a plural pronoun ("you"), it is nowadays used as singular V-form in all informal settings and when speaking to persons who are junior in age or social hierarchy. No difference between the singular and the plural; plural reference can, however, be indicated by the use of "you people" (तुम लोग تُم لوگ tum log) or "you all" (तुम सब تُم سب tum sab).
- तू تُو tū [tuː]: Originally, a singular pronoun ("thou"), it is nowadays used exclusively as a T-form, in extremely informal settings: to address own children, very close friends, or in poetic language (either with God or with lovers). When used to others (e.g., strangers), it is considered offensive both in Pakistan and India. For Urdu in particular, tū is considered extremely rude in normal conversation, and is reserved for poetry; some Urdu speakers use this to refer to God.

==== Punjabi ====
- ਆਪ آپ: Used exactly like the Hindustani आप/آپ.
- ਤੁਸੀਂ تُسیں: Just like the Hindustani आप/آپ it is used sometimes in formal contexts for a person higher in social hierarchy.
- ਤੂੰ توں: Punjabi lacks a तुम-تُم/तू-تُو distinction. The speaker must decide whether to use ਤੁਸੀਂ/تُسیں or ਤੂੰ/توں with a person. While तुम/تُم is not considered offensive in most informal social interactions, in Punjabi तुम/تُم doesn't exist so usually ਤੂੰ/توں is considered inappropriate for a person higher in social hierarchy and ਤੁਸੀਂ/تُسیں is used. ਤੁਸੀਂ/تُسیں is also used with strangers.

==== Bengali ====
Bengali has three levels of formality in its pronouns; the most neutral forms of address among closer members of a family are তুমি tumi and তোমরা tomra (plural). These two pronouns are also typically used when speaking to children, or to younger members of the extended family. তুমি tumi is also used when addressing God. When speaking with adults outside the family, or with senior members of the extended family, the pronouns আপনি apni and আপনারা apnara (plural) are used. This is also true in advertisements and public announcements. A third set of pronouns, তুই tui and তোরা tora (plural), is reserved for use between very close friends, and by extension, between relatives who share a bond not unlike a close friendship. It is also used when addressing people presumed to be of "inferior" social status; this latter use is occasionally used when speaking to housemaids, rickshaw-pullers, and other service workers, although this use is considered offensive.

The situations in which these different pronouns can be used vary considerably depending on many social factors. In some families, children may address their parents with আপনি apni and আপনারা apnara, although this is becoming increasingly rare. Some adults alternate between all three pronoun levels when speaking to children, normally choosing তুমি tumi and তোমরা tomra, but also often choosing তুই tui and তোরা tora to indicate closeness. Additionally, Bengalis vary in which pronoun they use when addressing servants in the home; some may use আপনি apni and আপনারা apnara to indicate respect for an adult outside the family, while others may use তুমি tumi and তোমরা tomra to indicate either inclusion into the family or to indicate somewhat less honorable status. Others may even use তুই tui and তোরা tora to indicate inferior status.

=== Iranian languages ===
==== Persian ====
Persian resembles Romance languages like French in that the second person plural pronoun shomā (شما) is used as a polite form of address, whereas to (تو) is used among friends and family.

==== Zaza ====
The second-person plural pronoun in Zaza, şıma is used to address someone in a more polite way, like Persian, instead of the second-person singulars tı and to.

=== Armenian ===
Modern Eastern Armenian has a T–V distinction based on the contrast between an informal second-person singular pronoun and a polite form derived from the second-person plural. In Eastern Armenian, the informal singular pronoun is դու du, while the polite singular is Դուք dukʿ. In Western Armenian, the informal singular is commonly դուն dun, while Դուք is likewise used as the polite form.

The polite form Դուք is historically and grammatically connected with the second-person plural դուք “you”. It is pronounced the same as the plural form, but is normally distinguished in writing by capitalization when it refers politely to one person. The same distinction appears in related case and possessive forms: informal քո kʿo “your” and քեզ kʿez “you” contrast with polite Ձեր dzer “your” and Ձեզ dzez “you”.

Function	Informal singular	Polite singular
nominative “you”	դու du	Դուք dukʿ
genitive / possessive “your”	քո kʿo	Ձեր dzer
dative / accusative “you”	քեզ kʿez	Ձեզ dzez

Like other languages with a plural-based polite pronoun, Armenian uses plural verb agreement with the polite singular. Thus, in Eastern Armenian, informal դու գնում ես du gnum es means “you go”, while polite Դուք գնում եք Dukʿ gnum ekʿ also means “you go”, but with a formal or respectful tone. The same plural agreement appears even when the addressee is a single person.

The distinction is not limited to independent pronouns. It also appears in possessive forms, object forms and imperatives. For example, informal Նստիր Nstir “sit down” contrasts with polite Նստեք Nstekʿ. Similarly, informal Քո անունը ի՞նչ է Kʿo anunə inchʿ e? “What is your name?” contrasts with polite Ձեր անունը ի՞նչ է Dzer anunə inchʿ e?.

In social use, դու is normally used among family members, close friends, peers, children and people who have mutually agreed on familiar address. Դուք is used with strangers, elders, customers, teachers, officials, employers and people of higher social or professional status. The use can also be asymmetrical: for example, an adult may address a child with դու, while the child may be expected to answer with Դուք. Switching from Դուք to դու can mark a move toward familiarity, solidarity or intimacy, while using դու too early with an unfamiliar adult may sound abrupt, condescending or deliberately disrespectful.

Because Armenian is a pro-drop language, the pronoun itself may be omitted when the verb form makes the person clear. Even without the pronoun, however, the T–V distinction may remain visible in the verb: գնում ես gnum es is informal singular, while գնում եք gnum ekʿ may be polite singular or plural depending on context.

The distinction is present in both major modern standards, Eastern Armenian and Western Armenian, although the exact informal singular form differs between them. Eastern Armenian uses դու du, while Western Armenian commonly uses դուն dun. In both standards, the polite form is based on Դուք, with second-person plural agreement.

== Uralic languages ==
=== Finnish ===
In Finnish, today the use of the informal singular form of address (sinä) is widespread in all social circles, even among strangers and in business situations. The use of formal address has not disappeared however, and persists in situations involving customer service (especially if the customer is clearly older than the person serving them) and in general in addressing the elderly or in situations where strict adherence to form is expected, such as in the military. An increase in the use of formal address has been reported in recent years, whereby some people are choosing to use the formal form more often.. As the use of the form conveys formal recognition of the addressee's status and, more correctly, of polite social distance, the formal form might also occasionally be used jeeringly or to protest the addressee's snobbery. A native speaker may also switch to formal form when speaking in anger, as an attempt to remain civil. Advertisements, instructions, and other formal messages are mostly in informal singular form (sinä and its conjugations), but the use of formal forms has increased in recent years. For example, as the tax authorities tend to become more informal, in contrast the social security system is reverting to using the formal form.

The same forms, such as the pronoun te, are used for formal singular and for both formal and informal plural.

In Finnish the number is expressed in pronouns (sinä for second-person singular, or te for second-person plural), verb inflections, and possessive suffixes. Almost all of these elements follow the grammar of the second-person plural also in the formal singular form. For example, polite Voisitteko (te) siirtää autonne vs. informal Voisitko (sinä) siirtää autosi, "Could you move your car, (please)?". Each of the person markers are modified: -t- to -tte- (verb person), sinä to te (pronoun), -si to -nne (possessive suffix).

As a few examples of this could be mentioned the way imperatives are expressed: Menkää! "Go!" (plural), vs. Mene! "Go!" (singular), and the usage of the plural suffix -nne "your" instead of the singular -si "your".

There is number agreement in Finnish, thus you say sinä olet "you are" (singular), but te olette "you are" (plural). However, this does not extend to words describing the addressee, which are in the singular, e.g. oletteko te lääkäri? "are you doctor?" (plural, plural, singular)

A common error, nowadays often made even by native speakers unused to the formal forms, is to use the plural form of the main verb in the perfect and pluperfect constructions. The main verb should be in the singular when addressing one person in the formal plural: Oletteko kuullut? instead of *Oletteko kuulleet? "Have you heard?"

Sometimes the third person is used as a polite form of address, after the Swedish model: Mitä rouvalle saisi olla? "What would madam like to have?" This is far less common in the Eastern parts of Finland, influenced less by the Swedish language and all in all a declining habit. The passive voice may be used to circumvent the choice of the correct form of address. In another meaning, the passive voice is also the equivalent of the English patronizing we as in Kuinkas tänään voidaan? "How are we feeling today?"

Finnish language includes the verbs for calling one with informal singular or formal plural: sinutella, teititellä, respectively.

In the Bible and in the Kalevala, only the "informal" singular is used in all cases.

=== Estonian ===
Estonian is a language with T–V distinction, second-person plural (teie) is used instead of second-person singular (sina) as a means of expressing politeness or formal speech. Sina is the familiar form of address used with family, friends, and minors. The distinction is still much more widely used and more rigid than in closely related Finnish language.

Similar to the French language vouvoyer, the verb teietama is used, and teie is used when addressing a (new) customer or a patient, or when talking to a person in his/her function. In hierarchical organizations, like large businesses or armies, sina is used between members of a same rank/level while teie is used between members of different ranks. Sina (the verb sinatama is also used) is used with relatives, friends, when addressing children, and with close colleagues. Borderline situations, such as distant relatives, young adults, customers in rental shops or new colleagues, sometimes still present difficulties.

=== Hungarian ===
Hungarian provides numerous, often subtle means of T–V distinction:

The use of the second-person conjugation with the pronoun te (plural ti) is the most informal mode. As in many other European languages, it is used within families, among children, lovers, close friends, (nowadays often) among coworkers, and in some communities, suggesting an idea of brotherhood. Adults unilaterally address children this way, and it is the form used in addressing God and other Christian figures (such as Jesus Christ or the Blessed Virgin), animals, and objects or ideas. Sociologically, the use of this form is widening. Whereas traditionally the switch to te is often a symbolic milestone between people, sometimes sealed by drinking a glass of wine together (pertu, cf. Brüderschaft (trinken) in German), today people under the age of about thirty will often mutually adopt te automatically in informal situations. A notable example is the Internet: strangers meeting online often use the informal forms of address, regardless of age or status differences.

Nevertheless, formal forms of address are alive and well in Hungarian:

- The third-person verb conjugation is the primary basis of formal address. The choice of which pronoun to use, however, is fraught with difficulty (and indeed a common solution when in doubt is to simply avoid using any pronoun at all, using the addressee's name or title instead).
  - The pronoun maga (plural maguk), for instance, is considered the basic formal equivalent of "you", but may not be used indiscriminately, as it tends to imply an existing or desired personal acquaintance. (It would not, for instance, ordinarily be used in a conversation where the relative social roles are predominantly important—say, between professor and student.) Typical situations where maga might be used are, e.g., distant relatives, neighbours, fellow travellers on the train, or at the hairdresser's. If one already knows these people, they may even take offence if one were to address them more formally. On the other hand, some urbanites tend to avoid maga, finding it too rural, old-fashioned, offensive or even intimate. Note that maga coincides with the reflexive pronoun (cf. him/herself), so e.g. the sentence Megütötte magát? can have three meanings: "Did he hit himself?", "Did he hit you?" or "Did you hit yourself?".
  - Ön (plural önök) is the formal, official and impersonal "you". It is the form used when people take part in a situation merely as representatives of social roles, where personal acquaintance is not a factor. It is thus used in institutions, business, bureaucracy, advertisements, by broadcasters, by shopkeepers to their customers, and whenever one wishes to maintain one's distance. It is less typical of rural areas or small towns, more typical of cities. It's often capitalized in letters.
  - Other pronouns are nowadays rare, restricted to rural, jocular, dialect, or old-fashioned speech. Such are, for instance, kend and kegyed.
  - There is a wide spectrum of third-person address that avoids the above pronouns entirely; preferring to substitute various combinations of the addressee's names and/or titles. Thus, for instance, a university student might ask mit gondol X. tanár úr? ("What does Professor X. think?", meant for the addressee) rather than using the insufficiently formal maga or the overly impersonal ön. If the difference in rank is not to be emphasized, it is perfectly acceptable to use the addressed person's first name instead of a second-person pronoun, e.g. Megkérném arra Pétert, hogy... ("I'd like to ask [you,] Peter to…"). (Note that these are possible because the formal second-person conjugation of verbs is the same as the third-person conjugation.)
- Finally, the auxiliary verb tetszik (lit. "it pleases [you]") is an indirect alternative (or, perhaps, supplement) to direct address with the third or even second person. In terms of grammar, it can only be applied if the addressed person is mentioned in the nominative, otherwise it is replaced by forms with the name or maga. It is very polite (sometimes seen as over-polite) and not as formal as the Ön form. Children usually address adults outside their family this way. Adults may address more distant relatives, housekeepers and older persons using this form, and some men habitually address older or younger women this way (this is slightly old-fashioned).

It is important to keep in mind that formal conjugation doesn't automatically imply politeness or vice versa; these factors are independent of each other. For example, Mit parancsolsz? "What would you like to have?" (literally, "What do you command?") is in the informal conjugation, while it can be extremely polite, making it possible to express one's honour towards people one has previously established a friendly relationship with. On the other hand, Mit akar? "What do you want?" is expressed with the formal conjugation, nevertheless it may sound rude and aggressive; the formal conjugation does not soften this tone in any way.

	Example: "you" in the nominative "Will you be leaving tomorrow?"		Example: "you" in the accusative "I saw you yesterday on the television."		
Te	(Te) holnap utazol el?		Láttalak tegnap a tévében.		
Maga	(Maga)	holnap utazik el?	Láttam	magát	tegnap a tévében.
Ön	(Ön)	holnap utazik el?	Láttam	önt	tegnap a tévében.
[title or first name]	(A) tanár úr* Péter	holnap utazik el?	Láttam	(a) tanár urat* Pétert	tegnap a tévében.
Tetszik	Holnap tetszik elutazni?		[The name or maga is used instead] Láttam tegnap Mari nénit** a tévében. OR Láttam tegnap magát a tévében.		

* tanár úr is a form of addressing for professors (cf. "Sir"); tanár urat is the accusative. Other forms of addressing are also possible, to avoid specifying the maga and ön pronouns.
** Mari nénit is an example name in the accusative (cf. "Aunt Mary").

== Turkic ==
=== Turkish ===
In modern Turkish, the T–V distinction is strong. Family members and friends speak to one another using the second-person singular sen, and adults use sen to address minors. In formal situations (business, customer–clerk, and colleague relationships, or meeting people for the first time) the plural second-person siz is used almost exclusively. In very formal situations, the double plural second-person sizler may be used to address a much-respected person. Rarely, the third-person plural form of the verb (but not the pronoun) may be used to emphasize utmost respect. Additionally, if there are two or more person siz or sizler could be used. For example, Siz seçildiniz or Sizler seçildiniz have same meaning that "You have been chosen". However, Siz seçildiniz are not certain whether plural or singular. It changes; formal speaking siz specifies one person or more but informal speaking it specifies only two or more person. In the imperative, there are three forms: second-person singular for informal, second-person plural for formal, and second-person double plural for very formal situations: gel (second-person singular, informal), gelin (second-person plural, formal), and geliniz (double second-person plural, very formal). The very formal forms are not frequently used in spoken Turkish, but are pretty common in written directives, such as manuals and warning signs.

=== Uyghur ===
Uyghur is notable for using four different forms, to distinguish both singular and plural in both formal and informal registers. The informal plural silär originated as a contraction of sizlär, which uses a regular plural ending. In Old Turkic, as still in modern Turkish, 𐰾𐰃𐰕 (siz) was the original second-person plural. However, in modern Uyghur سئز (siz) has become restricted to the formal singular, requiring the plural suffix -lär for the plurals.

Siz as the formal singular pronoun is characteristic of the Ürümqi dialect, which is the Uyghur literary standard. In Turpan they say سئلئ (sili) and in Kashgar dialect, özlär. Sili is also used in other areas sometimes, while in literary Uyghur özlär as a singular pronoun is considered a "hyperdeferential" level of respect; the deferential plural form is härqaysiliri.

== Northwest Caucasian ==
=== Ubykh ===
In the extinct Ubykh language, the T–V distinction was most notable between a man and his mother-in-law, where the plural form sʸæghʷa supplanted the singular wæghʷa very frequently, possibly under the influence of Turkish. The distinction was upheld less frequently in other relationships, but did still occur.

== Semitic ==
=== Arabic ===
Modern Standard Arabic uses the majestic plural form of the second person (أنتم antum) in respectful address. It is restricted to highly formal contexts, generally relating to politics and government. However, several varieties of Arabic have a clearer T–V distinction. The most developed is in Egyptian Arabic, which uses حضرتك ḥaḍritak (literally, "Your Grace"), سعادتك sa‘adtak and سيادتك siyadtak (literally, "Your Lordship") as the "V" terms, depending on context, while أنت inta is the "T" term. Ḥaḍritak is the most usual "V" term, with sa‘adtak and siyadtak being reserved for situations where the addressee is of very high social standing (e.g. a high-ranking government official or a powerful businessman). Finally, the "V" term is used only with social superiors (including elders); unfamiliar people perceived to be of similar or lower social standing to the speaker are addressed with the T term inta.

=== Hebrew ===
In modern Hebrew, there is a T–V distinction used in a set of very formal occasions, for example, a lawyer addressing a judge, or when speaking to rabbis. The second-person singular אַתָּה ([ʔaˈta], masculine) or אַתְּ ([ʔat], feminine) are the usual form of address in all other situations, e.g. when addressing ministers or members of the Knesset.

The formal form of address when speaking to a person of higher authority is the third-person singular using the person's title without the use of the pronoun. Thus, a rabbi could be asked: ?כְּבוֹד הָרַב יִרְצֶה לֶאֱכֹל ([kəˈvod haˈʁav yiʁˈtse leʔeˈχol], "would the honorable rabbi like to eat?") or a judge told: כְּבוֹדוֹ דָּן בְּבַקָּשָׁתִי ([kəvoˈdo dan bəvakaʃaˈti], "his honour is considering my request").

Other persons of authority are normally addressed by their title only, rather than by name, using the second-person singular. For example, officers and commanders in the army are addressed as הַמְּפַקֵּד ([haməfaˈked], "the commander") by troops.

In non-Hebrew-speaking Jewish culture, the second-person form of address is similarly avoided in cases of higher authority (e.g., a student in a yeshiva would be far more likely to say in a classroom discussion "yesterday the Rav told us..." than "yesterday you told us..."). However, this usage is limited to more conservative (i.e. Orthodox) circles.

== Dravidian ==
=== Tamil ===
In Tamil, the second-person singular pronoun நீ [niː] and its derived forms are used to address children, (younger or very close) members of the family and to people who are younger than the speaker. The second-person plural pronoun நீங்கள் [niːŋgʌɭ] is used to address elders (also within the extended family), teachers, people who are older than the speaker and anyone whom the speaker does not personally know, especially in formal situations.

However, in Sri Lankan Tamil dialects, the second-person plural pronoun நீங்கள் [niːŋgʌɭ] is used in colloquial situations as well, even towards members of the family and people who are younger than the speaker. The extent to which நீங்கள் is used compared to நீ [niː] or நீர் [niːr] varies by dialect and community, or even by idiolect.

== Sino-Tibetan ==
=== Chinese ===
Chinese culture has taken naming and forms of address very seriously, strictly regulating which people were permitted to use which terms in conversation or in writing. The extreme example is the 1777 execution of Wang Xihou and his entire family and the confiscation of their entire estate as his penalty for writing the Qianlong Emperor's personal name as part of a criticism of the Kangxi Dictionary. Many honorifics and niceties of address fell by the wayside during the Cultural Revolution of the late 1960s amid Mao Zedong's campaign against the "Four Olds". This included an attempt to eradicate expressions of deference to teachers and to others seen as preserving "counter-revolutionary" modes of thought. The defeat of the Maoist Gang of Four in the late 1970s and continuing reform and opening up period since the 1980s has, however, permitted a return of such traditional and regional expressions.

Historically, the T–V distinction was observed among the Chinese by avoiding any use of common pronouns in addressing a respected audience. Instead, third-person honorifics and respectful titles were employed. One aspect of such respectful address was avoiding the use of the first-person pronoun as well, instead choosing a (typically humble) epithet in its place. The extreme of this practice occurred when Shi Huangdi abrogated the then-current first-person pronoun 朕 (zhèn); the present first-person pronoun 我 (wǒ) subsequently developed out of the habit of referring to "this [worthless] body", the character's original meaning. An important difference between the T–V distinction in Chinese compared with modern European languages is that Chinese culture considers the relative age of the speakers an important aspect of their social distance. This is especially strong within families: while the speakers of European languages may generally prefer forms of address such as "father" or "grandpa", Chinese speakers consider using the personal names of elders such a taboo that they may not even know the given names of grandparents who live in the same apartment. While strictures against writing the personal name of any ancestor of the last seven generations are no longer observed, it remains very uncommon to name children for any living relative: younger people using the name freely would disrespect the original bearer.

In the present day, the informal second-person pronoun is 你 (Mandarin: nǐ; Minnan: lí) and the honorific pronoun is 您 (Mandarin: nín; Minnan: lín). Much like European languages, the honorific form developed out of an earlier second-person plural: during the Jin and Yuan dynasties, the Mandarin dialects mutated 你每 (nǐměi) into 你們 (nǐmen) and then into 您. (A similar form – 怹, tān – developed for the third-person singular but is now generally unused. While unseen elsewhere, some Beijing dialects use a further wǎnmen for the first-person plural to include a person worthy of respect, where wǎn is from 我们 wǒmen.)

The T–V distinction in Mandarin does not connote a distance or lack of intimacy between the speakers (as implied, e.g., in the French vous). On the contrary, it is often noted that the respectful form contains the radical for "heart" (心, xīn); although this is actually for phonetic reasons, the implication is that the addressee is loved and cherished by the speaker.

Most southern dialects, however, do not make this distinction in speech at all. Cantonese and Shanghainese speakers learn to write both forms in school but pronounce them identically: the Cantonese as nei^{5} and the Shanghainese as nóng. Formality is still respected, but their languages – like Japanese and Vietnamese – retain the earlier Chinese tradition of employing epithets or honorifics instead of using any pronouns at all when showing formal respect.

== Japonic ==
=== Japanese ===
Under heavy Chinese influence, traditional Japanese culture eschewed the use of common pronouns in formal speech; similarly, the Chinese first-person singular 朕 (ちん, chin) was arrogated to the personal use of the emperor. The formality of Japanese culture was such that its original pronouns have largely ceased to be used at all. Some linguists therefore argue that Japanese lacks any pronouns whatsoever, but – although it is a larger and more complex group of words than most languages employ – Japanese pronouns do exist, having developed out of the most common epithets used to express different relationships and relative degrees of social status. As in Korean, polite language encompasses not only these specific pronouns but also suffixes and vocabulary as well.

Most commonly, 君 (きみ, kimi, orig. "prince", "lord") is used informally as the second-person singular and 貴方 (あなた, anata, lit. "dear one") is the most common polite equivalent, but is also commonly used by women towards an intimate as a term of endearment. The pronoun 貴様 (きさま, kisama) is illustrative of the complexity that can be involved, though, in that its literal meaning is quite flattering – lit. "dear and honorable sir" – but its ironic use has made it a strong insult in modern Japanese. Similarly, 御前 (おまえ, omae) – lit. "(one who is) before (me)" – was traditionally a respectful pronoun used toward aristocrats and religious figureheads, but today is considered very informal and impolite, yet also commonly used by husbands towards their wives in an endearing manner.

== Austro-Asiatic ==
=== Vietnamese ===
Under heavy Chinese influence, Vietnamese culture has eschewed the use of common pronouns in formal speech; similarly, the Chinese first-person singular 朕 (Vietnamese: trẫm) was arrogated to the personal use of the emperor.

In modern Vietnamese, only the first-person singular tôi is in common use as a respectful pronoun; any other pronoun should be replaced with the subject's name or with an appropriate epithet, title, or relationship in polite formal speech. Similar to modern Chinese (but to a much greater extent), modern Vietnamese also frequently replaces informal pronouns with kinship terms in many situations. The somewhat insulting second-person singular mày is also frequently used in informal situations among young Vietnamese.

== Kra–Dai languages ==
=== Thai ===
In Thai, first-, second-, and third-person pronouns vary in formality according to the social standing of the speaker and the referent and the relationship between them.

== Austronesian ==
=== Indonesian ===
In Indonesian, the T–V distinction is extremely important; addressing a stranger with the pronoun kau or kamu (you) is considered rude and impolite (unless the stranger is, for example, a child). When addressing a stranger or someone older, typically Bu ('ma'am') or Pak ('sir') is used. People also use mas (Javanese for 'older brother') or mbak (Javanese for 'older sister') when addressing someone that is not old enough to be called Bu or Pak. There are variations in different areas. If the situation is more formal, such as in meetings or news broadcasting, Anda is always used, even if those addressed would otherwise be addressed by kau or kamu in informal situations.
A more informal pronoun, written lu, lo, or sometimes as loe (originated from Hokkien language) is considered very impolite. This is normally used around the capital Jakarta, as in other areas the use of loe is still perceived as rather unusual or as an attempt to imitate Jakartans. Loe is generally used by teenagers to their peers. Adults can sometimes be heard using this pronoun with their close friends or when they are angry.

1. Lu siap? ('Are you ready?'): This form is used between friends in very informal situations without the presence of someone who has higher status.
2. Kamu siap? ('Are you ready?'): This form is used between friends in either informal or formal situations without the presence of someone who has higher status.
3. Anda siap? ('Are you ready?'): This form is used between friends in formal situations, between business partners, or with someone who has higher status.
4. Apakah Anda siap? (Are you ready?): This form is used between friends in very formal situations, among strangers, or toward someone who has higher status. Apakah is an optional question word that is used in close-ended questions (similar to the use of 'to be' and other auxiliary verbs to form close-ended questions in English). This is a form of Bahasa Baku, i.e. formal standard language.

Similarly, kalian and Anda/Anda sekalian are used.

The pronoun kamu in Indonesian was originally used for plural, but has shifted to be used in singular today. The modern form of plural you is kalian, which is a shortened form of "kamu sekalian" (sekalian meaning 'all at once').
This mirrors the development of the use of you in English, which replaced thee/thou, and in which certain modern varieties developed a form for second-person plural, notable examples would be y'all, you guys, and youse.
Unlike in English, where thee/thou is no longer used, in Indonesian the original pronoun for singular, kau or engkau, isn't completely supplanted by kamu.
This is similar to the situation in some Latin American countries, where tu and vos (originally plural. cf. tu vs voi/vous in Romanian, Italian, and French.) exist side by side.

=== Tagalog ===
In Tagalog, the familiar second person is ikáw/ka (in the nominative case). This is replaced by kayó (which is actually the second-person plural) when the situation calls for a more polite tone. The pronoun kayó is accompanied by the particle pô. This form is generally used to show respect to close, older relatives. This is also the form expected when talking with the peers of parents or grandparents.

Traditionally, when a higher degree of formality is required, the third-person plural (silá) is used instead. It is used when addressing people of higher social rank, such as government officials and senior clergymen. It may also be used when speaking to complete strangers as a matter of courtesy, such as when answering the door or an unknown caller.

1. Sino ka? (Who are you?) [Used to ask for the identity of a peer or one of equal social rank, such as a student to a fellow student. Depending on intonation, this question may sound rough and impolite.]
2. Sino pô kayó? (Who are you?) [This form implies that the speaker believes the person addressed is a relative or an individual of a higher rank, and is thus used to confirm the relationship.]
3. Sino pô silá? (Who are you, Sir/Ma'am?) [Though 'pô' does not really translate as 'Sir' or 'Ma'am', this form implies that the person being addressed is a complete stranger, and the speaker has no idea who they are and thus assumes they are of higher rank out of respect.]

Younger Filipinos tend to mix these forms of address, resulting in questions such as Sino ka pô ba? in an attempt to sound polite towards a total stranger. This and other nonstandard variants are very widespread, especially in the Manila dialect of Tagalog and its surrounding suburbs.

== Other languages ==
=== Basque ===
Basque has two levels of formality in every dialect, which are hi and zu, but in some areas of Gipuzkoa and Biscay, the respectful form berori is still used by some speakers, just as the familiar xu in some areas of the Eastern Low Navarrese dialect, when addressing children and close friends. Most speakers only use the zu form (zuka level) and that is the usual one used in methods, slogans... although the hi form (hika) is very common in villages.

The neutral or formal one is zu, which originally used to be the plural form of the second person. The informal one is hi, whose use is limited to some specific situations: among close friends, to children (children never use it when addressing their parents, neither the spouses among them), when talking to a younger person, to animals (cattle, pets...), in monologues, and when speaking angrily to somebody. Their common plural form is zuek, whenever the speaker is talking to a group of listeners who would all be individually addressed with the form zu, or the form hi, or both (a conversation where some listeners are addressed as zu—i.e., somebody's parents, for instance—and others as hi—the speaker's siblings).

Unlike zu, hi sometimes makes a distinction whether the addressed one is a male or a female. For example: duk (thou, male, hast) and dun (thou, female, hast). The use of the hika level requires the allocutive agreement (hitano or zeharkako hika, i.e., indirect hika) in non-subordinate sentences to mark this distinction for the first- and third-person verbs. Those allocutive forms are found in the indicative and conditional moods, but never in the subjunctive and imperative moods, with the one exception of goazemak (let's go, said to a male) and goazeman (said to a female) in Western dialects, opposed to goazen, the neutral form. For example:

- du (neutral, s/he has, neutral form), dik (s/he has, male thou) and din (s/he has, female thou), as in aitak ikasi du (polite: Dad has learned it), aitak ikasi dik (informal, said to a male), and aitak ikasi din (informal, said to a female).
- dio (neutral, s/he has it for him / her), ziok (familiar, s/he has it for him / her, said to a male), and zion (familiar, s/he has it for him / her, said to a female), as in aitak erosi dio (polite: Dad has bought it for him / her), aitak erosi ziok (informal, said to a male), and aitak erosi zion (informal, said to a female).
- nintzen (neutral, I was), ninduan (familiar, said to a male), and nindunan (familiar, said to a female), as in hona etorri nintzen (polite: I came here), hona etorri ninduan (informal, said to a male), and hona etorri nindunan (informal, said to a female).

Nevertheless, if any of the allocutive sentences becomes subordinate, the formal one is used: aitak ikasi duelako (because dad has learned it), aitak erosi diolako (because dad bought it for him / her), and hona etorri nintzenean (when I came here).

On the other hand, in past tense verbal forms, no distinction is made when the addressee is the subject or the direct object in the sentence. For example:

- hintzen, in etxera joan hintzen (thou wentst home),
- huen, in filma ikusi huen (thou sawst the film),
- hindugun, in ikusi hindugun (we saw thee).

But if the familiar second-person appears in the verb, or if the verb is an allocutive form in a non-dependent clause, the masculine and feminine forms differ. For example:

- genian / geninan (we had something for thee, male / female): hiri eman genian, Piarres (we gave it to thee, Peter), and hiri eman geninan, Maddi (we gave it to thee, Mary).
- geniean / genienan (male allocutive / female allocutive, we had something for them): haiei eman geniean, Piarres (we gave it to them, Peter), and haiei eman genienan, Maddi (we gave it to them, Mary). Their corresponding neutral form is haiei eman genien.
- banekian erantzuna (I knew the answer, said to a male), and banekinan erantzuna (I knew the answer, said to a female). Their corresponding neutral form is banekien erantzuna.

The friendly xu form or xuketa resembles the zuka forms of the verbs, and includes another kind of allocutive, as hika: cf. egia erran dut (formal: I told the truth), egia erran diat (informal, said to a male), egia erran dinat (informal, said to a female), egia erran dautzut (in formal Eastern Low Navarrese, I told you the truth) and egia erran dixut (xuketa). It is mainly used among relatives and close friends.

The berori form or berorika is very formal, and hardly used nowadays, mainly in some areas of Biscay and Gipuzkoa, to address priests, the elderly, judges, and the nobility. Verbs are inflected in their singular third form, like in Italian ((Lei) è molto gentile, opposed to (tu) sei molto gentile, you are very nice / thou art very nice) or the Spanish (usted) es muy amable, opposed to (tú) eres muy amable:

- neutral: zuk badakizu hori (you know it, formal), and zu, eser zaitez hemen (you, sit here),
- familiar: hik badakik hori (thou knowest that, said to a male), hik badakin hori (to a female), and hi, eser hadi hemen (sit here, for both genders),
- very formal: berorrek badaki hori (you know that: cf. hark badaki hori, s/he knows that, neutral), and berori, eser bedi hemen (you, sit down here: cf hura, eser bedi hemen, let him sit down here).

Unlike the hika level, berorika has no allocutive forms.

The extinct dialect of Erronkari or Roncal, spoken in the easternmost area of Navarre, presented a four-levelled system:

- neutral or zuketza, the local equivalent of zuka: etxeara xuan zra (you went home, you have gone home), etxeara xuan naz (I went home, I have gone home),
- informal or yiketza, which corresponds to hika: etxeara xuan yaz, (thou wentst home, thou hast gone home), etxeara xuan nuk / etxeara xuan nun (I went home, I have been home, said to a male / to a female),
- familiar or tzuketza, like the Eastern Navarrese xuka: etxeara xuan nuzu (I went home, I have been home),
- and orika, duka or duketza, the local form of berorika: ori etxeara xin da (you went home, you have been home).

== Constructed languages ==
=== Esperanto ===
Esperanto is a T–V-distinguishing language, but usually vi is used for both singular and plural, just like you in modern English. An informal second-person singular pronoun, ci, indeed exists, but it is seldom used in practice. It is intended mainly to mark the familiar/respectful distinction when translating literature from languages with the T–V distinction into Esperanto.

Some have imagined ci as an archaic term that was used before and then fell out of common usage; however, this is not true. It has appeared only sometimes in experimental language. In standard Esperanto, vi has always been used since the beginning. For example, ci appears in neither the Fundamenta Gramatiko nor the Unua Libro. But, especially in some circles, people have begun to use ci in practical language, mainly as the familiar and intimate singular, reserving vi for the plural and formal singular. Others use ci as singular and vi as plural regardless of formality.

=== Ido ===
In Ido, in theory tu is limited to friends and family, whereas vu is used anywhere else. However, many users actually adapt the practice in their own mother tongue and use tu and vu accordingly. In the plural, though, the only form in use is vi, which does not distinguish between formal and informal address.

In all cases, an -n is added to the original pronoun to indicate a direct object that precedes its own verb: Me amoras tu (I love you) becomes Tun me amoras if the direct object takes the first place, for example for emphatic purposes.

=== Láadan ===
In Láadan, formality is specifiable lexically. For example, a parent can be referred to as mathul or the formal shathul; yet more informal is emath, only used in pet name contexts.

=== Tolkien's High Elvish ===
In High Elvish, self-named Quenya, there is a distinction between singular informal tyë and singular formal lyë. The plural of both forms is lë. The formal form is expected between all but family members and close friends. The appendices to The Lord of the Rings state that Westron followed a similar pattern, although the dialect of Shire had largely lost the formal form.

=== Klingon ===
The Klingon language does not have a T-V distinction, with the second-person pronouns SoH (singular) and tlhIH (plural) and their appropriate conjugating verb prefixes covering all forms of address. However, Klingon does employ a number of honorifics, such as qaH (Sir or Madam) or joHwI' (my lord or my lady) to express formality. An honorific verb suffix -neS exists, used to express extreme politeness or deference towards a superior in a social or military hierarchy. It is rarely employed and never required.
