= Bror Rexed =

Swedish neuroscientist (1914–2002)

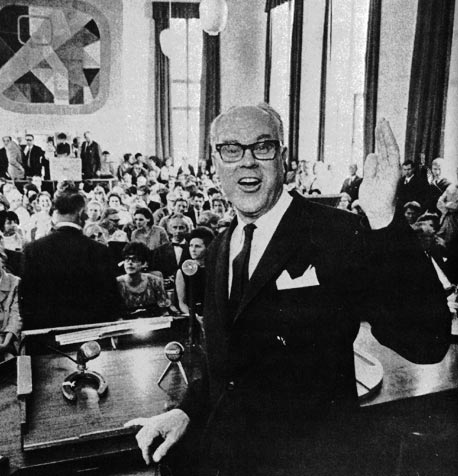
- Born: Bror Anders Rexed; 19 June 1914; Räxed, Sweden
- Died: 21 August 2002 (aged 88); Helsinki, Finland
- Occupation: Neuroscientist
- Known for: Du-reformen

Bror Anders Rexed (19 June 1914 – 21 August 2002) was a Swedish neuroscientist and professor at Uppsala University. Internationally, he is best known today for his development of the system now known as Rexed laminae, but in Sweden, he is also known for his involvement in the "du-reformen" of the Swedish language during the late 1960s.

In 1980, he was awarded the Léon Bernard Foundation Prize.

== Early life and education ==
Bror Anders Rexed grew up on a small farm in Räxed, Värmland, and entered Uppsala University in 1933. After completing his medical licence (1942) he combined clinical work at Akademiska sjukhuset with neuro-anatomical research, earning a PhD in 1950 for a thesis on the cellular architecture of the cat spinal cord.

== Neuroscience career ==
Between 1952 and 1960 Rexed published a four-part series that subdivided the spinal grey matter into ten cytoarchitectonic layers, now universally known as the Rexed laminae. By relating sensory and motor pathways to these laminae he provided a structural basis for modern pain and reflex circuitry models, and his maps have since been confirmed in more than 100 vertebrate species. Appointed professor of anatomy at Uppsala in 1966, he introduced transmission electron microscopy to the department and supervised Sweden's first study of synaptic ultrastructure in the dorsal horn.

== Public health and language reform ==
In 1967 the government asked Rexed to act as director general of the newly created National Swedish Board of Health and Welfare. Although his tenure lasted only sixteen months, it proved influential: during a televised staff address he dropped all titles and addressed every employee simply as du ("you"), a gesture widely credited with triggering the nationwide du-reform that swept away Sweden's rigid hierarchy of honorifics. After returning to academia he served on WHO's Executive Board and, in 1980, received the organisation's Léon Bernard Foundation Prize for contributions to international health administration.

Government offices
Preceded by Arthur Engel	Director General of the National Swedish Board of Health; 1967–1968	Succeeded by None
