= T–V distinction =

Formality distinction feature of some languages

The T–V distinction is the contextual use of different pronouns that exists in some languages and serves to convey formality or familiarity. Its name comes from the Latin pronouns tu and vos. The distinction takes a number of forms and indicates varying levels of politeness, familiarity, courtesy, age, or even insult toward the addressee. The field that studies and describes this phenomenon is sociolinguistics.

Many languages lack this type of distinction, instead relying on other morphological or discourse features to convey formality. English historically contained the distinction, using the pronouns thou and you, but the familiar thou largely disappeared from the era of Early Modern English onward, with the exception of a few dialects. Additionally, British commoners historically spoke to nobility and royalty using the third person rather than the second person, a practice that has fallen out of favour. English speakers today often employ semantic analogues to convey the mentioned attitudes towards the addressee, such as whether to address someone by given name or surname or whether to use sir or madam. Under a broader classification, T and V forms are examples of honorifics.

The T–V distinction is expressed in a variety of forms; two particularly common means are:

- addressing a single individual using the second-person plural forms in the language, instead of the singular (e.g. in French);
- addressing individuals with another pronoun with its own verb conjugations (e.g. in Spanish).

== Origin and development ==
The terms T and V, based on the Latin pronouns tu and vos, were first used in a paper by the social psychologist Roger Brown and the Shakespearean scholar Albert Gilman. This was a historical and contemporary survey of the uses of pronouns of address, seen as semantic markers of social relationships between individuals. The study considered mainly French, Italian, Spanish and German. The paper was highly influential and, with few exceptions, the terms T and V have been used in subsequent studies.

The status of the single second-person pronoun you in English is controversial among linguistic scholars. For some, the English you keeps everybody at a distance, although not to the same extent as V pronouns in other languages. For others, you is a default neutral pronoun that fulfils the functions of both T and V without being the equivalent of either, so an N-V-T framework is needed, where N indicates neutrality.

== History and usage in language ==
In classical Latin, tu was originally the singular, and vos the plural, with no distinction for honorific or familiar. According to Brown and Gilman, the Roman emperors began to be addressed as vos in the 4th century AD. They mention the possibility that this was because there were two emperors at that time (in Constantinople and in Rome), but also mention that "plurality is a very old and ubiquitous metaphor for power." This usage was extended to other powerful figures, such as Pope Gregory I (590–604). However, Brown and Gilman note that it was only between the 12th and 14th centuries that the norms for the use of T- and V-forms crystallized. Less commonly, the use of the plural may be extended to other grammatical persons, such as the "royal we" (majestic plural) in English.

Brown and Gilman argued that the choice of form is governed by either relationships of "power" or "solidarity," depending on the culture of the speakers, showing that "power" had been the dominant predictor of form in Europe until the 20th century. Thus, it was quite normal for a powerful person to use a T-form but expect a V-form in return. However, in the 20th century the dynamic shifted in favour of solidarity, so that people would use T-forms with those they knew, and V-forms in service encounters, with reciprocal usage being the norm in both cases.

=== Early history: the power semantic ===
In the Early Middle Ages (the 5th century to the 10th century), the pronoun vos was used to address the most exalted figures, emperors and popes, who would use the pronoun tu to address a subject. This use was progressively extended to other states and societies, and down the social hierarchy as a mark of respect to individuals of higher rank, religious authority, greater wealth, or seniority within a family. The development was slow and erratic, but a consistent pattern of use is estimated to have been reached in different European societies by the period 1100 to 1500. Use of V spread to upper-class individuals of equal rank, but not to lower class individuals. This may be represented in Brown and Gilman's notation:

Unequal power			Equal power	
Emperor	Parent	Husband	High-class friend	Low-class friend
T↓ ↑V			↓↑V	T↓↑
Subject	Child	Wife	High-class friend	Low-class friend

=== Modification: the solidarity semantic ===
Speakers developed greater flexibility of pronoun use by redefining relationships between individuals. Instead of defining the father–son relationship as one of power, it could be seen as a shared family relationship. Brown and Gilman term this the semantics of solidarity. Thus a speaker might have a choice of pronoun, depending on how they perceived the relationship with the person addressed. Thus a speaker with superior power might choose V to express fellow feeling with a subordinate. For example, a restaurant customer might use V to their favourite waiter. Similarly, a subordinate with a friendly relationship of long standing might use T. For example, a child might use T to express affection for their parent.

This may be represented as:

Superior has choice				Subordinate has choice		
Customer	Officer	Employer	Husband	Parent	Elder sibling	Husband
T↓V ↑V				T↓ T↑V		
Waiter	Soldier	Employee	Wife	Child	Younger sibling	Wife

These choices were available not only to reflect permanent relationships, but to express momentary changes of attitude. This allowed playwrights such as Racine, Molière, Ben Jonson, Christopher Marlowe and William Shakespeare to express a character's inner changes of mood through outward changes of pronoun.

For centuries, it was the more powerful individual who chose to address a subordinate either with T or with V, or to allow the subordinate to choose. For this reason, the pronouns were traditionally defined as the "pronoun of either condescension or intimacy" (T) and "the pronoun of reverence or formality" (V). Brown and Gilman argue that modern usage no longer supports these definitions.

=== Modern history ===
Developments from the 19th century have seen the solidarity semantic applied more consistently. It has become less acceptable for a more powerful individual to exercise the choice of pronoun. Officers in most armies are not permitted to address a soldier as T. Most European parents cannot oblige their children to use V. The relationships illustrated above have changed in the direction of the following norms:

Superior choice removed				Subordinate choice removed		
Customer	Officer	Employer	Husband	Parent	Elder sibling	Husband
↑↓V				T↑↓		
Waiter	Soldier	Employee	Wife	Child	Younger sibling	Wife

The tendency to promote the solidarity semantic may lead to the abolition of any choice of address pronoun. During the French Revolution, attempts were made to abolish V. In 17th century England, the Society of Friends obliged its members to use only T to everyone, and some continue to use T (thee) to one another. In most dialects of Modern English however, you, which was originally the V form, has lost this distinction. You is universally used and the pronoun thee is not only considered archaic, but also not commonly understood to be supposedly less formal.

=== Changes in progress ===
It was reported in 2012 that use of the French vous and the Spanish usted are in decline in social media. An explanation offered was that such online communications favour the philosophy of social equality, regardless of usual formal distinctions. Similar tendencies were observed in German, Persian, Chinese, Italian, and Estonian.

=== History of use in individual languages ===
==== English ====
The Old English and Early Middle English second person pronouns thou and ye (with variants) were used for singular and plural reference respectively with no T–V distinction. The earliest entry in the Oxford English Dictionary for ye as a V pronoun in place of the singular thou exists in a Middle English text of 1225 composed in 1200. The usage may have started among the Norman French nobility in imitation of Old French. It made noticeable advances during the second half of the 13th century. During the 16th century, the distinction between the subject form ye and the object form you was largely lost, leaving you as the usual V pronoun (and plural pronoun). After 1600, the use of ye in standard English outside of regional dialects was confined to literary and religious contexts or as a consciously archaic usage.

David Crystal summarises Early Modern English usage thus:

V would normally be used

- by people of lower social status to those above them
- by the upper classes when talking to each other, even if they were closely related
- as a sign of a change (contrasting with thou) in the emotional temperature of an interaction

T would normally be used

- by people of higher social status to those below them
- by the lower classes when talking to each other
- in addressing God or Jesus
- in talking to ghosts, witches, and other supernatural beings
- in an imaginary address to someone who was absent
- as a sign of a change (contrasting with you) in the emotional temperature of an interaction

The T–V distinction was still well preserved when Shakespeare began writing at the end of the 16th century. However, other playwrights of the time made less use of T–V contrasts than Shakespeare. The infrequent use of T in popular writing earlier in the century such as the Paston Letters suggest that the distinction was already disappearing from gentle speech. In the first half of the 17th century, thou disappeared from Standard English, although the T–V distinction was preserved in many regional dialects. When the Quakers began using thou again in the middle of the century, many people were still aware of the old T–V distinction and responded with derision and physical violence.

In the 19th century, one aspect of the T–V distinction was restored to some English dialects in the form of a pronoun that expressed friendly solidarity, written as y'all. Unlike earlier thou, it was used primarily for plural address, and in some dialects for singular address as well. The pronoun was first observed in the southern states of the USA, although its precise origin is obscure. The pronoun spread rapidly throughout the southern states, and (to a lesser extent) other regions of the USA and beyond. This pronoun is not universally accepted, and may be regarded as either nonstandard or a regionalism.

Yous(e) (pron. /juːz/, /jəz/) as a plural is found mainly in (Northern) England, Scotland, parts of Ireland, Australia, New Zealand, South Africa, northern Nova Scotia and parts of Ontario in Canada and parts of the northeastern United States (especially areas where there was historically Irish or Italian immigration), including in Boston, Philadelphia, New York, and scattered throughout working-class communities in the American Rust Belt.

==== French ====
In Old French texts, the pronouns tu and vous are often used interchangeably to address an individual, sometimes in the same sentence. However, some emerging pattern of use has been detected by recent scholars. Between characters equal in age or rank, vous was more common than tu as a singular address. However, tu was sometimes used to put a young man in his place, or to express temporary anger. There may also have been variation between Parisian use and that of other regions.

In the Middle French period, a relatively stable T–V distinction emerged. Vous was the V form used by upper-class speakers to address one another, while tu was the T form used among lower class speakers. Upper-class speakers could choose to use either T or V when addressing an inferior. Inferiors would normally use V to a superior. However, there was much variation; in 1596, Étienne Pasquier observed in his comprehensive survey Recherches de la France that the French sometimes used vous to inferiors as well as to superiors "selon la facilité de nos naturels" ("according to our natural tendencies"). In poetry, tu was often used to address kings or to speak to God.

==== German ====
In German, Du is only used as an informal pronoun. It is only addressed to persons that one knows well, like family members and friends. It is also most commonly used among peers as a sign of equality, especially among young people. In formal situations with strangers and acquaintances, Sie is used instead. "Ihr" was also used in formal situations; this was once the abundant usage, but it has fallen out of use besides certain dialects like Bernese German. In the plural form, "ihr" is used as the "T" pronoun and "Sie" is used as the "V" pronoun; "Ihr" and "Sie" are capitalized when they are used as the "V" pronoun.

==== Nordic languages ====
A T–V distinction was once widespread in the North Germanic languages but its use began rapidly declining in the second half of the 20th century, coinciding with the 1960s youth rebellion. The V variant has in practice completely disappeared from regular speech in Swedish spoken in Sweden, Norwegian and Icelandic. In Faroese and Finland Swedish, however, it is still occasionally used.

The use of the V variant in Danish has declined dramatically, but as of 2023 not completely disappeared. In Danish the T variant is "du" and the V variant is a capitalized "De".

Swedish had both a V-variant of "you" and an even more formal manner of addressing people, which was to address them in the third person ("Could I ask Mr. Johnson to...").

==== Hindustani (Hindi-Urdu) ====
Hindustani (Hindi-Urdu) have three levels of formality distinction. The pronoun तू/تو (tū) is the informal (intimate) pronoun, तुम/تم (tum) is the familiar pronoun, and आप/آپ (āp) is the formal pronoun. Tū is used only in certain contexts; in normal conversation, its use is considered very rude. The pronoun tū is grammatically singular, while the pronouns tum and āp are grammatically plural. However, the plural pronouns are more commonly used as singular pronouns, and to explicitly mark the plurality, words such as लोग/لوگ (log, "people"), सब/سب (sab, "all"), दोनों/دونوں (dōnō̃, "both"), तीनों/تینوں (tīnō̃, "all three"), etc. are added after the plural pronouns.

In the Western Hindi dialects, a fourth level of formality (semi-formal), intermediate between āp and tum, is formed when the pronoun āp is used with the conjugations of tum (i.e., āp-tum). However, this form is strictly dialectal and is neither used in standard registers of Hindustani (both Hindi as well as Urdu), nor in the Eastern Hindi dialects.

=== Use of names ===
The boundaries between formal and informal language differ from language to language, as well as within social groups of the speakers of a given language. In some circumstances, it is not unusual to call other people by first name and the respectful form, or last name and familiar form. For example, German teachers used to use the former construct with upper-secondary students, while Italian teachers typically use the latter (switching to a full V-form with university students). This can lead to constructions denoting an intermediate level of formality in T–V-distinct languages that sound awkward to English-speakers. In Italian, (Signor) Vincenzo Rossi can be addressed with the tu (familiar) form or the Lei (formal) one, but complete addresses range from Tu, Vincenzo (peer to peer or family) and Tu, Rossi (teacher to high-school student, as stated above) to Lei, signor Vincenzo (live-in servant to master or master's son) and Lei, Rossi (senior staff member to junior) and Lei, signor Rossi (among peers and to seniors).

== Usage in language ==
=== Singular, plural and other ways of distinction ===
In many languages, the respectful singular pronoun derives from a plural form. Some Romance languages have familiar forms derived from the Latin singular tu and respectful forms derived from Latin plural vos, sometimes via a circuitous route. Sometimes, a singular V-form derives from a third-person pronoun; in German and some Nordic languages, it is the third-person plural. Some languages have separate T and V forms for both singular and plural, others have the same form and others have a T–V distinction only in the singular.

Different languages distinguish pronoun uses in different ways. Even within languages, there are differences between groups (older people and people of higher status tending both to use and to expect more respectful language) and between various aspects of one language. For example, in Dutch, the V form u is slowly falling into disuse in the plural and so one could sometimes address a group as T form jullie, which clearly expresses the plural when one would address each member individually as u, which has the disadvantage of being ambiguous. In Latin American Spanish, the opposite change has occurred—having lost the T form vosotros, Latin Americans address all groups as ustedes, even if the group is composed of friends whom they would call tú or vos (both T forms). In Standard Peninsular Spanish, however, vosotros (literally "you others") is still regularly used in informal conversation. In some cases, the V-form is likely to be capitalized when it is written.

==== Nominative case ====
The following is a table of the nominative case of the singular and plural second person in many languages, including their respectful variants (if any):

Language	second-person singular familiar	second-person singular respectful	second-person plural familiar	second-person plural respectful
Afrikaans	jy jou	u	julle	u
Albanian	ti	ju	ju	ju
Amharic	አንተ (antä, m) አንቺ (anči, f)	እስዎ (ɨsswo) or እርስዎ (ɨrswo)	እናንተ (ɨnnantä)	እስዎ (ɨsswo) or እርስዎ (ɨrswo)
Arabic (Standard)	أنتَ (ʔanta, m) أنتِ (ʔanti, f)	أَنْتُم (ʔantum, m) أَنْتُنَّ (ʔantunna, f)		
Aragonese	tu	vusté vos (Ansó dialect)	vusatros vusaltros (regional) vusotros (regional)	vustés vos (Ansó dialect)
Armenian	դու (du, east) դուն (tun, west)	դուք (duk, east) դուք (tuk, west)		
Assamese	তই (toi; informal) তুমি (tumi; familiar)	আপুনি (apuni)	তহঁত (tohõt; informal) তোমালোক (tümalük; familiar)	আপোনালোক (apünalük)
Azerbaijani (Azeri)	sən	siz	siz	siz sizlər
Basque	hi (intimate) zu (standard)	zu (standard) berori (very respectful; declining in use, only in Western & Central dialects)	zuek	
Belarusian	ты (ty)	Bы (Vy)	вы (vy)	вы (vy)
Bengali	তুই (tui; very informal) তুমি (tumi)	আপনি (apni)	তোরা (tora; very informal) তোমরা (tomra)	আপনারা (apnara)
Bodo	नों (nwng)	नोंथां (nwngtang)	नोंसोर (nwngswr)	नोंथांसोर (nwngtangswr)
Breton	te	c'hwi	c'hwi	c'hwi
Bulgarian	ти (ti)	Вие (Vie)	вие (vie)	вие (vie)
Catalan	tu	vostè (formal) vós (respectful)	vosaltres	vostès (formal) vosaltres
Mandarin Chinese (Modern)	你 (nǐ)	您 (nín)	s 你们 nǐmen t 你們	various
Czech	ty	Vy	vy	vy
Danish	du	De (increasingly uncommon, very rarely used)	I	De (increasingly uncommon)
Dutch	jij je	u	jullie	u
Early Modern English	thou (nom) thee (obj)	ye (nom) you (obj)		
Late Modern English	you	you	you	you
Estonian	sina sa	teie te		
Faroese	tú	tygum	tit	
Finnish	sinä	te (uncommon)	te	
French	tu	vous il/elle (show deference)	vous	vous ils/elles (show deference)
Frisian (west)	dû	jo	jimme	
Scottish Gaelic	thu / thusa (emphatic)	sibh / sibhse (emphatic)		
Galician	ti (tu, eastern dialect)	vostede	vós (vosoutros, northeastern dialect)	vostedes
Georgian	შენ (shen)	თქვენ (tkven)		
German	du	Sie; Ihr (archaic or dialectal) Er/Sie/Es (archaic or dialectal)	ihr	Sie Ihr (archaic or dialectal)
Modern Greek	εσύ (esí)	εσείς (esís)		
Gujarati	તું (tu)	તમે (tame)	તમે લોકો (tame loko)	
Hindi	तू (tū, intimate or frozen or vulgar) तुम (tum, casual or familiar) आप (āp, consultative or respectful or cultured, dialectal)	आप (āp)	तुम (tum, intimate or casual or rude) आप (āp, consultative or respectful or cultured, dialectal)	आप (āp)
Hungarian	te	maga (a bit old-fashioned, can be impolite) ön (formal and official)	ti	maguk (a bit old-fashioned, can be impolite) önök (formal and official)
Icelandic	þú	þér (very uncommon)	þið	þér (very uncommon)
Indonesian	kamu (more familiar) kau	Anda	kalian	Anda; Anda sekalian (less common)
Italian	tu	Lei; Voi (arch or dial)	voi	Loro (increasingly uncommon)
Javanese	ꦏꦺꦴꦮꦺ (kowé) ꦲꦮꦏ꧀ꦩꦸ (awakmu)	ꦥꦚ꧀ꦗꦼꦤꦼꦔꦤ꧀ (panjenengan) ꦱꦩ꧀ꦥꦺꦪꦤ꧀ (sampéyan)	ꦏꦺꦴꦮꦺꦏꦧꦺꦃ (kowé kabèh)	ꦥꦚ꧀ꦗꦼꦤꦼꦔꦤ꧀ꦰꦼꦢꦤ꧀ꦠꦼꦤ꧀ (panjenengan sedanten)
Kannada	ನೀನು (niinnu)	ನೀವು (niivu)		
Kashmiri	ژٕ (tsü)	تۆہؠ (toh') تُہؠ (tuh')		
Kazakh	сен (sen)	сіз (siz)	сендер (sender)	сіздер (sizder)
Korean	너 (neo)	– (directly addressing a person); 당신 (dangsin) (addressing anonymous readers)	너희 (neohui)	– (여러분 yeoreobun)
Ekoka !Kung	a	i!a	i!a	i!a
Kurmanji (N. Kurdish)	تو (tu)	هون (hûn) هنگۆ (hingo) تو (tu)	هون (hûn) هنگۆ (hingo)	
Sorani (S. Kurdish)	تۆ (to)	ێوه (êwe) تۆ (to)	ێوه (êwe)	
Kyrgyz	сен (sen)	сиз (siz)	силер (siler)	сиздер (sizder)
Ladino	טו tú	בֿוס vos	בֿוזוטרוס vozótros	
Latvian	tu	jūs		
Lithuanian	tu	jūs		
Lombard	ti	vü lüü (m) lée (f)	viòltar	viòltar vü lur
Luxembourgish	du	Dir	dir	
Malay	kamu (standard), awak (regional; common spoken short form is engkau informal), hang (northern dialect, but understood and accepted across Peninsular Malaysia), kau (impolite in all contexts except in very close relationships, e.g. friends [but not acquaintances])	anda (polite/friendly formal; found in formal documents and in all formal contexts, e.g. advertisements. Anda seldom occurs in spoken Malay; instead, most Malaysians would address a respected person by their title or name), kamu (unfriendly formal; also found in formal documents and in all formal contexts, where the intention is to convey a forceful tone in writing—often seen in lawsuits and summonses).	kamu semua (polite/friendly formal), kau orang (when pronounced as ko'rang [used in very close relationships, equivalent to "you all" in parts of the U.S.A.] is slang and more informal), hangpa (northern dialect), kalian (archaic)	anda, kalian (archaic)
Malayalam	നീ	താങ്കൾ	നിങ്ങൾ	
Macedonian	ти (ti)	Вие (Vie)	вие (vie)	
Marathi	तू tū	तुम्ही tumhī (formal) आपण āpaṇ (official)	तुम्ही tumhī	तुम्ही tumhī (formal) आपण āpaṇ (official)
Mongolian	чи (chi, ᠴᠢ)	та (ta, ᠲᠠ)	та нар (ta nar, ᠲᠠ ᠨᠠᠷ)	
Nepali	तँ (tã, intimate) तिमी (timī, familiar)	तपाईं (tapāī̃, formal) हजुर (hajur, very formal)	तिमी(-हरू) (timī[-harū]) तपाईं(-हरू) (tapāī̃[-harū]) हजुर(-हरू) (hajur[-harū])	
Norwegian (Bokmål)	du/deg	De/Dem (archaic)	dere/dere	De/Dem (archaic)
Norwegian (Nynorsk)	du/deg	De/Dykk (archaic)	de/dykk	De/Dykk (archaic)
Odia	ତୁ tu ତୁମେ/ତୁମ୍ଭେ tumē/tumbhē	ଆପଣ āpåṇå	ତୁମେମାନେ/ତୁମ୍ଭେମାନେ tumēmānē/tumbhēmānē	ଆପଣମାନେ apåṇåmānē
Persian	تو to	شما shomā		شما shomā شماها shomā-hā
Polish	ty	pani (to a woman) pan (to a man) (verbs following any of the above addresses are in the 3rd person singular form)	wy	państwo (general) panie (to women) panowie (to men) (verbs following any of the above addresses are in the 3rd person plural form, although in many cases for państwo (general) the 2nd person plural form is also possible).
Portuguese in Portugal, Africa, and Asia-Pacific	tu	você; o senhor/ a senhora, sua excelência/ vossa excelência, vós	vocês vós	os senhores/ as senhoras; vossas excelências
Brazilian Portuguese	você, tu	você; o senhor/ a senhora, sua excelência/ vossa excelência, vós	vocês	os senhores/ as senhoras; vossas excelências
Punjabi (Standard)	ਤੂੰ‌ tū̃ توں tū̃	ਤੁਸੀਂ tusī̃ تسیں tusī̃		
Romanian	tu	dumneavoastră (formal) dumneata (less formal, possibly confrontational) dumitale (less formal, possibly confrontational) matale, mata (regional, possibly confrontational)	voi	dumneavoastră (formal) domniile voastre (archaic)
Russian	ты (ty) narrowly reserved intimates (or for insults)	вы (vy) the unmarked norm the capitalised spelling Вы is used in formal correspondence	вы (vy) not capitalised	вы (vy) not capitalised
Rusyn	ты (tŷ)	Bы (Vŷ)	вы (vŷ)	вы (vŷ)
Sanskrit	त्वम् (tvam) त्वा (tva, acc) ते (te, dat and gen), also used in poetry/verse	भवान् (bhavān, addressing a man, root भवत्) भवती (bhavatī, addressing a woman)	युवाम् (dual, yuvām) यूयम् (plural, yūyam) वाम् (vam, dual) वः (vaḥ, plural) for accusative, dative and genitive also used in poetry)	भवन्तौ (dual, bhavantau, addressing men) भवत्यौ (dual, bhavatyau, addressing women) भवन्तः (plural, bhavantaḥ, addressing men) भवत्यः (plural, bhavatyaḥ, addressing women)
Scots	thoo, mostly replaced by ye [ðuː], Southern [ðʌu], Shetland [duː]	ye, you		
Serbo-Croatian	ti	vi/Vi	vi	
Slovak	ty	Vy	vy	
Slovene	ti	vi Vi (protocolar)	vidva (dual) vidve or vedve (dual – when addressing two women); vi (plural) ve (plural – when addressing only women)	vi (dual and plural)
Sorbian (lower)	ty	Wy	wej (dual), wy (plural)	wy
Sorbian (upper)	ty	Wy	wój (dual), wy (plural)	wy
Somali	adi	adiga	idinka	
Spanish	tú (most common) vos (in parts of the Americas, mainly in the Southern Cone and Central America) usted (el otro usted: for informal, horizontal communication in Costa Rica and parts of Colombia)	usted (most common) vos, usía and vuecencia/vuecelencia (literary use)	ustedes (the Americas) vosotros masc. and vosotras fem. (Peninsular Spain, Equatorial Guinea, Philippines)	ustedes vosotros, vosotras (literary)
Swedish	du/dig	Ni/Er (rarely used since the Du-reformen)	ni/er	Ni/Er (rarely used)
Tagalog	ikáw ka (postpositive only)	kayó		
Tajik Persian	ту (tu)	Шумо (Şumo)	шумо (şumo)	шумо (şumo) or шумоён (şumojon; the latter is used in spoken Tajik Persian only)
Tamil	நீ (née)	நீங்கள் (neengal)		
Telugu	నువ్వు (nuvvu)	మీరు (meeru)		
Turkish	sen	siz, sizler	siz	siz, sizler
Ubykh	wæghʷa	sʸæghʷaalha		
Ukrainian	ти (ty)	ви (vy) / Ви (Vy, addressing officials in letters etc.)	ви (vy)	ви (vy)
Urdu	تو (tū, intimate or frozen or vulgar) تم (tum, casual or familiar) آپ (āp, consultative or respectful or cultured, dialectal)	آپ (āp)	تم (tum, intimate or casual or rude) آپ (āp, consultative or respectful or cultured, dialectal)	آپ (āp)
Uyghur	سەن sen	سىز siz or سىلى sili	سىلەر siler	سىزلەر sizler
Uzbek	sen	siz	senlar	sizlar
Welsh (literary)	ti, di	chwi (preferred) or chi		
Welsh (colloquial)	ti, di or chdi (regional variant, not possible when the subject)	chi		
Yiddish	דו (du)	איר (ir)	איר (ir) עץ (ets, regional)	איר (ir)
Zaza	tı	şıma		şımayın

== Related verbs, nouns and pronouns ==
Some languages have a verb to describe the fact of using either a T or a V form. Some also have a related noun or pronoun. The English words are used to refer only to English usage in the past, not to usage in other languages. The analogous distinction may be expressed as "to use first names" or "to be on familiar terms (with someone)".

Related T and V words
Language	T verb	V verb	T noun	V noun
Assamese	তই-তইকৈ মাত (toi-toikoi mat) (very informal), তোমা-তুমিকৈ মাত (tüma-tumikoi mat) (familiar)	আপোনা-আপুনিকৈ মাত (apüna-apunikoi mat)	তই-তই কৰা (toi-toi kora) (very informal), তোমা-তুমি কৰা (tüma-tumi kora) (familiar)	আপোনা-আপুনি কৰা (apüna-apuni kora)
Basque	hika aritu / hika hitz egin (very close)	zuka aritu / zuka hitz egin (neuter / formal) berorika (aritu / hitz egin) (very formal)		
Bengali	তুইতোকারি করা (tuitokāri kôrā) (very informal)	আপনি-আজ্ঞে করা (āpni-āgge kôrā)	তুইতোকারি (very informal)	
Breton	teal / mont dre te / komz dre te	c'hwial / mont dre c'hwi / komz dre c'hwi		
Bulgarian	(говоря / съм) на "ти" (govorya / sam) na "ti"	(говоря / съм) на "Вие" (govorya / sam) na "Vie"	на "ти" na "ti" (more like adverb)	на "Вие" na "Vie" (more like adverb)
Catalan	tutejar / tractar de tu / vós	tractar de vostè	tuteig, tutejament	
Chinese	稱(呼)"你" (chēng(hū) nǐ) / 說"你" (shuō nǐ)	稱(呼)"您" (chēng(hū) nín) / 說"您" (shuō nín)		
Croatian	tikati	vikati	tikanje	vikanje
Czech	tykat	vykat	tykání	vykání
Danish	at være dus	at være Des		
Dutch	tutoyeren; jijen, jouen, jijjouwen (used very rarely)	vousvoyeren	tutoyeren	vousvoyeren
English	to thou (referring to historical usage)	to you (referring to historical usage)	thouing	youing
Esperanto	cidiri	vidiri	cidiro	vidiro
Estonian	sinatama	teietama	sinatamine	teietamine
Faroese	at túa, at siga tú	at siga tygum		
Finnish	sinutella	teititellä	sinuttelu	teitittely
French	tutoyer	vouvoyer; very rarely vousoyer / voussoyer	tutoiement	vouvoiement; very rarely vousoiement / voussoiement
Frisian (West)	dookje	jookje	dookjen	jookjen
Galician	tratar de ti / atuar	tratar de vostede	-	
German	duzen	siezen	Duzen / Per Du	Siezen / Per Sie
Swiss German	Duzis machen	Siezis machen	Duzis	Siezis
Greek	Μιλώ στον ενικό	Μιλώ στον πληθυντικό		Πληθυντικός ευγενείας
Hindi	तू-तुकार करना (tū-tukār karnā) (formal), तू-तड़ाक करना (tū-taṛāk karnā) (very informal)		तू-तुकार (tū-tukār) (formal), तू-तड़ाक (tū-taṛāk)	
Hungarian	tegez	magáz	tegezés	magázás
Icelandic	þúa	þéra	þúun	þérun
Interlingua	tutear	vosear	tuteamento	voseamento
Italian	dare del tu (intransitive) / tuteggiare (transitive, archaic)	dare del Lei / dare del Voi		
Indonesian	mengamukan (transitive); berkamu (intransitive); menggunakan kamu	mengandakan (transitive); beranda (intransitive); menggunakan Anda	pengamuan; penggunaan kamu	pengandaan; penggunaan Anda
Korean	말을 놓다 (mareul notta); 반말하다 (banmalhada)	말을 높이다 (mareul nophida); 존댓말하다 (jondaemmalhada);	반말 (banmal)	높임말 (nopphim mal); 존댓말 (jondaemmal)
Lithuanian	tujinti		tujinimas	
Norwegian	å være dus	å være dis		
Occitan	tutejar	vosejar	tutejament	vosejament
Odia	ତୁ-ତା କରିବା (tū-tā kåribā) (very informal)		ତୁ-ତା (tū-tā) (very informal)	
Polish	mówić per ty tykać (humorous)	mówić per pan / pani	mówienie per ty	mówienie per pan / pani
Portuguese	tratar por tu, você; chamar de tu, você	tratar por senhor / senhora / senhorita; chamar de senhor / senhora / senhorita	–	o senhor / a senhora
Romanian	a tutui	a domni	tutuire	plural de politeţe
Russian	обращаться на "ты" быть на "ты" тыкать (tykat') (colloquial)	обращаться на "вы" быть на "вы" выкать (vykat') (colloquial)	тыканье (tykan'ye)	выканье (vykan'ye)
Serbian	не персирати (ne persirati), бити на ти (biti na ti), тикати (tikati)	персирати (persirati), бити на ви (biti na vi), викати (vikati)	неперсирање (nepersiranje), тикање (tikanje)	персирање (persiranje), викање (vikanje)
Slovak	tykať	vykať	tykanie	vykanie
Slovene	tikati	vikati	tikanje	vikanje
Upper Sorbian	ty prajić, tykać	wy rěkać / prajić, wykać	tykanje	wykanje
Lower Sorbian	ty groniś, tykaś (se) {lit.}	wy groniś, wykaś {lit.}	ty gronjenje, tykanje	wy gronjenje, wykanje
Spanish	tutear, vosear	ustedear; tratar de usted	tuteo, voseo	ustedeo
Swedish	dua	nia	duande	niande
Turkish	senli benli olmak / konuşmak, sen diye çağırmak	sizli bizli olmak / konuşmak, siz diye çağırmak	senli benli	sizli bizli
Ukrainian	тикати (tykaty), звертатися на "ти" (zvertatysia na "ty")	викати (vykaty), звертатися на "ви" (zvertatysia na "vy")	тикання (tykannia), звертання на ти (zvertannia na ty)	викання (vykannia), звертання на ви (zvertannia na vy)
Urdu	تو تکار کرنا (tū-tukār karnā) (formal), تو تڑاک کرنا (tū-taṛāk karnā) (very informal)		تو تکار (tū-tukār) (formal), تو تڑاک (tū-taṛāk) (very informal)	
Welsh	tydïo	galw chi ar X	tydïo	galw chi ar X
Yiddish	דוצן (dutsn) זײַן אױף דו (zayn af du) זײַן פּער דו (zayn per du)	אירצן (irtsn) זײַן אױף איר (zayn af ir)	דוצן (dutsn) אַריבערגיין אױף דו (aribergeyn af du)	אירצן (irtsn)

== See also ==
- Honorific
- Honorifics (linguistics)
- Hypocorism
- Pluractionality, another plural device used for politeness
- Style (form of address)

== Sources ==
- Balbo, Sophie (23 June 2005). "Dites-moi tu". L'Hebdo (in French).
- Blume, Mary (19 February 2000). "Mastering the Unmasterable: A French Puzzle". International Herald Tribune.
- Brown, Roger; Gilman, Albert (1960). "The pronouns of power and solidarity". In T. A. Sebeok (ed.). Style in Language. Cambridge, MA: MIT Press. pp. 253–276.
- Crystal, David (2004). The Stories of English. Overlook Press.
- Crystal, David; Crystal, Ben (2002). Shakespeare's Words: A Glossary and Language Companion. Penguin Books.
- Fagyal, Zsuzsanna; Kibbee, Douglas; Jenkins, Frederic (28 September 2006). French: A Linguistic Introduction. Cambridge University Press. ISBN 978-1-139-45956-3.
- Giglioli, Per Paolo (1972). Language and Social Context: Selected Readings. Penguin Books.
- Helmbrecht, Johannes (2005). "Politeness distinctions in pronouns". In Martin Haspelmath; et al. (eds.). The World Atlas of Language Structures. Oxford: Oxford University Press. pp. 186–190. ISBN 978-0-19-925591-7.
- Taavitsainen, Irma; Jucker, Andreas H. (2003). Diachronic Perspectives on Address Term Systems. John Benjamins. ISBN 1-58811-310-8.
- Kleinman, Scott (2009). "About Middle English Grammar" (PDF).
- The Compact Edition of the Oxford English Dictionary. New York: Oxford University Press. 1971.
