= Du-reformen =

1960s linguistic shift in Sweden

Du-reformen (Swedish pronunciation: [ˈdʉ̂ːrɛˌfɔrmɛn]), literally "the du reform," was the process of popularization of the second-person singular pronoun du as a universal form of address in Sweden that took place in the late 1960s. The use of du (cognate with English thou, French tu, and German du) replaced an intricate former system where people chiefly addressed each other in third person, with or without a preceding Mr./Mrs./Ms. (herr, fru or fröken) before the title, often omitting both surname and given name. Less respectfully, people could be addressed with Mr./Mrs./Ms. plus surname, or in a family setting, alternatively even less respectfully, with the plain name or third person pronoun han ('he') or hon ('she').

Before du-reformen, it was considered impolite to address most people without an appropriate title, although a subordinate could be addressed by name, or less respectfully as Ni or han/hon. The informal du had been used for addressing children, siblings, close friends and possibly for cousins, but hardly for elder relatives. With exceptions in dialectal usage, the second-person plural pronoun Ni had long been considered degrading when used to address a single person. However, the usage varied between different parts of the country, and as well by social context, both before and after the reform.

Finland Swedish has undergone a similar development, but slower and slightly less due to influence of the somewhat more conservative usage in Finnish. In particular, the use of second-person plural (Ni) to address an unknown person is considered respectful or neutral rather than degrading.

== History ==
In the Swedish of Sweden, the polite ni was known from earlier epochs, but had come to be considered careless, bullying or rude; instead, an intricate system had evolved in order to prudently step around pronouns almost altogether.

- Addressing in third person singular adding title and surname was considered proper and respectful in most cases. But with persons of higher standing, say a doctor, count or managing director, there arose the question when to use that title only and when to precede it with a herr ('mister' or, in this context, 'sir'); not doubling such titles could be very rude unless you were on somewhat informal terms. A woman, married to a husband with a specific title in a male-dominated profession, was addressed using the feminine form of her husband's title as a matter of course. This created its own set of problems as more and more women acquired professional titles of their own, who in general are addressed with the male form (such as kapten (captain)), as the feminine form (kaptenskan) questions their competence. Female-dominated professions however use feminine forms for women, such as sjuksköterska (nurse) or lärarinnan (teacher).
- If two persons were somewhat acquainted and not too far apart in rank and age, they could then drop the name and use the title only.
- Surname without title was considered proper between friends not too close and for a superior to his subordinate or someone of similar rank. That was also customary in male brotherhoods like between students.
- Below that on the social scale, both among peers and from above, was the third person singular pronoun only (han 'he', hon 'she'). That was more usual in the countryside; considered rustic by "educated" people, but fitting towards e.g. an old fisher- or woodman.
- Simple folks of venerable age could be properly addressed father/mother/aunt plus Christian name (far/mor/moster), both by their own, by other villagers and by superiors. A farmwife could be addressed as mor even if young; otherwise, one had to make do with the nearest-fitting other way of addressing.
- A master could address his servant, and a farmer his farmhand, by Christian name in the third person; that was more common between females, as the female world was generally more confined, but more restricted between the sexes. A subordinate, in each case, answered by using the superior's title or, in private, the informal term for his rank (e.g. herrn, patron).
- The proper kinship term plus Christian name, still never alternating with pronoun, was proper in private to nearer relatives.

The second person singular du was used only to and between children, within a married couple, between lovers or to a more or less voluntary mistress of lower standing, and between friends who had toasted for brotherhood with each other ('toasted for thou' in a "du-skål" as it was known)—of course initiated by the elder or higher-ranked party. Again, the custom could be slightly more relaxed among women—at least the toast itself was usually dispensed with. Otherwise, du could be used to insult a tramp or the like.

Parts of this system began to erode around the Second World War or so, but the essentials held up into the late 1960s.

In the province of Dalarna, however, and in some other remote places with few upper-class people, the du/ni distinction had remained one of number only; although children addressed their parents with Father/Mother (Far/Mor) rather than a grammatically logical du. In other remote places, the Ni survived in its older form I (cognate with 'ye') as both the second person plural pronoun and the polite address to singular elders, including one's parents, unless classified with "better people". In standard Swedish, that form had become archaic and solemn well before the 20th century. (I is capitalized to avoid confusion with a common homograph, the preposition i ('in'), rather than out of respect.)

As the twentieth century progressed, this circumlocutive system of addressing, with its innumerable ambiguities and opportunities for unintentional offence, was increasingly felt as a nuisance. An early way out was to carry the circumlocutions one degree further—finding impersonal ways of saying what was needful, avoiding both personal pronoun and title (Får det lov att vara en kopp kaffe?, approximately 'Might it be a cup of coffee?'; Så det är till att resa?, approximately 'So, it is about travelling?'), often using the passive voice. However, that soon proved of little avail. One still had to occasionally address the person they are talking with directly to not sound impolite; and, over time, it became de rigueur to do so more and more often, until the system had lengthy titles used instead of personal pronouns in addition to impersonal circumlocutions. Furthermore, the impersonal constructions soon acquired their own gradations, to be observant upon—e.g., that in the second example above being perceived as more and more rustic, ending up rude.

== Reform ==
The beginning of du-reformen is associated with Bror Rexed, the then head of the National Board of Health and Welfare (Socialstyrelsen), who in his welcome speech to the staff in 1967 announced that he would address everyone as du, increasing the effects of the reform and bringing it to a more frequent use.

The actual reform had started earlier, including the amended language in the major newspaper Dagens Nyheter. It was seen as a reform in a democratic and egalitarian direction. First, authorities and influential circles had tried rehabilitating the Ni in a so-called "ni-reform". But most people could not bring themselves to feel civil using that. Then, in a process dubbed the "du reform", the system rapidly broke down and the informal du became the accepted way of addressing any one person except royalty.

The language used for addressing members of the Swedish royal family also changed, but third person addressing still dominates in official settings. The universal ers majestät ('Your Majesty'), etc. became rare, possibly used on formal occasions, and is replaced by konungen or kungen ("the King"), kronprinsessan ("the Crown Princess"), etc.

In parallel with du-reformen, the use of titles was further reduced. In many other countries, professional titles rather than names are used to attract someone's attention, while this is not usually the case in Sweden. Only slightly less accepted is the use of Christian name also when addressing an acquaintance or colleague (Daniel, Pia, etc.).

Since about 1990, it has become somewhat more common for retail and restaurant staff to address customers as ni (second-person plural), although this was not formerly considered formal language. In the Riksdag, where debate is conducted via the Speaker, titles are frequently used, even though politicians are most often addressed as du in other contexts.

In order to "alleviate the intrusion" in writing, e.g. in letters or in advertisement, the Du can be capitalized. That usage was most widespread in the early days of universal du address; it has become slightly more common again simultaneously with the partial Ni revival.

== See also ==
- Honorific
- Style (manner of address)
- T–V distinction
- Thou
