= Phonological history of Old English =

The phonological system of the Old English language underwent many changes during the period of its existence. These included a number of vowel shifts, and the palatalisation of velar consonants in many positions.

For historical developments prior to the Old English period, see Proto-Germanic language.

== Phonetic transcription ==
Various conventions are used below for describing Old English words, reconstructed parent forms of various sorts and reconstructed Proto-West-Germanic (PWG), Proto-Germanic (PG) and Proto-Indo-European (PIE) forms:

- Forms in italics denote either Old English words as they appear in spelling or reconstructed forms of various sorts. Where phonemic ambiguity occurs in Old English spelling, extra diacritics are used (ċ, ġ, ā, ǣ, ē, ī, ō, ū, ȳ).
- Forms between /slashes/ or [brackets] indicate, respectively, broad (phonemic) or narrow (allophonic) pronunciation. Sounds are indicated using standard IPA notation.

The following table indicates the correspondence between spelling and pronunciation transcribed in the International Phonetic Alphabet. For details of the relevant sound systems, see Proto-Germanic phonology and Old English phonology.

| Sound | Spelling | Pronunciation |
|---|---|---|
| Short vowels | o e etc. | /o e/ etc. |
| Short nasal vowels | ǫ ę etc. | /õ ẽ/ etc. |
| Long vowels | ō ē etc. | /oː eː/ etc. |
| Long nasal vowels | ǭ ę̄ etc. | /õː ẽː/ etc. |
| Overlong vowels | ô ê | /oːː eːː/ |
| Overlong nasal vowels | ǫ̂ ę̂ | /õːː ẽːː/ |
| "Long" diphthongs | ēa ēo īo īe | /æːɑ eːo iːu iːy/ |
| "Short" diphthongs | ea eo io ie | /æɑ eo iu iy/ |
| Old English unpalatalized velars^{1} | c sc g ng gg | /k sk/ [ɣ ŋɡ ɡ] |
| Old English palatalized velars^{1} | ċ sċ ġ nġ ċġ | /tʃ ʃ/ [j ndʒ ddʒ] |
| Proto-Germanic velars^{1} | k sk g; sometimes also ɣ | /k sk/ [ɡ ɣ] |
| Proto-Germanic voiced stops/fricatives^{1} | b d g; sometimes also β, ð or đ, ɣ | [b~β] [d~ð] [ɡ~ɣ] |

^{1}Proto-Germanic /b d ɡ/ had two allophones each: stops [b d ɡ] and fricatives [β ð ɣ]. The stops occurred:

1. following a nasal;
2. when geminated;
3. word-initially, for /b/ and /d/ only;
4. following /l/, for /d/ only.

By West Germanic times, /d/ was pronounced as a stop [d] in all positions. The fricative allophones are sometimes indicated in reconstructed forms to make it easier to understand the development of Old English consonants. Old English retained the allophony [ɡ~ɣ], which in case of palatalisation (see below) became [dʒ~j]. Later, non-palatalized [ɣ] became [ɡ] word-initially. The allophony [b~β] was broken when [β] merged with [v], the voiced allophone of /f/.

== Phonological processes ==
A number of phonological processes affected Old English in the period before the earliest documentation. The processes affected especially vowels and are the reason that many Old English words look significantly different from related words in languages such as Old High German, which is much closer to the common West Germanic ancestor of both languages. The processes took place chronologically in roughly the order described below (with uncertainty in ordering as noted).

=== Absorption of nasals before fricatives ===
This is the source of such alternations as modern English five, mouth, us versus German fünf, Mund, uns. For detail see Ingvaeonic nasal spirant law.

=== First a-fronting ===
The Anglo-Frisian languages underwent a sound change in their development from Proto-West-Germanic by which ⟨ā⟩ [ɑː], unless followed by /n, m/ or nasalized, was fronted to ⟨ǣ⟩ [æː]. This was similar to the later process affecting short ⟨a⟩, which is known as Anglo-Frisian brightening or First Fronting (see below). Nasalized ą̄ and the sequences ān, ām were unaffected and were later raised to ǭ, ōn, ōm (see below). (This may be taken to imply that a nasal consonant n, m caused a preceding long vowel to nasalise.) In the non-West-Saxon dialects of English (including the Anglian dialect underlying Modern English) the fronted vowel was further raised to ē [eː]: W.S. slǣpan, sċēap (< Proto-West-Germanic *slāpąn, *skāpă < Proto-Germanic *slēpaną, skēpą) versus Anglian slēpan, sċēp. The Modern English descendants sleep and sheep reflect the Anglian vowel; the West Saxon words would have developed to *sleap, *sheap.

The vowel affected by this change, which is reconstructed as being a low back vowel ā [ɑː] in Proto-West-Germanic, was the reflex of Proto-Germanic /ɛː/. It is possible that in Anglo-Frisian, Proto-Germanic /ɛː/ simply remained a front vowel, developing to Old English ǣ or ē without ever passing through an intermediate stage as the back vowel [ɑː]. However, borrowings such as Old English strǣt from Latin strāta (via) and the backing to ō before nasals are much easier to explain under the assumption of a common West Germanic stage *ā.

=== Monophthongization ===
Proto-Germanic /ai/ was monophthongized (smoothed) to /aː/ ([ɑː]). This occurred after first a-fronting. For example, Proto-Germanic **stainaz became Old English stān (modern stone) (cf. Old Frisian stēn vs. Gothic stáin, Old High German stein). In many cases, the resulting [ɑː] was later fronted to [æː] by i-mutation: dǣlan "to divide" (cf. Old Frisian dēla vs. Gothic dáiljan, Old High German teilen [Modern English deal]).

It is possible that this monophthongization occurred via the height harmonisation that produced the other diphthongs in Old English (presumably through an intermediate stage: /ai/ > [ɑæ] > /aː/).

A similar sound change has occurred in Southern American English and African-American Vernacular English.

=== Second a-fronting ===
The second part of a-fronting, called Anglo-Frisian brightening or First Fronting, is very similar to the first part except that it affects short a instead of long ā. Here a [ɑ] is fronted to æ [æ] unless followed by /n, m/ or nasalized, the same conditions as applied in the first part.

Importantly, a-fronting was blocked by n, m only in stressed syllables, not unstressed syllables, which accounts for forms like ġefen (formerly ġefæn) "given" from Proto-Germanic *gebanaz. However, the infinitive ġefan retains its back vowel due to a-restoration (see the explanation given in that section for the similar case of faren vs. faran).

=== Diphthong height harmonisation ===
Proto-Germanic had the closing diphthongs /ai, au, eu/ (and [iu], an allophone of /eu/ when an /i/ or /j/ followed in the next syllable). In Old English, these (except /ai/, which had been monophthongised, as noted above) developed into diphthongs of a generally less common type in which both elements are of the same height, called height-harmonic diphthongs. This process is called diphthong height harmonisation. Specifically:

- /au/ [ɑu] underwent a-fronting to /æu/ and was then harmonised to /æːɑ/, spelled ⟨ea⟩ (or in modern texts ⟨ēa⟩).
- /eu/ [eu] was harmonised to /eːo/, spelled ⟨eo⟩ (or in modern texts ⟨ēo⟩).
- [iu] was already harmonic; it became a separate phoneme /iːu/, spelled ⟨io⟩ (or in modern texts ⟨īo⟩). (This interpretation is somewhat controversial; see below.)

Old English diphthongs also arose from other later processes, such as breaking, palatal diphthongisation, back mutation and i-mutation, which also gave an additional diphthong ie /iy/. The diphthongs could occur both short (monotonic) /æa, eo, iu, iy/ and long /æːa, eːo, iːu, iːy/.

Some sources reconstruct other phonetic forms that are not height-harmonic for some or all of these Old English diphthongs. The first elements of ēa, ēo, īo are generally accepted to have had the qualities [æ], [e], [i] (evidence for these qualities comes from the behaviour of breaking and back mutation as described below; the Middle English development of short ea into /a/ could also provide some evidence for the phonetic realisation of ēa). However, the interpretations of the second elements of these diphthongs are more varied. There are analyses that treat all of these diphthongs as ending in a schwa sound [ə]; i.e. ēa, ēo, īo = [æə], [eə], [iə]. For io and ie, the height-harmonic interpretations /iu/ and /iy/ are controversial, with many (especially more traditional) sources assuming that the pronunciation matched the spelling (/io/, /ie/), and hence that these diphthongs were of the opening rather than the height-harmonic type. In Early West Saxon, and later in Anglian io (both long and short) merged with eo.

=== Breaking and retraction ===
Vowel breaking in Old English is the diphthongization of the short front vowels /i, e, æ/ to short diphthongs /iu, eo, æɑ/ when followed by /x/, /w/ or by /r/ or /l/ plus another consonant. Long /iː, æː/ similarly broke to /iːu, æːa/, but only when followed by /x/. The geminates rr and ll usually count as r or l plus another consonant, but breaking does not occur before ll produced by West Germanic gemination of original single *-l- + *-j- (although it does occur before original *-lli(j)-).

/iu, iːu/ were lowered to /eo, eːo/ in Early West Saxon and late Anglian (see above).

The exact conditions for breaking vary somewhat depending on the sound being broken:

- Short /æ/ breaks before h, rC, lC, where C is any consonant.
- Short /e/ breaks before h, rC, lh, lc, w, i.e. compared to /æ/ it is also broken before w, but is broken before l only in the combination lh and sometimes lc.
- Short /i/ breaks before h, rC, w. However, it does not break before wi, and in the Anglian dialects breaking before rCi happens only in the combination *rzi (e.g. Anglian iorre "anger" from *irziją but afirran from *a+firrijaną).
- Long ī and ǣ break only before h.

Examples:

- weorpan [ˈweorpɑn] "to throw" < */ˈwerpan/
- wearp [wæɑrp] "threw (sing.)" < */wærp/
- feoh [feox] "money" < */feh/
- feaht [fæaxt] "fought (sing.)" < */fæht/
- healp [hæaɫp] "helped (sing.)" < */hælp/ (but no breaking in helpan "to help" because the consonant after /l/ is not /h/)
- feorr [feorr] "far" < */ferr/
- feallan [ˈfæɑllɑn] "to fall" < */ˈfællan/ (but tellan < earlier */ˈtælljan/ < Proto-Germanic *taljaną is not broken because it developed by West Germanic gemination)
- eolh [eoɫx] "elk" < */elh/
- liornian, leornian [ˈliurniɑn], [ˈleorniɑn] "to learn" < earlier */ˈlirnoːjan/
- nēah "near" [næːɑx] (cf. "nigh") < */næːh/
- lēon "to lend" [leːon] < */liːun/ < */ˈliuhan/ < */ˈliːhan/

The i-mutation of broken /iu, eo, æa/ (whether long or short) is spelled ⟨ie⟩ (possibly /iy/, see above).

Examples:

- hwierfþ "turns" (intr.) < /ˈhwiurfiθ/ + i-mutation < /ˈhwirfiθ/ + breaking < Proto-Germanic *hwirbiþi < early Proto-Germanic *hwerbiþi
- hwierfan "to turn" (tr.) < /ˈhwæarfijan/ + i-mutation < /ˈhwærfijan/ + breaking < /ˈhwarfijan/ + a-fronting < Proto-Germanic *hwarbijaną
- nīehst "nearest" (cf. "next") < /ˈnæːahist/ + i-mutation < /ˈnæːhist/ + breaking < /ˈnaːhist/ + a-fronting < Proto-Germanic *nēhist
- līehtan "to lighten" < /ˈliːuhtijan/ + i-mutation < /ˈliːhtijan/ + breaking < Proto-Germanic *līhtijaną

Note that in some dialects /æ/ was backed (retracted) to /a/ ([ɑ]) rather than broken, when occurring in the circumstances described above that would normally trigger breaking. This happened in the dialect of Anglia that partially underlies Modern English, and explains why Old English ceald appears as Modern English "cold" (actually from Anglian Old English cald) rather than "*cheald" (the expected result of ceald).

Breaking and retraction commonly explained in terms of assimilation of the vowel to a following velar consonant. While /w/ is in fact a velar consonant, /h/, /l/, and /r/ are less obviously so. It is therefore assumed that, at least at the time of the occurrence of breaking and retraction (several hundred years before recorded Old English), /h/ was pronounced [x] or similar – at least when following a vowel – and /l/ and /r/ before a consonant had a velar or retroflex quality and were already pronounced [ɫ] and [rˠ], or similar.

Howell 1991 disputes the common assumption that postvocalic ⟨h⟩ must have been pronounced as velar [x] at the time of vowel breaking. He argues that this is problematic regardless of which order is assumed for the sound changes of velar palatalization and breaking: if breaking occurred before palatalization and was triggered by [x], there is no clear explanation for why vowels did not break before the other velar consonants (from Proto-Germanic *k and *ɡ), whereas if breaking occurred after palatalization, there is no clear explanation for why [x] was still velar after front vowels, when the other velar consonants had become palatalized in this position. Howell proposes instead that prior to Old English, *x was originally weakened to [h] in all positions (which he argues is supported by its loss between vowels), and that this [h] became strengthened to [x] in the syllable coda later on, perhaps at the time when it merged phonemically with the devoiced outcome of former [ɣ].

Peter Schrijver has theorized that Old English breaking developed from language contact with Celtic languages. He says that two Celtic languages were spoken in Britain, Highland British Celtic, which was phonologically influenced by British Latin and developed into Welsh, Cornish and Breton, and Lowland British Celtic, which was brought to Ireland at the time of the Roman conquest of Britain and became Old Irish. Lowland British Celtic had velarization like Old and Modern Irish, which gives preceding vowels a back offglide. That feature came by language contact to Old English and resulted in backing diphthongs.

=== A-restoration ===
After breaking occurred, short /æ/ (and in some dialects long /æː/ as well) was backed to /a/ ([ɑ]) when there was a back vowel in the following syllable. This is called a-restoration, because it partly restored original /a/, which had earlier been fronted to /æ/ (see above). (Note: The situation is complicated somewhat by a later change called second fronting, but this did not affect the standard West Saxon dialect of Old English.)

Because strong masculine and neuter nouns have back vowels in plural endings, alternations with /æ/ in the singular vs. /a/ in the plural are common in this noun class:

/æ/~/a/ alternation in masculine and neuter strong nouns
| Case | Masculine | | Neuter | |
| Case | Singular | Plural | Singular | Plural |
|---|---|---|---|---|
| Nominative and accusative | dæġ | dagas | fæt | fatu |
| Genitive | dæġes | daga | fætes | fata |
| Dative | dæġe | dagum | fæte | fatum |

A-restoration occurred before the *ō of the weak verb suffix *-ōj-, although this surfaces in Old English as the front vowel i, as in macian "to make" < **makōjan-.

Breaking (see above) occurred between a-fronting and a-restoration. This order is necessary to account for words like slēan "to slay" (pronounced /slæːɑn/) from original *slahan: /ˈslahan/ > /ˈslæhan/ (a-fronting) > /ˈslæɑhɑn/ (breaking; inhibits a-restoration) > /ˈslæɑ.ɑn/ (h-loss) > /slæːɑn/ (vowel coalescence, compensatory lengthening).

A-restoration interacted in a tricky fashion with a-fronting (Anglo-Frisian brightening) to produce e.g. faran "to go" from Proto-Germanic *faraną but faren "gone" from Proto-Germanic *faranaz. Basically:

| Step | "to go" | "gone" | Reason |
|---|---|---|---|
| 1 | *faraną | *faranaz | original form |
| 2 | *faraną | *farana | loss of final z |
| 3 | *faræną | *farænæ | Anglo-Frisian brightening |
| 4 | *faraną | *farænæ | a-restoration |
| 5 | *faran | *faræn | loss of final short vowels |
| 6 | faran | faren | collapse of unstressed short front vowels to /e/ |

Note that the key difference is in steps 3 and 4, where nasalised ą is unaffected by a-fronting even though the sequence an is in fact affected, since it occurs in an unstressed syllable. This leads to a final-syllable difference between a and æ, which is transferred to the preceding syllable in step 4. The presence of back a in the stem of both forms is not directly explainable by sound change, and appears to have been the result of simple analogical levelling.

=== Palatalization ===
Palatalization of the velar consonants /k/ and /ɡ/ occurred in certain environments, mostly involving front vowels. (The phoneme /ɡ/ at that time had two allophones: [ɡ] after /n/ or when geminated, and [ɣ] everywhere else.) This palatalisation is similar to what occurred in Italian and Swedish. When palatalised:

- /k/ became [k'] (an unvoiced palatal plosive; it would later become /tʃ/)
- /sk/ became /ʃ/
- [ɡ] became [dʒ]
- [ɣ] became [ʝ] (a voiced palatal fricative; it would later become [j], but not before the loss of older /j/ in certain positions discussed below)

The contexts for palatalisation were sometimes different for different sounds:

- Before /i, iː, j/, for example:
  - ċīdan ("to chide"), bēċ ("books", from earlier *bōkiz/), sēċan ("seek", from earlier *sōkijaną) (/k/ > /tʃ/)
  - bryċġ ("bridge", from earlier West Germanic *ˈbruɡɡju after Proto-Germanic *brugjō) ([ɡɡ] > [ddʒ])
  - ġiefþ ("gives") ([ɣ] > [j])
- Before other front vowels and diphthongs, in the case of word-initial /k/ and all [ɣ], for example:
  - ċeorl ("churl"), ċēas ("chose (sg.)"), ċeald ("cold") (initial /k/ > /tʃ/)
  - ġeaf /jæf/ ("gave"), ġeard ("yard") ([ɣ] > [j])
- After /i/, /iː/ (possibly with an intervening /n/), unless a back vowel followed, for example:
  - iċ ("I"), dīċ ("ditch, dike") (/k/ > /tʃ/)
  - In wicu ("week"), the /k/ is not affected due to the following /u/
- For [ɣ] and /sk/ only, after other front vowels (/e/, /eː/, /æ/, /æː/), unless a back vowel followed, for example:
  - weġ ("way"), næġl("nail"), mǣġ ("relative") ([ɣ] > [j])
  - fisċ ("fish") (/sk/ > /ʃ/)
  - In wegas ("ways") the [ɣ] is not affected due to the following /ɑ/
  - In āscian ("ask", from earlier *aiskōjaną) the /sk/ remains due to the *ō.
- For word-initial /sk/, always, even when followed by a back vowel or /r/, for example:
  - sċip ("ship"), sċuldor ("shoulder"), sċort ("short"), sċrūd ("dress", giving modern shroud) (/sk/ > /ʃ/)

The palatals /tʃ/ and [dʒ] reverted to their non-palatal equivalents /k/ and /g/ when they came to stand immediately before a consonant, even if this occurred at a significantly later period, as when *sēċiþ ("seeks") became sēcþ, and *senġiþ ("singes") became sengþ.

Palatalization occurred after a-restoration and before i-mutation (although it is unclear whether it occurred before or after h-loss). Thus, it did not occur in galan "to sing", with the first /a/ backed from /æ/ due to a-restoration. Similarly, palatalisation occurred in dæġ ("day"), but not in a-restored dagas ("days"; cf. dialectal English dawes "days") or in dagung ("dawn", where the ⟨w⟩ represents the reflex of unpalatalised [ɣ]). Nor did it occur in cyning ("king"), cemban ("to comb") or gēs ("geese"), where the front vowels /y, e, eː/ developed from earlier /u, a, oː/ due to i-mutation.

In many instances where a ċ/c, ġ/g, or sċ/sc alternation would be expected within a paradigm, it was levelled out by analogy at some point in the history of the language. For example, the velar of sēcþ "he seeks" has replaced the palatal of sēċan "to seek" in Modern English; on the other hand, the palatalised forms of besēċan have replaced the velar forms, giving modern beseech.

The sounds /k~tʃ/ and /ɡ~j/ had almost certainly split into distinct phonemes by Late West Saxon, the dialect in which the majority of Old English documents are written. This is suggested by such near-minimal pairs as drincan [ˈdriŋkɑn] ("drink") vs. drenċan [ˈdrentʃɑn] ("drench"), and gēs [ɡeːs] ("geese") vs. ġē [jeː] ("you"). Nevertheless, there are few true minimal pairs, and velars and palatals often alternate with each other in ways reminiscent of allophones, for example:

- ċēosan [ˈtʃeːozan] ("to choose") vs. curon [ˈkuron] ("chose", plural form)
- ġēotan [ˈjeːotan] ("to pour") vs. guton [ˈɡuton] ("poured", plural form)

The voiced velars [ɡ] and [ɣ] were still allophones of a single phoneme (although by now [ɡ] was the form used in initial position); similarly, their respective palatalised reflexes [dʒ] and [j] are analysed as allophones of a single phoneme /j/ at this stage. This /j/ also included older instances of [j] which derived from Proto-Germanic /j/, and could stand before back vowels, as in ġeong /junɡ/ ("young"; from PGmc *jungaz) and ġeoc /jok/ ("yoke"; from PGmc *juką). (See also Old English phonology: dorsal consonants.)

Standard Old English spelling did not reflect the split, and used the same letter ⟨c⟩ for both /k/ and /tʃ/, and ⟨g⟩ for both /ɡ/ ([ɡ], [ɣ]) and /j/ ([j], [dʒ]). In the standard modernised orthography (as used here), the velar and palatal variants are distinguished with a diacritic: ⟨c⟩ stands for /k/, ⟨ċ⟩ for /tʃ/, ⟨g⟩ for [ɡ] and [ɣ], and ⟨ġ⟩ for [j] and [dʒ]. The geminates of these are written ⟨cc⟩, ⟨ċċ⟩, ⟨cg⟩, ⟨ċġ⟩.

Loanwords from Old Norse typically do not display any palatalisation, showing that at the time they were borrowed the palatal–velar distinction was no longer allophonic and the two sets were now separate phonemes. Compare, for example, the modern doublet shirt and skirt; these both derive from the same Germanic root, but shirt underwent Old English palatalisation, whereas skirt comes from a Norse borrowing which did not. Similarly, give, an unpalatalised Norse borrowing, existed alongside (and eventually displaced) the regularly palatalised yive. Other later loanwords similarly escaped palatalisation: compare ship (from palatalised Old English sċip) with skipper (borrowed from unpalatalised Dutch schipper).

=== Second fronting ===
Second fronting fronted /a/ to /æ/, and /æ/ to /e/, later than related processes of a-fronting and a-restoration. Second fronting took place only in a relatively small section of the area (English Midlands) where the Mercian dialect was spoken. (Mercian itself was a subdialect of the Anglian dialect, which was spoken across all of Central and Northern England.)

=== Palatal diphthongization ===
The front vowels e, ē, æ, ǣ usually become ie, īe, ea, ēa respectively after ċ, ġ, and sċ in West Saxon:

- sċieran "to cut", sċear "cut (past sing.)", sċēaron "cut (past pl.)", which belongs to the same conjugation class (IV) as beran "to carry", bær "carried (sing.)", bǣron "carried (pl.)"
- ġiefan "to give", ġeaf "gave (sing.)", ġēafon "gave (pl.)", ġiefen "given", which belongs to the same conjugation class (V) as tredan "to tread", træd "trod (sing.)", trǣdon "trod (pl.)", treden "trodden"

The traditional view is that e, ē, æ, and ǣ actually became diphthongs, but a minority view is that they remained as monophthongs:

- sċieran [ˈʃerɑn], ġiefan [ˈjevɑn], ġiefen [ˈjeven]
- sċear [ʃær], ġeaf [jæf]
- sċēaron [ˈʃæːron], ġēafon [ˈjæːvon]

The main arguments in favour of this view are the fact that the corresponding process involving back vowels is indeed purely orthographic, and that diphthongizations like /æ/ → [æɑ] and /e/ → [iy] (if this, contrary to the traditional view, is the correct interpretation of orthographic ie) are phonetically unmotivated in the context of a preceding palatal or postalveolar consonant. In addition, both some advocates of the traditional view of ie and some advocates of the interpretation [iy] believe that the i in ie after palatal consonants never expressed a separate sound. Thus, it has been argued that the [iy] pronunciation only applied to the instances of ie expressing the sound resulting from i-mutation. In any case, it is thought plausible that the two merged as [iə̆] at a fairly early stage.

It is controversial whether a type of palatal diphthongization ever affected the back vowels ā̆, ō̆, ū̆. Sequences of palatal + back vowel, such as ġu, ġō, sċa, developed variant spellings with the letter e between the palatal consonant and the back vowel. However, it is disputed whether these spellings with e represent phonetic diphthongization of the vowel, or just the palatal quality of the consonant itself.

- Short and long a varies in spelling with ea, as in sċamian, sċeamian "be ashamed" and sċādan, sċeādan "divide".
- Short and long o varies in spelling with eo, as in sċort, sċeort "short" and ġesċōp, ġesċeōp 'created'.
- Short and long u varies in spelling with eo, as in iung, ġeong "young" and sċūfan, sċeōfan "shove".

The frequency of the spellings with or without e could vary depending on several factors: the identity of vowel, whether the preceding consonant was /j/ or sċ, and the dialect of Old English. Rather than indicating the development of a diphthong, these spellings might have just been a convention for marking palatal consonants before the back vowels /ɑ(ː) o(ː) u(ː)/, since the modern English descendants of such words do not display the typical evolution of the diphthong ⟨eo⟩ to a front vowel:

- PG *jungaz > OE ġeong 'young' (Modern English /jʌŋ/, not *yeng)
- PG *skuldē > sċeolde 'should' (Modern English /ʃʊd/, not *sheeld)

=== Metathesis of r ===
Original sequences of an r followed by a short vowel metathesized, with the vowel and r switching places. This normally only occurred when the next following consonant was s or n, and sometimes d. The r could be initial or follow another consonant, but not a vowel.

- Before s: berstan "to burst" (Icelandic bresta), gærs "grass" (Gothic gras), þerscan "to thresh" (Gothic þriskan)
- Before n: byrnan ~ beornan "to burn (intr.)" (Gothic brinnan), irnan "to run" (Gothic rinnan), īren "iron" (< *īsren < īsern; Gothic eisarn), wærna "wren" (Icelandic rindill), ærn "house" (Gothic razn)
- Before d: þirda "third" (Gothic þridja), Northumbrian bird "chick, nestling" (standard bryd)

Not all potential words to which metathesis can apply are actually affected, and many of the above words also appear in their unmetathesized form (e.g. græs "grass", rinnan "to run", wrenna "wren", rare forms (brustæn "burst (past part.)", þrescenne "to thresh", onbran "set fire to (past)", īsern "iron", ren- "house", þridda "third"; briddes "birds" in Chaucer). Many of the words have come down to Modern English in their unmetathesized forms.

Metathesis in the other direction occasionally occurs before ht, e.g. wrohte "worked" (cf. obsolescent wrought; Gothic wurhta), Northumbrian breht ~ bryht "bright" (Gothic baírhts), fryhto "fright" (Gothic faúrhtei), wryhta "maker" (cf. wright; Old Saxon wurhtio). Unmetathesized forms of all of these words also occur in Old English. The phenomenon occurred in most Germanic languages.

=== I-mutation (i-umlaut) ===
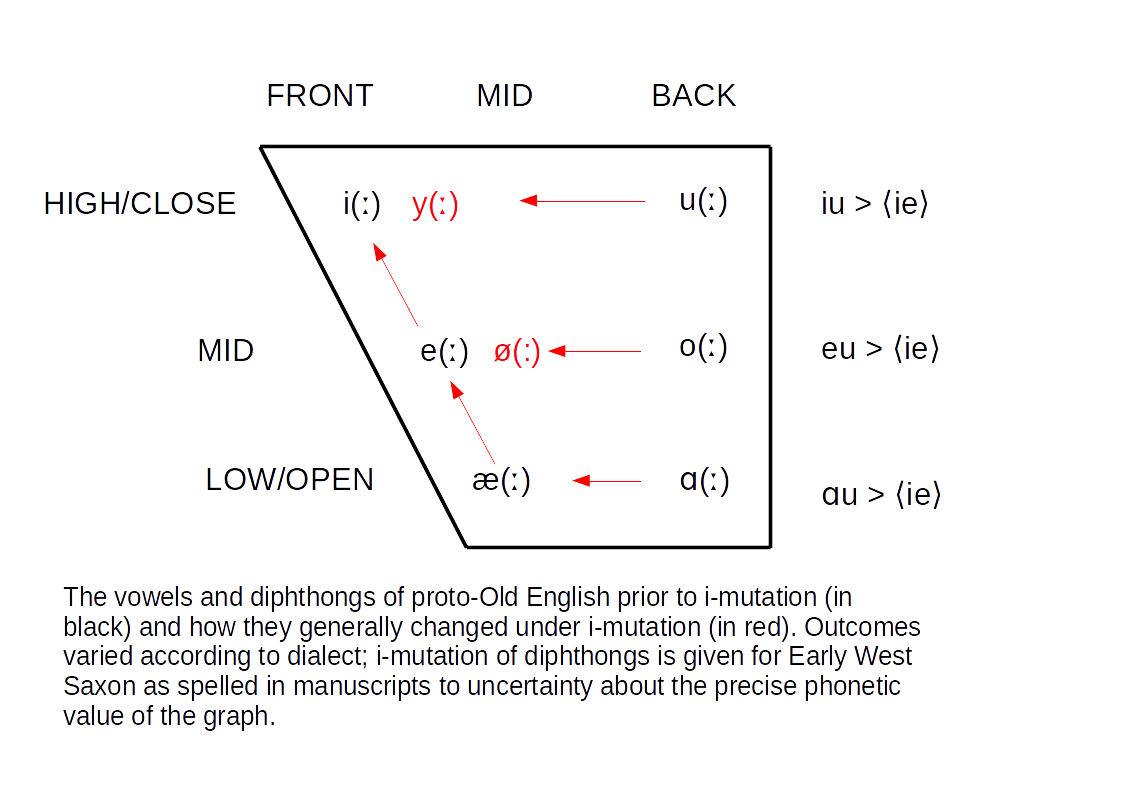
Development of Old English vowels under i-mutation.

Like most other Germanic languages, Old English underwent a process known as i-mutation or i-umlaut. This involved the fronting or raising of vowels under the influence of /i(ː)/ or /j/ in the following syllable. Among its effects were the new front rounded vowels /y(ː), ø(ː)/, and likely the diphthong /iy/ (see above). The original following /i(ː)/ or /j/ that triggered the umlaut was often lost at a later stage. The umlaut is responsible for such modern English forms as men, feet, mice (compare the singulars man, foot, mouse), elder, eldest (compare old), fill (compare full), length (compare long), etc.

For details of the changes, see Germanic umlaut, and particularly the section on i-mutation in Old English.

=== Medial syncopation ===
In medial syllables, short low and mid vowels (/a, æ, e/) are deleted in all open syllables.

Short high vowels (/i, u/) are deleted in open syllables following a long syllable, but usually remain following a short syllable; this is part of the process of high vowel loss.

Syncopation of low/mid vowels occurred after i-mutation and before high vowel loss. An example demonstrating that it occurred after i-mutation is mæġden "maiden":

| Stage | Process | Result |
|---|---|---|
| Proto-Germanic | Original form | *magadīną |
| | Final a-loss | *magadīn |
| Anglo-Frisian | Anglo-Frisian brightening | *mægædīn |
| | Palatalization | *mæġædīn |
| | I-mutation | *mæġedīn |
| | Medial syncopation | *mæġdīn |
| Old English | Unstressed vowel reduction | mæġden |

If the syncopation of short low/mid vowels had occurred before i-mutation, the result in Old English would be **meġden.

An example showing that syncopation occurred before high vowel loss is sāw(o)l "soul":

- PG *saiwalō > *sāwalu > *sāwlu (medial syncopation) > sāwl "soul". (By-form sāwol is due to vowel epenthesis.)

Had it occurred after high vowel loss, the result in Old English would be **sāwlu.

=== High vowel loss ===
In an unstressed open syllable, /i/ and /u/ (including final /-u/ from Proto-Germanic *-ō) were lost when following a long syllable (i.e. one with a long vowel or diphthong, or followed by two consonants), but not when following a short syllable (i.e. one with a short vowel followed by a single consonant). This took place in two types of contexts:

1. Absolutely word-final
2. In a medial open syllable

Word-final

High-vowel loss caused many paradigms to split depending on the length of the root syllable, with -u or -e (from *-i) appearing after short but not long syllables. For example,

- feminine ō-stem nouns in the nom. sg.: PG *gebō > OE ġiefu "gift" but PG *laizō > OE lār "teaching";
- neuter a-stem nouns in the nom./acc. pl.: PG *skipō > OE scipu "ships" but PG *wurdō > OE word "words";
- masculine i-stem nouns in the nom./acc. sg.: PG *winiz > OE wine "friend" but PG *gastiz > OE ġiest "guest";
- u-stem nouns in the nom./acc. sg.: PG *sunuz > OE sunu "son" but PG *handuz > OE hand "hand";
- strong adjectives in the feminine nom. sg. and neuter nom./acc. pl.: PG *tilō > OE tilu "good (fem. nom. sg., neut. nom./acc. pl.)" but PG *gōdō > OE gōd "good (fem. nom. sg., neut. nom./acc. pl.)";
- weak class 1 imperatives: OE freme "perform!" vs. hīer "hear!" (PG stems *frami- and *hauzi-, respectively; it's unclear if the imperatives ended in *-i or *-ī).

This loss affected the plural of root nouns, e.g. PrePG *pōdes > PG *fōtiz > *fø̄ti > OE fēt "feet (nom.)". All such nouns had long-syllable stems, and so all were without ending in the plural, with the plural marked only by i-mutation.

Two-syllable nouns consisting of two short syllables were treated as if they had a single long syllable — a type of equivalence found elsewhere in the early Germanic languages, e.g. in the handling of Sievers' law in Proto-Norse, as well as in the metric rules of Germanic alliterative poetry. Hence, final high vowels are dropped. However, in a two-syllable noun consisting of a long first syllable, the length of the second syllable determines whether the high vowel is dropped. Examples (all are neuter nouns):

- Short-short: werod "troop", pl. werod (treated as equivalent to a single long syllable, or more correctly as a single long foot)
- Short-long: færeld "journey", pl. færeld
- Long-short: hēafod "head", pl. hēafdu (from * hēafodu)
- Long-long: īsern "iron", pl. īsern

Note also the following apparent exceptions:

- OE wītu "punishments" (pl. of wīte) < PG *wītijō;
- OE rīċ(i)u "kingdoms" (pl. of rīċe) < PG *rīkijō;
- OE wildu "wild" (fem. of wilde) < PG *wildijō;
- OE strengþu "strength" < PG *strangiþō.

In reality, these aren't exceptions because at the time of high-vowel loss the words had the same two-syllable long-short root structure as hēafod (see above).

As a result, high-vowel loss must have occurred after i-mutation but before the loss of internal -(i)j-, which occurred shortly after i-mutation.

Word-medial

Paradigm split also occurred medially as a result of high-vowel loss, e.g. in the past tense forms of Class I weak forms:

- PG *dōmidē > OE dēmde "(he) judged"
- PG *framidē > OE fremede "(he) did, performed (a duty)"

Normally, syncopation (i.e. vowel loss) does not occur in closed syllables, e.g. Englisċe "English", ǣresta "earliest", sċēawunge "a showing, inspection" (each word with an inflected ending following it). However, syncopation passes its usual limits in certain West Saxon verbal and adjectival forms, e.g. the present tense of strong verbs (birst "(you) carry" < PG *beris-tu, birþ "(he) carries" < PG *beriþ, similarly dēmst, dēmþ "(you) judge, (he) judges") and comparative adjectives (ġinġsta "youngest" < PG * jungistô, similarly strenġsta "strongest", lǣsta "least" < *lǣsesta < PG *laisistô).

When both medial and final high-vowel loss can operate in a single word, medial but not final loss occurs:

- PG *strangiþō > WG *strangiþu > *strengþu "strength";
- PG *haubudō > WG *haubudu > * hēafdu "heads".

This implies that final high-vowel loss must precede medial high-vowel loss; else the result would be **strengþ, hēafd.

=== Loss of -(i)j- ===
Internal -j- and its Sievers' law variant -ij-, when they still remained in an internal syllable, were lost just after high-vowel loss, but only after a long syllable. Hence:

- PG **wītijō > WG *wītiju > OE wītu "punishments" (if -ij- were lost before high-vowel loss, the result would be **wīt);
- PG **dōmijaną > *dø̄mijan (after i-mutation) > OE dēman "to judge" (cf. NE deem);
- PG *satjaną > WG *sattjaną > *sættjaną (after Anglo-Frisian brightening) > *settjan (after i-mutation) > OE settan "to set".

Note that in Proto-Germanic, the non-Sievers'-law variant -j- occurred only after short syllables, but due to West Germanic gemination, a consonant directly preceding the -j- was doubled, creating a long syllable. West Germanic gemination didn't apply to /r/, leaving a short syllable, and hence /j/ wasn't lost in such circumstances:

- PG **arjaną > OE erian "to plow".

By Sievers' law, the variant /ij/ occurred only after long syllables, and thus was always lost when it was still word-internal at this point.

When -j- and -ij- became word-final after loss of a following vowel or vowel+/z/, they were converted into -i and -ī, respectively. The former was affected by high-vowel loss, surfacing as -e when not deleted (i.e. after /r/), while the latter always surfaces as -e:

- PG **kunją > WG *kunnją > * kunni > * •kynni > OE cynn "kin, family, kind";
- PG **harjaz > WG *harja (West Germanic gemination didn't apply to /r/) > * hari > * heri > OE here "army";
- PG **wītiją > *wītī > OE wīte "punishment".

It is possible that loss of medial -j- occurred slightly earlier than loss of -ij-, and in particular before high-vowel loss. This appears to be necessary to explain short -jō stem words like nytt "use":

- PG **nutjō > WG *nuttju > *nyttju (by i-mutation) > *nyttu (by j-loss) > OE nytt by high-vowel deletion).

If high-vowel deletion occurred first, the result would presumably be an unattested **nytte.

A similar loss of -(i)j- occurred in the other West Germanic languages, although after the earliest records of those languages (especially Old Saxon, which still has written settian, hēliand corresponding to Old English settan "to set", hǣlend "savior"). Some details are different, as the form kunni with retained -i is found in Old Saxon, Old Dutch and Old High German (but note Old Frisian kenn, kin).

This did not affect the new /j/ (< /ʝ/) formed from palatalisation of PG */ɣ/, suggesting that it was still a palatal fricative at the time of the change. For example, PG **wrōgijaną > early OE */ˈwrøːʝijan/ > OE wrēġan (/ˈwreːjan/).

=== Back mutation ===
Back mutation (sometimes back umlaut, guttural umlaut, u-umlaut, or velar umlaut) is a change that took place in late prehistoric Old English and caused short e, i and sometimes a to break into a diphthong (eo, io, ea respectively, similar to breaking) when a back vowel (u, o, ō, a) occurred in the following syllable. Examples:

- seofon "seven" < *sebun (cf. Gothic sibun)
- heol(o)stor "hiding place, cover" (cf. English holster) < earlier *helustr < *hulestr < *hulistrą (cf. Gothic hulistr)
- eofor "boar" < * *eburaz (cf. Old High German ebur)
- heorot "hart" < *herutaz (cf. Old High German *hiruz)
- mioluc, meoluc "milk" < *melukz (cf. Gothic *miluks)
- liofast, leofast "you (sg.) live" < *libast
- ealu "ale" < *aluþ

Note that io turned into eo in Early West Saxon and late Anglian.

A number of restrictions governed whether back mutation took place:

- Generally it only took place when a single consonant followed the vowel being broken.
- In the standard West Saxon dialect, back mutation only took place before labials (f, b, w) and liquids (l, r). In the Anglian dialect, it took place before all consonants except c, g (Anglian meodu "mead", eosol "donkey" vs. West Saxon medu, esol). In the Kentish dialect, it took place before all consonants (Kentish breogo "price" vs. West Saxon, Anglian bregu, brego).
- Back mutation of a normally took place only in the Mercian subdialect of the Anglian dialect. Standard ealu "ale" is a borrowing from Mercian. Similar borrowings are poetic beadu "battle" and eafora "son, heir", cf. Gothic afar (many poetic words were borrowed from Mercian). On the other hand, standard bealu "evil" (arch. bale) and bearu "grove" owe their ea to breaking — their forms at the time of breaking were *balwą, *barwaz, and the genitive singulars in Old English are bealwes, bearwes.

=== Anglian smoothing ===
In the Anglian (i.e. Mercian and Northumbrian) dialects of Old English, a process called smoothing undid many of the effects of breaking. In particular, before a velar /h, ɡ, k/ or before an /r/ or /l/ followed by a velar, diphthongs were reduced to monophthongs. Note that the context for smoothing is similar to the context for the earlier process of breaking that produced many of the diphthongs in the first place. In particular:

- ea > æ before a velar, e before /r/ + velar
- ēa > ē
- eo > e
- ēo > ē
- io > i
- īo > ī

This change preceded h-loss and vowel assimilation.

The diphthongs ie and īe did not exist in Anglian (or in fact in any dialect other than West Saxon).

=== H-loss ===
In the same contexts where the voiceless fricatives /f, θ, s/ become voiced, i.e. between vowels and between a voiced consonant and a vowel, /h/ is lost, with compensatory lengthening of the preceding vowel if it is short. This occurs after breaking; hence breaking before /rh/ and /lh/ takes place regardless of whether the /h/ is lost by this rule. An unstressed short vowel is absorbed into the preceding long vowel.

Examples:

- sċōs "shoe" (gen.) < /ˈʃoː.es/ < /ˈʃoːhes/, cf. sċōh (nom.)
- fēos "money" (gen.) < /ˈfeːo.es/ < /ˈfeohes/ < /ˈfehes/, cf. feoh (nom.)
- wēalas "foreigners, Welsh people" < /ˈwæalhas/ < /ˈwælhas/, cf. wealh (sing.)

=== Vowel assimilation ===
Two vowels that occurred in hiatus (i.e. next to each other, with no consonant separating) collapsed into a single long vowel. Many occurrences were due to h-loss, but some came from other sources, e.g. loss of /j/ or /w/ after a front vowel. (Loss of /j/ occurred early, in Proto-Germanic times. Loss of /w/ occurred later, after i-umlaut.) If the first vowel was e or i (long or short), and the second vowel was a back vowel, a diphthong resulted. Examples:

- sċōs "shoe" (gen.) < Proto-Germanic *skōhas (see under h-loss)
- fēos "money" (gen.) < Proto-Germanic *fehas (see under h-loss)
- frēond "friend" < *frīond < Proto-Germanic *frijōndz (two syllables, cf. Gothic frijōnds)
- sǣm "sea" (dat. pl.) < *sǣum < *sǣwum < *sǣwimiz < Proto-Germanic *saiwimiz

=== Palatal umlaut ===
Palatal umlaut is a process whereby short e, eo, io appear as i (occasionally ie) before final ht, hs, hþ. Examples:

- riht "right" (cf. German recht)
- cniht "boy" (mod. knight) (cf. German Knecht)
- siex "six" (cf. German sechs)
- briht, bryht "bright" (cf. non-metathesized Old English forms beorht, (Anglian) berht, Dutch brecht)
- hlihþ "(he) laughs" < hlehþ < *hlæhiþ + i-mutation < Proto-Germanic *hlahiþ (cf. hliehhan "to laugh" < Proto-Germanic *hlahjaną)

=== Unstressed vowel reduction ===
There was steady vowel reduction in unstressed syllables, in a number of stages:

1. In West Germanic times, absolutely final non-nasal *-ō (but not e.g. *-ōz, *-ô or *-ǭ) was raised and shortened to -u.
2. All other final-syllable *ō were lowered to *ā. By Anglo-Frisian brightening, these ended up as *-ǣ (later -æ). Overlong *ô, as well as *ō in medial syllables, were unaffected.
3. Although vowel nasality persisted at least up through Anglo-Frisian times and likely through the time of a-restoration, it was eventually lost (in stressed as well as unstressed syllables), with non-nasal vowels the result.
4. Medial syncopation deleted word-medial short unstressed low/mid vowels in open syllables.
5. High-vowel loss deleted short unstressed high vowels /i/ and /u/ in open syllables following a long syllable, whether word-final or word-medial.
6. All unstressed long and overlong vowels were shortened, with remaining long ō, ô shortening to a.
7. This produced five final-syllable short vowels, which remained into early documented Old English (back a, u; front æ, e, i). By the time of the majority of Old English documents, however, all three front short vowels had merged into e.
8. Absolutely final -u tends to be written u (sometimes o); but before a consonant, it is normally written o (e.g. seovon "seven" < PG *sibun). Exceptions are the endings -ung, -(s)um, -uc and when the root has u in it, e.g. duguþ "band of warriors; prosperity".
9. Final-syllable e is written i in the endings -ing, -iġ, -(l)iċ, -isċ, -iht.

A table showing these developments in more detail is found in Proto-Germanic: Later developments.

=== Vowel lengthening ===
In the late 8th or early 9th century, short stressed vowels were lengthened before certain groups of consonants: ld, mb, nd, ng, rd, rl, rn, rs+vowel. Some of the lengthened vowels would be shortened again by or during the Middle English period; this applied particularly before the clusters beginning r. Examples of words in which the effect of lengthening has been preserved are:

- ċild > ċīld > mod. child /aɪ/ (but lengthening did not occur if another consonant immediately followed, as in ċildru, giving modern children with /ɪ/)
- ald > āld > mod. old /oʊ/ (but lengthening did not occur in the antepenultimate syllable, as in aldormann, giving modern alderman, with an originally short ⟨a⟩)
- climban > clīmban > mod. climb /aɪ/
- grund > grūnd > mod. ground /aʊ/
- lang > lāng > mod. long (⟨ā⟩ went regularly to ⟨ō⟩ but was shortened in this position in late Middle English; compare Scots lang where the shortening occurred first)

== Diphthong changes ==
In Early West Saxon io and īo were merged into eo and ēo. Also, the Early West Saxon diphthongs ie and īe developed into what is known as "unstable i", merging into /y(ː)/ in Late West Saxon. For further detail, see Old English diphthongs. All of the remaining Old English diphthongs were monophthongised in the early Middle English period: see Middle English stressed vowel changes.

== Dialects ==
Old English dialects and their sound changes
| | West Saxon | Northumbrian | Mercian | Kentish |
|---|---|---|---|---|
| Proto-Germanic ǣ > ē | no | yes | | |
| palatal diphthongization | yes | limited | no | no |
| retraction æ > a / rC | no | yes | no | no |
| smoothing | no | yes | yes | no |
| a > o / N | no | yes | yes | no |
| back mutation | limited | | | yes |
| æ > e | no | no | yes | yes |
| Anglo-Frisian ǣ > ē | no | no | no | yes |
| y, ȳ > e, ē | no | no | no | yes |

Old English had four major dialect groups: West Saxon, Mercian, Northumbrian, and Kentish. West Saxon and Kentish occurred in the south, approximately to the south of the River Thames. Mercian constituted the middle section of the country, divided from the southern dialects by the Thames and from Northumbrian by the Humber and Mersey rivers. Northumbrian encompassed the area between the Humber and the Firth of Forth (including what is now southeastern Scotland but was once part of the Kingdom of Northumbria). In the south, the easternmost portion was Kentish and everywhere else was West Saxon. Mercian and Northumbrian are often grouped together as "Anglian".

The biggest differences occurred between West Saxon and the other groups. The differences occurred mostly in the front vowels, and particularly the diphthongs. (However, Northumbrian was distinguished from the rest by much less palatalisation. Forms in Modern English with hard /k/ and /ɡ/ where a palatalised sound would be expected from Old English are due either to Northumbrian influence or to direct borrowing from Scandinavian. Note that, in fact, the lack of palatalisation in Northumbrian was probably due to heavy Scandinavian influence.)

The early history of Kentish was similar to Anglian, but sometime around the ninth century all of the front vowels æ, e, y (long and short) merged into e (long and short). The further discussion concerns the differences between Anglian and West Saxon, with the understanding that Kentish, other than where noted, can be derived from Anglian by front-vowel merger. The primary differences were:

- Original (post Anglo-Frisian brightening) ǣ was raised to ē in Anglian but remained in West Saxon. This occurred before other changes such as breaking, and did not affect ǣ caused by i-umlaut of ā. Hence, e.g., dǣlan "to divide" < *dailijan appears the same in both dialects, but West Saxon slǣpan "to sleep" appears as slēpan in Anglian. (This variation remains represented in the spelling of "deal" < dǣlan vs. "sleep" < Anglian slēpan.)
- The West Saxon vowels ie/īe, caused by i-umlaut of long and short ea, eo, io, did not appear in Anglian. Instead, i-umlaut of ea and rare eo is spelled e, and i-umlaut of io remains as io.
- Breaking of short /æ/ to ea did not happen in Anglian before /l/ and a consonant; instead, the vowel was retracted to /a/. When mutated by i-umlaut, it appears again as æ (vs. West Saxon ie). Hence, Anglian cald "cold" vs. West Saxon ċeald.
- Merger of eo and io (long and short) occurred early in West Saxon, but much later in Anglian.
- Many instances of diphthongs in Anglian, including the majority of cases caused by breaking, were turned back into monophthongs again by the process of "Anglian smoothing", which occurred before c, h, g, alone or preceded by r or l. This accounts for some of the most noticeable differences between standard (i.e. West Saxon) Old English and Modern English spelling. E.g. ēage "eye" became ēge in Anglian; nēah "near" became Anglian nēh, later raised to nīh in the transition to Middle English by raising of ē before h (hence "nigh" in Modern English); nēahst "nearest" become Anglian nēhst, shortened to nehst in late Old English by vowel-shortening before three consonants (hence "next" in Modern English).

As mentioned above, Modern English derives mostly from the Anglian dialect rather than the standard West Saxon dialect of Old English. However, since London sits on the Thames near the boundary of the Anglian, West Saxon, and Kentish dialects, some West Saxon and Kentish forms have entered Modern English. For example, "bury" has its spelling derived from West Saxon and its pronunciation from Kentish (see below).

The Northumbrian dialect, which was spoken as far north as Edinburgh, survives as the Scots language spoken in Scotland and parts of Northern Ireland. The distinguishing feature of Northumbrian, the lack of palatalisation of velars, is still evident in doublets between Scots and Modern English such as kirk / "church", brig / "bridge", kist / "chest", yeuk / "itch" (OE ġyċċan < PGmc jukjaną). (However, most of the phonetic differences between Scots and Modern English postdate the Old English period: see Phonological history of Scots for more details.)

== Summary of vowel developments ==
NOTE: Another version of this table is available at Phonological history of English#Development of Old English vowels. This covers the same changes from a more diachronic perspective. It includes less information on the specific differences between the Anglian and West Saxon dialects of Old English, but includes much more information on the Proto-Indo-European changes leading up to the vowels below, and the Middle English vowels that resulted from them.

NOTE: This table only describes the changes in accented syllables. Vowel changes in unaccented syllables were very different and much more extensive. In general, long vowels were reduced to short vowels (and sometimes deleted entirely) and short vowels were very often deleted. All remaining vowels were reduced to only the vowels /u/, /a/ and /e/, and sometimes /o/. (/o/ also sometimes appears as a variant of unstressed /u/.)

| West Germanic | Condition | Process | Old English | | Examples |
| West Germanic | Condition | Process | | i-umlaut | Examples |
|---|---|---|---|---|---|
| *a | | Anglo-Frisian brightening | æ | e | *dagaz > dæġ "day"; *fastaz > fæst "fast (firm)"; *batizǫ̂ > betera "better"; *taljaną > tellan "to tell" |
| *a | +n,m | | a,o | e | *namǫ̂ > nama "name"; *langaz > lang, long "long"; *mannz, manniz > man, mon "man", plur. men "men" |
| *a | +mf,nþ,ns | Ingvaeonic nasal spirant law | ō | ē | *samftijaz, samftô > sēfte, *sōfta >! sōfte "soft"; *tanþs, tanþiz > tōþ, plur. tēþ "tooth"; *gans, gansiz > gōs "goose", plur. gēs "geese" |
| *a | (West Saxon) +h,rC,lC | breaking | ea | ie | *aldaz, aldizǫ̂ > eald "old", ieldra "older" (cf. "elder"); *armaz > earm "arm"; Lat. arca > earc "arc"; *darniją > dierne "secret"; *ahtau > eahta "eight" |
| *a | (Anglian) +h | breaking, Anglian smoothing | æ | e | *ahtau > æhta "eight" |
| *a | (Anglian) +lC | retraction | a | æ | *aldaz, aldizǫ̂ > ald "old", ældra "older" (cf. "elder") |
| *a | (Anglian) +rc,rg,rh | breaking, Anglian smoothing | e | e | Lat. arca > erc "arc" |
| *a | (Anglian) +rC (C not c,g,h) | breaking | ea | e | *armaz > earm "arm"; *darniją > derne "secret" |
| *a | (West Saxon) +hV,hr,hl | breaking, h-loss | ēa | īe | *slahaną > slēan "to slay"; *stahliją > stīele "steel" |
| *a | (Anglian) +hV,hr,hl | breaking, Anglian smoothing, h-loss | ēa | ē | *slahaną, -iþi > slēan "to slay, 3rd sing. pres. indic. slēþ "slays"; *stahliją > stēle "steel" |
| *a | (West Saxon) k,g,j+ | palatal diphthongization | ea | ie | Lat. castra > ċeaster "town, fortress" (cf. names in "-caster, -chester"); *gastiz > ġiest "guest" |
| *a | before a,o,u (Note: The process of a-restoration, as described here, reversed the previous process of Anglo-Frisian brightening, leaving an /a/. However, it was blocked when an /i/ or /j/ followed in the next syllable; instead, /a/ was converted to /æ/ by Anglo-Frisian brightening, and then umlauted to /e/. This accounts for the outcome of PGmc *talō > talu "tale" vs. the related PGmc *taljaną > tellan "to tell". However, in some instances when a-restoration was blocked, the /æ/ that remained from Anglo-Frisian brightening was still reverted to /a/ by analogy with related words where a-restoration did apply; this /a/ was then umlauted to /æ/. This happened especially in verbs when some forms (e.g. the third-person singular present indicative) had umlaut, and other forms (e.g. the infinitive) did not; for example, PGmc *bakaną > OE bacan "to bake" vs. PG *bakiþi > OE bæcþ "(he) bakes". This accounts for the "(by analogy)" notation in the i-umlaut column. The following diagrams show the processes involved in more detail: No analogy: Step / "tale" / "to tell" / Reason; 1 / *talō / *taljaną / original forms; 2 / *talu / *talljan / after various changes, irrelevant here (e.g. West Germanic gemination); 3 / *tælu / *tælljan / Anglo-Frisian brightening; 4 / *talu / *tælljan / a-restoration; 5 / *talu / *tælljan / unaffected by analogy; 6 / *talu / *telljan / i-mutation; 7 / talu / tellan / after further changes, irrelevant here; Analogy: Step / "to bake" / "(he) bakes" / Reason; 1 / *bakaną / *bakiþi / original forms; 2 / *bakan / *bakiþ / after various changes, irrelevant here; 3 / *bækan / *bækiþ / Anglo-Frisian brightening; 4 / *bakan / *bækiþ / a-restoration; 5 / *bakan / *bakiþ / by analogy with the infinitive; 6 / *bakan / *bækiþ / i-mutation; 7 / bacan / bæcþ / after further changes, irrelevant here; Analogy took place between related forms of a single lexical item, e.g. different forms of the same verb or noun. It generally did not take place between related lexical items derived from the same root, e.g. between talu "tale" and tellan "to tell".) | a-restoration | a | (by analogy) æ | plur. *dagôs > dagas "days"; *talō > talu "tale"; *bakaną, -iþi > bacan "to bake", 3rd sing. pres. indic. bæcþ "bakes" |
| *a | (mostly non-West-Saxon) before later a,o,u | back mutation | ea | eo (Note: This entry is misleading. Back mutation actually took place after i-mutation; this is why the result of applying both i-mutation and back mutation to a is eo rather than ie, the normal i-mutation of ea. Note also that back mutation applies only when the following syllable contains a, o, u, while i-mutation applies only when the following syllable contains i, j; hence you would not expect both back mutation and i-mutation to apply in a single word. All instances in which this occurs had one suffix substituted for another between the operation of the two processes. For example: Latin asellum "donkey" > Proto-Germanic *asilu (replacement of Latin diminutive suffix -ell- with similar Proto-Germanic diminutive suffix *-il) > *æsil (a-fronting) > *esil (i-mutation) > *esel (a normal change in unstressed syllables) > esol (substitution of more common -ol for less common -el) > eosol (back mutation); Proto-Germanic *awī "ewe" > *awi (vowel reduction in unstressed syllables) > *ewi (i-mutation) > ewu (feminine -i disappeared in prehistoric Old English and was replaced with -u; a similar change occurred in e.g. menigu "multitude", cf. Gothic managei) > eowu (back mutation)) | *alu > ealu "ale"; *awī > eowu "ewe", *asiluz > non-West-Saxon eosol "donkey" |
| *a | before hs,ht,hþ + final -iz | palatal umlaut | N/A | i (occ. ie) | *nahtiz > nieht > niht "night" |
| *e (Note: Proto-Indo-European /e/ was already mutated to /i/ in Proto-Germanic in two contexts: When occurring before /n/ plus consonant, and when occurring before /i/ or /j/. The more general i-mutation that applied to all vowels in Old English is a separate process that occurred many centuries later, although it had the same effect on /e/. (Note that due to this earlier change there were few instances of /e/ that could be affected by Old English i-mutation. For this reason, the i-mutations of /e/ are listed in parens, e.g. (i), to indicate that the given results are not due directly to i-mutation of /e/, but to i-mutation of /i/ or of some vowel derived from it, e.g. io.) This is also why the Proto-West-Germanic form of hierde "shepherd" appears already as *hirdijaz with /i/ in the root even though it's clearly related to heord "herd" (Proto-West-Germanic *herdō). It is also why there's no entry for "+mf,nþ,ns" under /e/ even though it occurs for all other vowels. Furthermore, describing i as the i-mutation of e, or ie as the i-mutation of eo, is misleading at best. In fact, as just described, e was not mutated to i by i-mutation, but rather in an i-mutation environment i already appeared due to the earlier mutation of /e/ to /i/. Similarly, eo from earlier /e/ in a "breaking" environment was not mutated to ie by i-mutation. In this case again, /i/ already appeared in the i-mutation environment, which was broken to io due to the "breaking" environment it was in, and this io was then mutated to ie by i-mutation. Note further that the breaking environments for /i/ were more restrictive than those for /e/. Hence it's possible for post-breaking non-umlaut-context eo to correspond to umlaut-context i rather than io (e.g. before lh or lc), and therefore for a post-umlaut alternation between eo and i to exist. Presumably, these anomalous alternations were mostly eliminated by analogy.) | | | e | N/A | *etaną > etan "to eat" |
| *e | +m | | i | N/A | *nemaną > niman "to take" |
| *e | (West Saxon) +h,rC,lc,lh,wV | breaking | eo | N/A | *fehtaną > feohtan "to fight"; *berkaną > beorcan "to bark"; *werþaną > weorðan "to become" |
| *e | (Anglian) +h,rc,rg,rh | breaking, Anglian smoothing | e | N/A | *fehtaną > fehtan "to fight"; *berkaną > bercan "to bark" |
| *e | (Anglian) +rC (C not c,g,h); lc,lh,wV | breaking | eo | N/A | *werþaną > weorðan "to become" |
| *e | +hV,hr,hl | breaking, (Anglian smoothing,) h-loss | ēo | N/A | *sehwaną > sēon "to see" |
| *e | + late final hs,ht,hþ | palatal umlaut | i (occ. ie) | N/A | *sehs > siex "six"; *rehtaz > riht "right" |
| *e | (West Saxon) k,g,j+ | palatal diphthongization | ie | N/A | *skeraną > sċieran "shear" |
| *i | | | i | i | *fiską > fisċ "fish"; *itiþi > 3rd sing. pres. indic. iteþ "eats"; *nimiþi > 3rd sing. pres. indic. nimeþ "takes"; *skiriþi > 3rd sing. pres. indic. sċirþ "shears" |
| *i | + mf,nþ,ns | Ingvaeonic nasal spirant law | ī | ī | *fimf > fīf "five" |
| *i | (West Saxon) +h,rC | breaking | io > eo | ie | *Pihtôs > Piohtas, Peohtas "Picts"; *lirnōjaną > liornian, leornian "to learn"; *hirdijaz > hierde "shepherd"; *wirþiþi > 3rd sing. pres. indic. wierþ "becomes" |
| *i | (Anglian) +h,rc,rg,rh | breaking, Anglian smoothing | i | i | *stihtōjaną > stihtian "to establish" |
| *i | (Anglian) +rC (C not c,g,h) | breaking | io > eo | i | *a + firrijaną > afirran "to remove" (cf. feorr "far") |
| *i | (West Saxon) +hV,hr,hl | breaking, h-loss | īo > ēo | īe | *twihōjaną > twīoġan, twēon "to doubt" |
| *i | (Anglian) +hV,hr,hl | breaking, Anglian smoothing, h-loss | īo > ēo | ī | *twihōjaną > twīoġan, twēon "to doubt"; *sihwiþi > 3rd sing. pres. indic. sīþ "sees" |
| *i | before w | breaking | io > eo | i | *nīwalaz > neowol "prostrate"; *spīwiz > spiwe "vomiting" |
| *i | before a,o,u | back mutation | i (io, eo) | N/A | *miluks > mioluc,meolc "milk" |
| *u | | | u | y | *sunuz > sunu "son"; *kumaną, -iþi > cuman "to come", 3rd sing. pres. indic. cymþ "comes"; *guldijaną > gyldan "to gild" |
| *u | + mf,nþ,ns | Ingvaeonic nasal spirant law | ū | ȳ | *munþs > mūþ "mouth"; *wunskijaną > wȳsċan "wish" |
| *u | before non-nasal + a,e,o (Note: A very similar process to what is described in note A resulted in the umlaut of /o/ sometimes appearing as /y/ (the "normal" outcome), and sometimes as /e/ (by analogy). Just like a-restoration, a-mutation (which lowered /u/ to /o/ before /a, e, o/) was blocked by a following /i/ or /j/, and the /u/ that was left over was sometimes changed into /o/ by analogy, and sometimes not changed.) | a-mutation | o | (by analogy) e | *hurną > horn "horn"; *brukanaz > brocen "broken"; *duhter, duhtriz > dohter "daughter", plur. dehter "daughters" |
| *u | +hV,hr,hl | h-loss | ū | ȳ | *uhumistaz > ȳmest "highest" |
| (*ē >) *ā | | Anglo-Frisian brightening | (West Saxon) ǣ | ǣ | *slāpaną > slǣpan "to sleep", Lat. strāta > strǣt "street"; *dādiz > dǣd "deed" |
| (*ē >) *ā | | Anglo-Frisian brightening | (Anglian) ē | ē | *slāpaną > slēpan "to sleep", Lat. strāta > strēt "street"; *dādiz > dēd "deed"; Lat. cāseus > ċēse "cheese"; *nāhaz, nāhistaz > nēh "near" (cf. "nigh"), superl. nēhst "nearest" (cf. "next") |
| (*ē >) *ā | (West Saxon) k,g,j+ | palatal diphthongization | ēa | īe | *jārō > ġēar "year"; Lat. cāseus > ċīese "cheese" |
| (*ē >) *ā | +n,m | | ō | ē | *mānǫ̂ > mōna "moon"; *kwāniz > kwēn "queen" |
| (*ē >) *ā | (West Saxon) +h | breaking | ēa | īe | *nāhaz, nāhistaz > nēah "near" (cf. "nigh"), superl. nīehst "nearest" (cf. "next") |
| (*ē >) *ā | +w;ga,go,gu;la,lo,lu | a-restoration | ā | ǣ | *knāwaną, -iþi > cnāwan "to know", 3rd sing. pres. indic. cnǣwþ "knows" |
| *ē₂ | | | ē | ē | *mē₂dą > mēd "reward" |
| *ō | | | ō | ē | *fōts, fōtiz > fōt "foot", plur. fēt "feet" |
| *ī | | | ī | ī | *wībą > wīf "wife"; *līhiþi > Anglian 3rd sing. pres. indic. līþ "lends" |
| *ī | (West Saxon) +h | breaking | īo > ēo | īe | *līhaną, -iþi > lēon "to lend", 3rd sing. pres. indic. līehþ "lends" |
| *ū | | | ū | ȳ | *mūs, mūsiz > mūs "mouse", plur. mȳs "mice" |
| *ai | | | ā | ǣ | *stainaz > stān "stone", *kaisaraz > cāsere "emperor", *hwaitiją > hwǣte "wheat" |
| *au | | | ēa | (West Saxon) īe | *auzǭ > ēare "ear"; *hauzijaną > hīeran "to hear"; *hauh, hauhist > hēah "high", superl. hīehst "highest" |
| *au | | | ēa | (Anglian) ē | *auzǭ > ēare "ear"; *hauzijaną > hēran "to hear" |
| *au | (Anglian) +c,g,h;rc,rg,rh;lc,lg,lh | Anglian smoothing | ē | ē | *hauh, hauhist > hēh "high", superl. hēhst "highest" |
| *eu (Note: Proto-Germanic mutation of /e/ to /i/ before /i/ or /j/ also affected /eu/, producing /iu/. In fact, /iu/ occurs only before /i/ or /j/ in the following syllable, and /eu/ never occurs in these circumstances. That is, /iu/ is in fact an allophone of /eu/. It is typically written as /iu/, rather than [iu], because in the later Germanic dialects the reflexes of the sound do in fact become separate phonemes.) | | | ēo | N/A | *deupaz > dēop "deep"; *fleugǭ > flēoge "fly"; *beudaną > bēodan "to command" |
| *eu | (Anglian) +c,g,h;rc,rg,rh;lc,lg,lh | Anglian smoothing | ē | N/A | *fleugǭ > flēge "fly" |
| *iu | | | N/A | (West Saxon) īe | *biudiþi > 3rd sing. pres. indic. bīett "commands"; *liuhtijaną > līehtan "to lighten" |
| *iu | | | N/A | (Anglian) īo | *biudiþi > 3rd sing. pres. indic. bīott "commands" |
| *iu | (Anglian) +c,g,h;rc,rg,rh;lc,lg,lh | Anglian smoothing | N/A | ī | *liuhtijaną > līhtan "to lighten" |

== Changes leading up to Middle and Modern English ==
For a detailed description of the changes between Old English and Middle/Modern English, see the article on the phonological history of English. A summary of the main vowel changes is presented below. Note that the spelling of Modern English largely reflects Middle English pronunciation. Note also that this table presents only the general developments. Many exceptional outcomes occurred in particular environments, e.g. vowels were often lengthened in late Old English before /ld, nd, mb/; vowels changed in complex ways before /r/, throughout the history of English; vowels were diphthongised in Middle English before /h/; new diphthongs arose in Middle English by the combination of vowels with Old English ⟨w⟩, ⟨g⟩ /ɣ/ > /w/, and ⟨ġ⟩ /j/; etc. The only conditional development considered in detail below is Middle English open-syllable lengthening. Note that, in the column on modern spelling, CV means a sequence of a single consonant followed by a vowel.

NOTE: In this table, abbreviations are used as follows:

- OE = Old English
- WS = West Saxon (dialect of Old English)
- ME = Middle English
- NE = Modern English
- GA = General American (generalised U.S. accent of Modern English)
- RP = Received Pronunciation (prestige British accent of Modern English)
- AN = Anglo-Norman
- leng. = lengthened by open-syllable lengthening
- occ. = occasionally
- > = produces by regular sound change
- >! = produces by analogy or irregular change

| Late Old English (Anglian), c. 1000 | Middle English pronunciation, c. 1400 | Modern English spelling, c. 1500 | Early Modern English pronunciation, c. 1600 | Modern English pronunciation, c. 2000 | Source | Example |
|---|---|---|---|---|---|---|
| a; æ; ea; ā+CC; often ǣ+CC,ēa+CC; occ. ē+CC (WS ǣ+CC) | /a/ | a | /a/ | /æ/ | OE a | OE mann > man; OE lamb > lamb; OE sang > sang; OE sacc > sack; OE assa > ass (donkey) |
| a; æ; ea; ā+CC; often ǣ+CC,ēa+CC; occ. ē+CC (WS ǣ+CC) | /a/ | a | /a/ | /æ/ | OE æ | OE fæþm > fathom; OE sæt > sat; OE æt > at; OE mæsse > mass (at church) |
| a; æ; ea; ā+CC; often ǣ+CC,ēa+CC; occ. ē+CC (WS ǣ+CC) | /a/ | a | /a/ | /æ/ | OE ea | OE weax > wax; OE healf > half /hæf/ (GA) |
| a; æ; ea; ā+CC; often ǣ+CC,ēa+CC; occ. ē+CC (WS ǣ+CC) | /a/ | a | /a/ | /æ/ | OE +CC | OE āscian > ask /æsk/ (GA); OE fǣtt > fat; OE lǣstan > to last /læst/ (GA) ; OE blēddre (WS blǣddre) > bladder; OE brēmbel (WS brǣmbel) > bramble |
| a; æ; ea; ā+CC; often ǣ+CC,ēa+CC; occ. ē+CC (WS ǣ+CC) | /a/ | a | /a/ | (w+, not +g,ck,ng,nk) GA /ɑ/, RP /ɒ/ | OE a | OE swan > swan; OE wasċan > to wash; OE wann dark > wan |
| a; æ; ea; ā+CC; often ǣ+CC,ēa+CC; occ. ē+CC (WS ǣ+CC) | /a/ | a | /a/ | (w+, not +g,ck,ng,nk) GA /ɑ/, RP /ɒ/ | OE æ | OE swæþ > swath; OE wæsp > wasp |
| a; æ; ea; ā+CC; often ǣ+CC,ēa+CC; occ. ē+CC (WS ǣ+CC) | /a/ | a | /a/ | (w+, not +g,ck,ng,nk) GA /ɑ/, RP /ɒ/ | OE ea | OE wealwian > to wallow; OE swealwe > swallow (bird) |
| a; æ; ea; ā+CC; often ǣ+CC,ēa+CC; occ. ē+CC (WS ǣ+CC) | /a/ | a | /a/ | (+r) /ar/ > GA /ɑr/, RP /ɑː/ | | OE heard > hard; OE ærc (WS earc) > ark |
| a; æ; ea; ā+CC; often ǣ+CC,ēa+CC; occ. ē+CC (WS ǣ+CC) | /a/ | a | /a/ | (w+ and +r) /ɔr/ > GA /ɔr/, RP /ɔː/ | OE ea | OE swearm > swarm; OE sweart > old poetic swart >! swarthy; OE weardian > to ward; OE wearm > warm; OE wearnian > to warn |
| a; æ; ea; ā+CC; often ǣ+CC,ēa+CC; occ. ē+CC (WS ǣ+CC) | /a/ | a | /a/ | (+lC,l#) /ɔː/ | | OE smæl > small; OE all (WS eall) > all; OE walcian (WS wealcian) to roll > to walk |
| a; æ; ea; ā+CC; often ǣ+CC,ēa+CC; occ. ē+CC (WS ǣ+CC) | /a/ | a | /a/ | (+lm) GA /ɑ/, RP /ɑː/ | | OE ælmesse > alms; Latin palma > OE 'palm > palm |
| a; æ; ea; ā+CC; often ǣ+CC,ēa+CC; occ. ē+CC (WS ǣ+CC) | /a/ | a | /a/ | (RP, often +f,s,th) /ɑː/ | | OE glæs > glass; OE græs > grass; OE pæþ > path; OE æfter > after; OE āscian /ɑːsk/ > to ask; OE lǣstan /lɑːst/ > to last |
| a; æ; ea; ā+CC; often ǣ+CC,ēa+CC; occ. ē+CC (WS ǣ+CC) | (leng.) /aː/ [æː] | aCV | /ɛː/ | /eː/ > /eɪ/ | OE a | OE nama > name; OE nacod > naked; OE bacan > to bake |
| a; æ; ea; ā+CC; often ǣ+CC,ēa+CC; occ. ē+CC (WS ǣ+CC) | (leng.) /aː/ [æː] | aCV | /ɛː/ | /eː/ > /eɪ/ | OE æ | OE æcer > acre; OE hwæl > whale; OE hræfn > raven |
| a; æ; ea; ā+CC; often ǣ+CC,ēa+CC; occ. ē+CC (WS ǣ+CC) | (leng.) /aː/ [æː] | aCV | /ɛː/ | (+r) /eːr/ > GA /ɛr/, RP /ɛə/ | OE a | OE caru > care; OE faran > to fare; OE starian > to stare |
| e; eo; occ. y; ē+CC; ēo+CC; occ. ǣ+CC,ēa+CC | /e/ | e | /ɛ/ | /ɛ/ | OE e | OE helpan > to help; OE elh (WS eolh) > elk; OE tellan > to tell; OE betera > better; OE streċċan > to stretch |
| e; eo; occ. y; ē+CC; ēo+CC; occ. ǣ+CC,ēa+CC | /e/ | e | /ɛ/ | /ɛ/ | OE eo | OE seofon > seven |
| e; eo; occ. y; ē+CC; ēo+CC; occ. ǣ+CC,ēa+CC | /e/ | e | /ɛ/ | /ɛ/ | OE y | OE myriġ > merry; OE byrġan > to bury /ˈbɛri/; OE lyft- weak > left (hand); OE cnyll > knell |
| e; eo; occ. y; ē+CC; ēo+CC; occ. ǣ+CC,ēa+CC | /e/ | e | /ɛ/ | /ɛ/ | OE +CC | OE cēpte > kept; OE mētte > met; OE bēcnan (WS bīecnan) > to beckon; OE clǣnsian > to cleanse; OE flǣsċ > flesh; OE lǣssa > less; OE frēond > friend /frɛnd/; OE þēofþ (WS þīefþ) > theft; OE hēold > held |
| e; eo; occ. y; ē+CC; ēo+CC; occ. ǣ+CC,ēa+CC | /e/ | (+r) ar | /ar/ | GA /ɑr/, RP /ɑː/ | | OE heorte > heart; OE bercan (WS beorcan) > to bark; OE teoru (WS teru) > tar; OE steorra > star |
| e; eo; occ. y; ē+CC; ēo+CC; occ. ǣ+CC,ēa+CC | /e/ | (+r) ar | /ar/ | (w+ and +r) /ɔr/ > GA /ɔr/, RP /ɔː/ | | AN werra > war; AN werbler > to warble |
| e; eo; occ. y; ē+CC; ēo+CC; occ. ǣ+CC,ēa+CC | /e/ | (occ. +r) er | /ɛr/ | /ər/ > GA /ər/, RP /ɜː/ | OE e | OE sterne (WS stierne, styrne) > stern |
| e; eo; occ. y; ē+CC; ēo+CC; occ. ǣ+CC,ēa+CC | /e/ | (occ. +r) er | /ɛr/ | /ər/ > GA /ər/, RP /ɜː/ | OE eo | OE eorl > earl; OE eorþe > earth; OE liornian, leornian > to learn |
| e; eo; occ. y; ē+CC; ēo+CC; occ. ǣ+CC,ēa+CC | /e/ | (occ. +r) er | /ɛr/ | /ər/ > GA /ər/, RP /ɜː/ | OE +CC | OE hērde (WS hīerde) > heard |
| e; eo; occ. y; ē+CC; ēo+CC; occ. ǣ+CC,ēa+CC | (leng.) /ɛː/ | ea,eCV | /eː/ | /iː/, [ɪi] | | OE specan > to speak; OE mete > meat; OE beofor > beaver; OE meotan (WS metan) > to mete /miːt/; OE eotan (WS etan) > to eat; OE meodu (WS medu) > mead; OE yfel > evil |
| e; eo; occ. y; ē+CC; ēo+CC; occ. ǣ+CC,ēa+CC | (leng.) /ɛː/ | ea,eCV | /eː/ | (+r) /iːr/ > GA /ɪr/, RP /ɪə/ | | OE spere > spear; OE mere > mere (lake) |
| e; eo; occ. y; ē+CC; ēo+CC; occ. ǣ+CC,ēa+CC | (leng.) /ɛː/ | ea,eCV | /eː/ | (occ.) /eɪ/ | | OE brecan > to break /breɪk/ |
| e; eo; occ. y; ē+CC; ēo+CC; occ. ǣ+CC,ēa+CC | (leng.) /ɛː/ | ea,eCV | /eː/ | (occ. +r) /eːr/ > GA /ɛr/, RP /ɛə/ | | OE beoran (WS beran) > to bear; OE pere, peru > pear; OE swerian > to swear; OE wer man > were- |
| e; eo; occ. y; ē+CC; ēo+CC; occ. ǣ+CC,ēa+CC | (leng.) /ɛː/ | ea,eCV | /eː/ | (often +th,d,t,v) /ɛ/ | | OE leþer > leather /lɛðɚ/; OE stede > stead; OE weder > weather; OE heofon > heaven; OE hefiġ > heavy |
| i; y; ī+CC,ȳ+CC; occ. ēoc,ēc; occ. ī+CV,ȳ+CV | /i/ | i | /ɪ/ | /ɪ/ | OE i | OE writen > written; OE sittan > to sit; OE fisċ > fish; OE lifer > liver |
| i; y; ī+CC,ȳ+CC; occ. ēoc,ēc; occ. ī+CV,ȳ+CV | /i/ | i | /ɪ/ | /ɪ/ | OE y | OE bryċġ > bridge; OE cyssan > to kiss; OE dyde > did; OE synn > sin; OE gyldan > to gild; OE bysiġ > busy /ˈbɪzi/ |
| i; y; ī+CC,ȳ+CC; occ. ēoc,ēc; occ. ī+CV,ȳ+CV | /i/ | i | /ɪ/ | /ɪ/ | OE +CC | OE wīsdōm > wisdom; OE fīftiġ > fifty; OE wȳsċan > to wish; OE cȳþþ(u) > kith; OE fȳst > fist |
| i; y; ī+CC,ȳ+CC; occ. ēoc,ēc; occ. ī+CV,ȳ+CV | /i/ | i | /ɪ/ | /ɪ/ | OE ȳ+CV,ī+CV | OE ċīcen > chicken; OE lȳtel > little |
| i; y; ī+CC,ȳ+CC; occ. ēoc,ēc; occ. ī+CV,ȳ+CV | /i/ | i | /ɪ/ | /ɪ/ | OE ēoc,ēc | OE sēoc > sick; OE wēoce > wick; OE ēc + nama > ME eke-name >! nickname |
| i; y; ī+CC,ȳ+CC; occ. ēoc,ēc; occ. ī+CV,ȳ+CV | /i/ | i | /ɪ/ | (+r) /ər/ > GA /ər/, RP /ɜː/ | | OE gyrdan > to gird; OE fyrst > first; OE styrian > to stir |
| i; y; ī+CC,ȳ+CC; occ. ēoc,ēc; occ. ī+CV,ȳ+CV | (leng. — occ.) /eː/ | ee | /iː/ | /iː/, [ɪi] | | OE wicu > week; OE pilian > to peel; OE bitela > beetle |
| o; ō+CC | /o/ | o | /ɔ/ | GA /ɑ/, RP /ɒ/ | OE o | OE god > god; OE beġeondan > beyond |
| o; ō+CC | /o/ | o | /ɔ/ | GA /ɑ/, RP /ɒ/ | OE +CC | OE gōdspell > gospel; OE fōddor > fodder; OE fōstrian > to foster |
| o; ō+CC | /o/ | o | /ɔ/ | (GA, +f,s,th,g,ng) /ɔː/ | | OE moþþe > moth; OE cros > cross; OE frost > frost; OE of > off; OE oft > oft; OE sōfte > soft |
| o; ō+CC | /o/ | o | /ɔ/ | (+r) /ɔr/ > GA /ɔr/, RP /ɔː/ | | OE corn > corn; OE storc > storc; OE storm > storm |
| o; ō+CC | (leng.) /ɔː/ | oa,oCV | /oː/ | GA /oʊ/, RP /əʊ/ | | OE fola > foal; OE nosu > nose; OE ofer > over |
| o; ō+CC | (leng.) /ɔː/ | oa,oCV | /oː/ | (+r) /oːr/ > GA /ɔr/, RP /ɔː/ | | OE borian > to bore; OE fore > fore; OE bord > board |
| u; occ. y; ū+CC; w+ e,eo,o,y +r | /u/ | u,o | /ʊ/ | /ʌ/ | OE u | OE bucc > buck /bʌk/; OE lufian > to love /lʌv/; OE uppe > up; OE on bufan > above |
| u; occ. y; ū+CC; w+ e,eo,o,y +r | /u/ | u,o | /ʊ/ | /ʌ/ | OE y | OE myċel > ME muchel >! much; OE blysċan > to blush; OE cyċġel > cudgel; OE clyċċan > to clutch; OE sċytel > shuttle |
| u; occ. y; ū+CC; w+ e,eo,o,y +r | /u/ | u,o | /ʊ/ | /ʌ/ | OE +CC | OE dūst > dust; OE tūsc > tusk; OE rūst > rust |
| u; occ. y; ū+CC; w+ e,eo,o,y +r | /u/ | u,o | /ʊ/ | (b,f,p+ and +l,sh) /ʊ/ | | OE full > full /fʊl/; OE bula > bull; OE bysċ > bush |
| u; occ. y; ū+CC; w+ e,eo,o,y +r | /u/ | u,o | /ʊ/ | (+r) /ər/ > GA /ər/, RP /ɜː/ | OE u | OE spurnan > to spurn |
| u; occ. y; ū+CC; w+ e,eo,o,y +r | /u/ | u,o | /ʊ/ | (+r) /ər/ > GA /ər/, RP /ɜː/ | OE y | OE ċyriċe > church; OE byrþen > burden; OE hyrdel > hurdle |
| u; occ. y; ū+CC; w+ e,eo,o,y +r | /u/ | u,o | /ʊ/ | (+r) /ər/ > GA /ər/, RP /ɜː/ | OE w+,+r | OE word > word; OE werc (WS weorc) > work; OE werold > world; OE wyrm > worm; OE wersa (WS wiersa) > worse; OE weorþ > worth |
| u; occ. y; ū+CC; w+ e,eo,o,y +r | (leng. — occ.) /oː/ | oo | /uː/ | /uː/, [ʊu] | | OE (brȳd)-guma > ME (bride)-gome >! (bride)-groom |
| u; occ. y; ū+CC; w+ e,eo,o,y +r | (leng. — occ.) /oː/ | oo | /uː/ | (+r) /uːr/ > /oːr/ > GA /ɔr/, RP /ɔː/ | | OE duru > door |
| u; occ. y; ū+CC; w+ e,eo,o,y +r | (leng. — occ.) /oː/ | oo | /uː/ | (often +th,d,t) /ʌ/ | | ? |
| u; occ. y; ū+CC; w+ e,eo,o,y +r | (leng. — occ.) /oː/ | oo | /uː/ | (occ. +th,d,t) /ʊ/ | | OE wudu > wood /wʊd/ |
| ā; often a+ld,mb | /ɔː/ | oa,oCV | /oː/ | GA /oʊ/, RP /əʊ/ | OE ā | OE āc > oak; OE hāl > whole |
| ā; often a+ld,mb | /ɔː/ | oa,oCV | /oː/ | GA /oʊ/, RP /əʊ/ | OE +ld,mb | OE camb > comb; OE ald (WS eald) > old; OE haldan (WS healdan) > to hold |
| ā; often a+ld,mb | /ɔː/ | oa,oCV | /oː/ | (+r) /oːr/ > GA /ɔr/, RP /ɔː/ | | OE ār > oar, ore; OE māra > more; OE bār > boar; OE sār > sore |
| ǣ; ēa | /ɛː/ | ea,eCV | /eː/ | /iː/, [ɪi] | OE ǣ | OE hǣlan > to heal /hiːl/; OE hǣtu > heat; OE hwǣte > wheat |
| ǣ; ēa | /ɛː/ | ea,eCV | /eː/ | /iː/, [ɪi] | OE ēa | OE bēatan > to beat /biːt/; OE lēaf > leaf; OE ċēap > cheap |
| ǣ; ēa | /ɛː/ | ea,eCV | /eː/ | (+r) /iːr/ > GA /ɪr/, RP /ɪə/ | | OE rǣran > to rear ; OE ēare > ear; OE sēar > sere; OE sēarian > to sear |
| ǣ; ēa | /ɛː/ | ea,eCV | /eː/ | (occ.) /eɪ/ | | OE grēat > great /greɪt/ |
| ǣ; ēa | /ɛː/ | ea,eCV | /eː/ | (occ. +r) /eːr/ > GA /ɛr/, RP /ɛə/ | | OE ǣr > ere (before) |
| ǣ; ēa | /ɛː/ | ea,eCV | /eː/ | (often +th,d,t) /ɛ/ | OE ǣ | OE brǣþ odor > breath; OE swǣtan > to sweat; OE sprǣdan > to spread |
| ǣ; ēa | /ɛː/ | ea,eCV | /eː/ | (often +th,d,t) /ɛ/ | OE ēa | OE dēad > dead /dɛd/; OE dēaþ death; OE þrēat menace > threat; OE rēad > red; OE dēaf > deaf |
| ē; ēo; often e+ld | /eː/ | ee,ie(nd/ld) | /iː/ | /iː/, [ɪi] | OE ē | OE fēdan > to feed; OE grēdiġ (WS grǣdiġ) > greedy; OE mē > me; OE fēt > feet; OE dēd (WS dǣd) > deed; OE nēdl (WS nǣdl) > needle |
| ē; ēo; often e+ld | /eː/ | ee,ie(nd/ld) | /iː/ | /iː/, [ɪi] | OE ēo | OE dēop deep; OE fēond > fiend; OE betwēonum > between; OE bēon > to be |
| ē; ēo; often e+ld | /eː/ | ee,ie(nd/ld) | /iː/ | /iː/, [ɪi] | OE +ld | OE feld > field; OE ġeldan (WS ġieldan) to pay > to yield |
| ē; ēo; often e+ld | (often +r) /ɛːr/ | ear,erV | /eːr/ | /iːr/ > GA /ɪr/, RP /ɪə/ | OE ē | OE hēr > here; OE hēran (WS hīeran) > to hear; OE fēr (WS fǣr) > fear |
| ē; ēo; often e+ld | (often +r) /ɛːr/ | ear,erV | /eːr/ | /iːr/ > GA /ɪr/, RP /ɪə/ | OE ēo | OE dēore (WS dīere) > dear |
| ē; ēo; often e+ld | (often +r) /ɛːr/ | ear,erV | /eːr/ | (occ.) /eːr/ > GA /ɛr/, RP /ɛə/ | | OE þēr (WS þǣr) > there; OE hwēr (WS hwǣr) > where |
| ē; ēo; often e+ld | (occ. +r) /eːr/ | eer | /iːr/ | /iːr/ > GA /ɪr/, RP /ɪə/ | | OE bēor > beer; OE dēor > deer; OE stēran (WS stīeran) > to steer; OE bēr (WS bǣr) > bier |
| ī; ȳ; often i+ld,mb,nd; often y+ld,mb,nd | /iː/ | i,iCV | /əi/ | /aɪ/ | OE ī | OE rīdan > to ride; OE tīma > time; OE hwīt > white; OE mīn > mine (of me) |
| ī; ȳ; often i+ld,mb,nd; often y+ld,mb,nd | /iː/ | i,iCV | /əi/ | /aɪ/ | OE ȳ | OE mȳs > mice; OE brȳd > bride; OE hȳdan > to hide |
| ī; ȳ; often i+ld,mb,nd; often y+ld,mb,nd | /iː/ | i,iCV | /əi/ | /aɪ/ | OE +ld,mb,nd | OE findan > to find; OE ċild > child; OE climban > to climb; OE mynd > mind |
| ī; ȳ; often i+ld,mb,nd; often y+ld,mb,nd | /iː/ | i,iCV | /əi/ | (+r) /air/ > GA /aɪr/, RP /aɪə/ | | OE fȳr > fire; OE hȳrian > to hire; OE wīr > wire |
| ō; occ. ēo | /oː/ | oo | /uː/ | /uː/, [ʊu] | OE ō | OE mōna > moon; OE sōna > soon; OE fōd > food /fuːd/; OE dōn > to do |
| ō; occ. ēo | /oː/ | oo | /uː/ | /uː/, [ʊu] | OE ēo | OE ċēosan > to choose; OE sċēotan > to shoot |
| ō; occ. ēo | /oː/ | oo | /uː/ | (+r) /uːr/ > /oːr/ > GA /ɔr/, RP /ɔː/ | | OE flōr > floor; OE mōr > moor |
| ō; occ. ēo | /oː/ | oo | /uː/ | (occ. +th,d,v) /ʌ/ | | OE blōd > blood /blʌd/; OE mōdor > mother /mʌðə(r)/; OE glōf > glove /glʌv/ |
| ō; occ. ēo | /oː/ | oo | /uː/ | (often +th,d,t,k) /ʊ/ | | OE gōd > good /gʊd/; OE bōc > book /bʊk/; OE lōcian > to look /lʊk/; OE fōt > foot /fʊt/ |
| ū; often u+nd | /uː/ | ou | /əu/ | /aʊ/ | OE ū | OE mūs > mouse; OE ūt, ūte > out; OE hlūd > loud |
| ū; often u+nd | /uː/ | ou | /əu/ | /aʊ/ | OE +nd | OE ġefunden > found; OE hund > hound; OE ġesund > sound (safe) |
| ū; often u+nd | /uː/ | ou | /əu/ | (+r) /aur/ > GA /aʊr/, RP /aʊə/ | OE | OE ūre > our; OE sċūr > shower; OE sūr > sour |
| ū; often u+nd | /uː/ | ou | /əu/ | (occ. +t) /ʌ/ | | OE būtan > but; OE strūtian > ME strouten > to strut |

Note that the Modern English vowel usually spelled ⟨au⟩ (British /ɔː/, American /ɔ/) does not appear in the above chart. Its main source is late Middle English /au/, which come from various sources: Old English ⟨aw⟩ and ⟨ag⟩ ("claw" < clawu, "law" < lagu); diphthongisation before /h/ ("sought" < sōhte, "taught" < tāhte, "daughter" < dohtor); borrowings from Latin and French ("fawn" < Old French faune, "Paul" < Latin Paulus). Other sources are Early Modern English lengthening of /a/ before /l/ ("salt, all"); occasional shortening and later re-lengthening of Middle English /ɔː/ ("broad" < /brɔːd/ < brād); and in American English, lengthening of short ⟨o⟩ before unvoiced fricatives and voiced velars ("dog, long, off, cross, moth", all with /ɔ/ in American English, at least in dialects that still maintain the difference between /a/ and /ɔ/).

As mentioned above, Modern English is derived from the Middle English of London, which is derived largely from Anglian Old English, with some admixture of West Saxon and Kentish. One of the most noticeable differences among the dialects is the handling of original Old English /y/. By the time of the written Old English documents, the Old English of Kent had already unrounded /y/ to /e/, and the late Old English of Anglia unrounded /y/ to /i/. In the West Saxon area, /y/ remained as such well into Middle English times, and was written ⟨u⟩ in Middle English documents from this area. Some words with this sound were borrowed into London Middle English, where the unfamiliar /y/ was substituted with /u/. Hence:

- "gild" < gyldan, "did" < dyde, "sin" < synn, "mind" < mynd, "dizzy" < dysiġ "foolish", "lift" < lyft "air", etc. show the normal (Anglian) development.
- "much" < myċel shows the West Saxon development.
- "merry" < myriġ shows the Kentish development.
- "build" < byldan and "busy" < bysiġ have their spelling from West Saxon but pronunciation from Anglian.
- "bury" /ˈbɛri/ < byrġan has its spelling from West Saxon but its pronunciation from Kentish.

Note that some apparent instances of modern ⟨e⟩ for Old English ⟨y⟩ are actually regular developments, particularly where the ⟨y⟩ is a development of earlier (West Saxon) ⟨ie⟩ from i-mutation of ⟨ea⟩, as the normal i-mutation of ⟨ea⟩ in Anglian is ⟨e⟩; for example, "stern" < styrne < *starnijaz, "steel" < stȳle < *stahliją (cf. Old Saxon stehli). Also, some apparent instances of modern ⟨u⟩ for Old English ⟨y⟩ may actually be due to the influence of a related form with unmutated ⟨u⟩, e.g. "sundry" < syndriġ, influenced by sundor "apart, differently" (cf. "to sunder" and "asunder").
