= Germanic weak verb =

Type of verb in Germanic languages

In the Germanic languages, weak verbs are by far the largest group of verbs, and are therefore often regarded as the norm (the regular verbs). They are distinguished from the Germanic strong verbs by the fact that their past tense form is marked by an inflection containing a /t/, /d/, or /ð/ sound (as in English I walk~I walked) rather than by changing the verb's root vowel (as in English I rise~I rose).

Whereas the strong verbs are the oldest group of verbs in Germanic, originating in Indo-European, the weak verbs arose as an innovation in Proto-Germanic. Originally the weak verbs consisted of new verbs coined from pre-existing nouns (for example the noun name was turned into the verb to name), or coined from strong verbs to express the sense of causing the action denoted by that strong verb (for example the strong verb to rise was turned into the weak verb to raise).

However, over time, the weak verbs have become the normal form of verbs in all Germanic languages, with most strong verbs being reassigned to the weak class. For example, in Old English the verb to lock (lūcan) was strong (present tense ic lūce 'I lock', past tense ic lēac 'I locked'), but has now become weak. This transition is ongoing. For example, the English verb to cleave currently exists in both a conservative strong form (past tense I clove) and an innovative weak form (past tense I cleaved~I cleft).

== General description ==
In Germanic languages, weak verbs form their preterites and past participles by means of a dental suffix, an inflection that contains a /t/ or /d/ sound or similar. (For comparative purposes, they will be referred to as a dental, but in some of the languages, including most varieties of English, /t/ and /d/ are alveolar instead.) In all Germanic languages, the preterite and past participle forms of weak verbs are formed from the same stem.

	Infinitive	Preterite
English (regular)	to love	loved
English (regular)	to laugh	laughed
English (irregular)	to say	said
English (irregular)	to send	sent
English (irregular)	to buy	bought
English (irregular)	to set	set
German	lieben (love)	liebte
German	bringen (bring)	brachte

Historically, the pronunciation of the suffix in the vast majority of weak verbs (all four classes) was [ð] but, in most sources discussing Proto-Germanic, it is spelled ⟨d⟩ by convention. In the West Germanic languages, the suffix hardened to [d], but it remained a fricative in the other early Germanic languages (Gothic and often in Old Norse).

In the English language, the dental is a /d/ after a voiced consonant (loved) or vowel (laid), a /t/ after a voiceless consonant (laughed), and /ɪd/ after the dentals/alveolars /t/ and /d/ themselves, but English uses the suffix spelling ⟨ed⟩ regardless of pronunciation, with the exception of a few verbs with irregular spellings. (Note: Often also somewhat irregular past tenses as well: make /meɪk/, made /meɪd/ (from earlier maked); say /seɪ/, said /sɛd/, (< Μid.Εngl. saie, saied); sleep /sliːp/, slept /slɛpt/, and so on.)

In Dutch, /t/ and /d/ are distributed as in English provided there is a following vowel. When there is no following vowel, terminal devoicing leads to the universal /t/. Nevertheless, Dutch still distinguishes between the spellings in ⟨d⟩ and ⟨t⟩ even in final position: see the 't kofschip rule.

In Afrikaans, which descends from Dutch, the past tense has fallen out of use altogether, and the past participle is marked only with the prefix ge-. Therefore, the suffix has disappeared along with the forms that originally contained it.

In German the dental is always /t/ and always spelled ⟨t⟩ because of the third phase of the High German consonant shift (d→t).

In Low German, the dental ending of the preterite tense was originally /d/ or /t/, according to the stem of the verb. However the ending has fallen out in pronunciation, starting in the 17th century when the preterite was written with the ending -er representing the sound [ɐ], which was already the last remnant of the former -de and -te endings of Middle Low German. Now, the only Low German verbs that still show a remnant of a dental ending are leggen, which has the preterite leed, and the verb hebben, which has harr with old r-ending from the Middle Low German dental.

In Icelandic, the dental was originally a voiced dental fricative /ð/. It is preserved as such after vowels, voiced fricatives, and /r/ but has been hardened to a stop /d/ after nasals and /l/. It and has been devoiced to /t/ after voiceless consonants and in some other cases (in most Old Norse texts, the alternation is already found in heavy roots, but the light ones preserve /ð/). Furthermore, the voicing contrast between /d/ and /t/ has been replaced in modern Icelandic by an aspiration contrast, which may not be realized phonetically in all the relevant positions.

The situation of early Norwegian was similar to Icelandic, but intervocalic /ð/ eventually disappeared. In the verbs in which it remains, the dental is /t/ or /d/, depending on conjugation class and dialect. It is spelled accordingly. In Nynorsk, it can be different in the preterite and the past participle.

Swedish has a similar situation to that of Norwegian, but the dental is retained in the spelling, even between vowels. Some informal spellings indicate a lost dental, such as in sa ("said") from the standard spelling sade.

== Classes of verbs ==
In Proto-Germanic, there were seven types of weak verbs, five of which were common. However, they are normally grouped into four classes, based on the conjugational system of Gothic.

=== Class I verbs ===
Class I verbs actually consist of three classes in Proto-Germanic:

==== Class I, subclass (i) ====
A small class of verbs had no suffix in the present, and no suffix in the past (other than the -d- or -t- of all weak verbs). This class had only three members:

1. **bringaną "to bring", past tense **branht-. This verb was continued as such in all the descendants, although an alternate stem **brangij- occasionally appeared in some of the West Germanic languages (e.g., Old English brenġan).
2. **brūkaną "to use", past tense **brūht-. This verb tended to move into other classes. For example, in Gothic this verb moved into subclass (ii) of Class I (brūkjan, past brūhta), whereas in Old English it became a Class II strong verb (brūcan, past tense brēac ← *brauk).
3. **būaną "to dwell", past tense **būd-. This verb continued as such in most descendants but became a Class III weak verb bauan in Gothic.

==== Class I, subclass (ii) ====
A small class of verbs had the suffix -j- in the present and no suffix in the past. This class had only five members in Proto-Germanic:

1. **bugjaną "to buy," past tense **buht-
2. **sōkijaną "to seek," past tense **sōht- (given a regularized subclass (iii) past sōkida in Gothic)
3. **þankijaną "to think," past tense **þanht-
4. **þunkijaną "to seem," past tense **þunht-
5. **wurkijaną "to work," past tense **wurht-

Verbs of this class were said to undergo rückumlaut ("reverse umlaut") in the past, since the umlaut occurring in the present (triggered by the -j-) is undone or "reversed" in the past (due to the lack of the umlaut-triggering stem -i- of subclass [iii]), leading to a non-umlauted vowel in the past.

These verbs also have consonant and vowel alternations between present and past that are due to regular sound changes but result in strikingly different forms in the historical Germanic languages (e.g., think, past tense thought). Specifically:

- There is an alternation between -k- or -g- in the present and -h- in the past, caused by the -t- of the past-tense suffix. Prior to the operation of Grimm's Law, the stem consonant was -g- or -gʰ-. Before -t-, the consonant was devoiced to -k- by assimilation and then became -h- by Grimm's Law. This alternation is sometimes called Primärberührung.
- -n- before -h- disappeared after nasalizing the previous vowel. When the -n- disappeared, the vowel was lengthened by the process of compensatory lengthening.
- -u- was lowered to -o- in the past tense due to a-mutation, since the following vowel was always non-high.

The class remained small in Gothic, but expanded significantly in the other languages:

- In Old Norse, all short-stem verbs (those with a short vowel followed by at most one consonant, or a long vowel followed by no consonant) appeared to move into this class, as indicated by the fact that no umlaut occurs in the past, as would be caused by a suffix -i-. However, this may have been due to a regular sound change that eliminated unstressed, nonfinal short vowels coming after a short stem before the operation of umlaut.
- In Old High German, short-stem verbs ending in -zz (-tz), -pf, -ck (Proto-Germanic root ending in *-t, -p, or -k), and optionally those in -ll, join this class. For example, zellen "to tell" < *taljan, past tense zalta, zelita. A number of long-stem verbs also join this class, like brennen "to burn," past tense branta; wenten "to turn," past tense wanta.
- In Old English and the other northern West Germanic languages, a number of verbs ending in -(c)c- and -ll- joined the class, including the following Old English verbs:

- cweccan "to shake" < *kwakjan, past tense cweahte < *kwaht-
- dreccan "to afflict," past tense dreahte
- læccan "to seize" (based on earlier *lǣcan?), past tense lǣhte
- leccan "to moisten," past tense leahte
- rǣcan "to reach" < *raikjan, past tense rǣhte, rāhte < *raiht-
- reccan "to narrate," past tense reahte
- reccan "to care for" (based on earlier *rēcan?), past tense rōhte
- tǣcan "to teach," past tense tǣhte, tāhte
- streccan "to stretch," past tense streahte
- þeccan "to cover," past tense þeahte
- weccan "to awake," past tense weahte
- cwellan "to kill" < *kwaljan, past tense cwealde < *kwald
- dwellan "to dwell," past tense dwealde
- sellan "to give, sell," past tense sealde
- stellan "to place," past tense stealde
- tellan "to tell," past tense tealde

In Late Old English, further verbs in -can were drawn into this class by analogy, but with umlaut maintained, e.g., bepǣcan "to deceive", past tense bepǣhte, earlier bepǣcte, or wleccan "to warm," past tense wlehte, earlier wlecede. At the same time, verbs in -ccan were modified to follow the same pattern, as in the new past tense form cwehte alongside earlier cweahte.

==== Class I, subclass (iii) ====
A large class of verbs had the suffix -j- in the present and -i- in the past, for example, Gothic satjan "to set" (Old English settan) and sandjan "to send" (Old English sendan). As shown in the Old English cognates:

- The -j- produced umlaut of the stem vowel in languages other than Gothic.
- The -j- caused West Germanic gemination in the West Germanic languages in short-stem verbs ending in a consonant other than -r.
- The -j- resulted in palatalization of preceding velar consonants in Old English.
- The -j- remained in Gothic and Old Saxon, but disappeared in the other languages: In long-stem verbs in Old Norse, and in all verbs except those in -r in the remaining West Germanic languages. (In Old High German, it deflected *-jan into *-jen before disappearing, leaving the suffix -en. This phenomenon, which resembles the usual umlaut of a in syllables preceding j, is nevertheless distinct and must have happened later, as the missing j also caused umlaut.)

This class was split into two subclasses in all the Old Germanic languages, one consisting of short-stem verbs and one of long-stem verbs. The distinction between the two was originally due to Sievers' Law, and was extended due to changes such as West Germanic gemination, which affected short-stem but not long-stem verbs. The West Germanic languages had a third subclass consisting of short-stem verbs ending in -r (e.g., Old English erian "to plow," nerian "to save," styrian "to stir"), due to West Germanic gemination and subsequent loss of -j- not taking place.

The following is a cross-language paradigm of a short-stem Class I verb **gramjaną "to anger" (Gothic gramjan, Old Norse gremja, Old High German gremmen, Old Saxon *gremmian, Old English gremman, Old Frisian *gremma). Note that the Old Saxon and Old Frisian verbs given here are unattested, almost certainly due to the small nature of the respective corpora.

		Gothic	Old Norse	Old High German	Old Saxon	Old English	Old Frisian
Infinitive		gramjan	gremja	gremmen	gremmian	gremman	gremma
Pres.	1SG	gramja	grem	gremmu	gremmiu	gremme	gremme
Pres.	2SG	gramjis	gremr	gremis(t)	gremis	gremes(t)	gremest
Pres.	3SG	gramjiþ	gremr	gremit	gremid	gremeþ	gremeth
Pres.	1DU	gramjōs	—N/a				
Pres.	2DU	gramjats	—N/a				
Pres.	1PL	gramjam	gremjum	gremmemēs (-ēn)	gremmiad	gremmaþ	gremmath
Pres.	2PL	gramjiþ	gremið	gremmet	gremmiad	gremmaþ	gremmath
Pres.	3PL	gramjand	gremja	gremment	gremmiad	gremmaþ	gremmath
Pres. subj.	1SG	gramjáu	gremja	gremme	gremmia (-ie)	gremme	
Pres. subj.	3SG	gramjái	gremi	gremme	gremmia (-ie)	gremme	
Pres. subj.	2SG	gramjáis	gremir	gremmēs(t)	gremmias (-ies)	gremme	
Pres. subj.	1DU	gramjáiwa	—N/a				
Pres. subj.	2DU	gramjáits	—N/a				
Pres. subj.	1PL	gramjáima	gremim	gremmēm (-ēn, -ēmēs)	gremmian	gremmen	
Pres. subj.	2PL	gramjáiþ	gremið	gremmēt	gremmian	gremmen	
Pres. subj.	3PL	gramjáina	gremi	gremmēn	gremmian	gremmen	
Past	1SG	gramida	gramda	gremita	gremida	gremede	
Past	3SG	gramida	gramdi	gremita	gremida	gremede	
Past	2SG	gramidēs	gramdir	gremitōs(t)	gremidōs	gremedes(t)	gremedest
Past	1DU	gramidēdu	—N/a				
Past	2DU	gramidēduts	—N/a				
Past	1PL	gramidēdum	grǫmdum	gremitum (-un, -umēs)	gremidun	gremedon	
Past	2PL	gramidēduþ	grǫmduð	gremitut	gremidun	gremedon	
Past	3PL	gramidēdun	grǫmdu	gremitun	gremidun	gremedon	
Past subj.	1SG	gramidēdjáu	gremda	gremiti (-ī)	gremidi	gremede	
Past subj.	3SG	gramidēdi	gremdi	gremiti (-ī)	gremidi	gremede	
Past subj.	2SG	gramidēdeis	gremdir	gremitīs(t)	gremidīs	gremede	
Past subj.	1DU	gramidēdeiwa	—N/a				
Past subj.	2DU	gramidēdeits	—N/a				
Past subj.	1PL	gramidēdeima	gremdim	gremitīm (-īn, -īmēs)	gremidīn	gremeden	
Past subj.	2PL	gramidēdeiþ	gremdið	gremitīt	gremidīn	gremeden	
Past subj.	3PL	gramidēdeina	gremdi	gremitīn	gremidīn	gremeden	
Imper.	2SG	gramei	grem	gremi		greme	
Imper.	3SG	gramjadáu	—N/a				
Imper.	2DU	gramjats	—N/a				
Imper.	1PL	gramjam	gremjum	gremmemēs (-ēn)	—N/a		
Imper.	2PL	gramjiþ	gremið	gremmet	gremmiad	gremmaþ	gremmath
Imper.	3PL	gramjandáu	—N/a				
Pres. participle		gramjands	gremjandi	gremmenti	gremmiand	gremmende	gremmand
Past participle		gramiþs	*gramiðr	gigremit	gremid	gremed	

The following is a cross-language paradigm of a long-stem Class I verb **hauzijaną "to hear" (Gothic hausjan, Old Norse heyra, Old High German hōren, Old Saxon hōrian, Old English hīeran, Old Frisian hēra)

		Gothic	Old Norse	Old High German	Old Saxon	Old English	Old Frisian
Infinitive		hausjan	heyra	hōren	hōrian	hīeran	hēra
Pres.	1SG	hausja	heyri	hōru	hōriu	hīere	hēre
Pres.	2SG	hauseis	heyrir	hōris(t)	hōris	hīer(e)s(t)	hēr(i)st
Pres.	3SG	hauseiþ	heyrir	hōrit	hōrid	hīer(e)þ	hēr(i)th
Pres.	1DU	hausjōs	—N/a				
Pres.	2DU	hausjats	—N/a				
Pres.	1PL	hausjam	heyrum	hōremēs (-ēn)	hōriad	hīeraþ	hērath
Pres.	2PL	hauseiþ	heyrið	hōret	hōriad	hīeraþ	hērath
Pres.	3PL	hausjand	heyra	hōrent	hōriad	hīeraþ	hērath
Pres. subj.	1SG	hausjáu	heyra	hōre	hōria (-ie)	hīere	hēri (-e)
Pres. subj.	3SG	hausjái	heyri	hōre	hōria (-ie)	hīere	hēri (-e)
Pres. subj.	2SG	hausjáis	heyrir	hōrēs(t)	hōrias (-ies)	hīere	hēri (-e)
Pres. subj.	1DU	hausjáiwa	—N/a				
Pres. subj.	2DU	hausjáits	—N/a				
Pres. subj.	1PL	hausjáima	heyrim	hōrēm (-ēn, -ēmēs)	hōrian	hīeren	hēri (-e)
Pres. subj.	2PL	hausjáiþ	heyrið	hōrēt	hōrian	hīeren	hēri (-e)
Pres. subj.	3PL	hausjáina	heyri	hōrēn	hōrian	hīeren	hēri (-e)
Past	1SG	hausida	heyrða	hōrta	hōrda	hīerde	hērde
Past	3SG	hausida	heyrði	hōrta	hōrda	hīerde	hērde
Past	2SG	hausidēs	heyrðir	hōrtōs(t)	hōrdōs	hiērdes(t)	hērdest
Past	1DU	hausidēdu	—N/a				
Past	2DU	hausidēduts	—N/a				
Past	1PL	hausidēdum	heyrðum	hōrtum (-un, -umēs)	hōrdun	hīerdon	hērdon
Past	2PL	hausidēduþ	heyrðuð	hōrtut	hōrdun	hīerdon	hērdon
Past	3PL	hausidēdun	heyrðu	hōrtun	hōrdun	hīerdon	hērdon
Past subj.	1SG	hausidēdjáu	heyrða	hōrti (-ī)	hōrdi	hīerde	hērde
Past subj.	3SG	hausidēdi	heyrði	hōrti (-ī)	hōrdi	hīerde	hērde
Past subj.	2SG	hausidēdeis	heyrðir	hōrtīs(t)	hōrdīs	hīerde	hērde
Past subj.	1DU	hausidēdeiwa	—N/a				
Past subj.	2DU	hausidēdeits	—N/a				
Past subj.	1PL	hausidēdeima	heyrðim	hōrtīm (-īn, -īmēs)	hōrdīn	hīerden	hērde
Past subj.	2PL	hausidēdeiþ	heyrðið	hōrtīt	hōrdīn	hīerden	hērde
Past subj.	3PL	hausidēdeina	heyrði	hōrtīn	hōrdīn	hīerden	hērde
Imper.	2SG	hausei	heyr	hōri		hīer	hēre
Imper.	3SG	hausjadáu	—N/a				
Imper.	2DU	hausjats	—N/a				
Imper.	1PL	hausjam	heyrum	hōremēs (-ēn)	—N/a		
Imper.	2PL	hauseiþ	heyrið	hōret	hōriad	hīeraþ	hērath
Imper.	3PL	hausjandáu	—N/a				
Pres. participle		hausjands	heyrandi	hōrenti	hōriand	hīerende	hērand
Past participle		hausiþs	heyrðr	gihōrit	hōrid	hīered	hēred

=== Class II verbs ===
Class II verbs were formed with a suffix -ō-. In the northern West Germanic languages, an alternative extended suffix -ōja- sometimes appears in the non-past forms, e.g., the Old English infinitive -ian < *-ōjan.

The following is a cross-language paradigm of **laþōną "to invite" (Gothic laþōn, Old Norse laða, Old High German ladōn, lathōn, Old Saxon lathian [-ōjan], ladian [-ōjan], Old English laþian, Old Frisian lathia).

		Gothic	Old Norse	Old High German	Old Saxon	Old English	Old Frisian
Infinitive		laþōn	laða	ladōn, lathōn	lathian (-ōjan), ladian (-ōjan)	laþian	lathia
Pres.	1SG	laþō	laða	ladōm (-ōn), lathōm (-ōn)	lathōn, ladōn	laþie	lathie
Pres.	2SG	laþōs	laðar	ladōs(t), lathōs(t)	lathōs, ladōs	laþast	lathast (-est)
Pres.	3SG	laþōþ	laðar	ladōt, lathōt	lathōd, ladōd	laþaþ	lathath
Pres.	1DU	laþōs	—N/a				
Pres.	2DU	laþōts	—N/a				
Pres.	1PL	laþōm	lǫðum	ladōmēs (-ōn), lathōmēs (-ōn)	lathōd (-ōjad), ladōd (-ōjad)	laþiaþ	lathiath
Pres.	2PL	laþōþ	laðið	ladōt, lathōt	lathōd (-ōjad), ladōd (-ōjad)	laþiaþ	lathiath
Pres.	3PL	laþōnd	laða	ladōnt, lathōnt	lathōd (-ōjad), ladōd (-ōjad)	laþiaþ	lathiath
Pres. subj.	1SG	laþō	laða	lado, latho	lathō (-ōja), ladō (-ōja)	laþie	lathie
Pres. subj.	3SG	laþō	laði	lado, latho	lathō (-ōja), ladō (-ōja)	laþie	lathie
Pres. subj.	2SG	laþōs	laðir	ladōs(t), lathōs(t)	lathōs (-ōjes), ladōs (-ōjes)	laþie	lathie
Pres. subj.	1DU	laþōwa	—N/a				
Pres. subj.	2DU	laþōts	—N/a				
Pres. subj.	1PL	laþōma	laðim	ladōm (-ōn, -ōmēs), lathōm (-ōn, -ōmēs)	lathōn, ladōn	laþien	lathie
Pres. subj.	2PL	laþōþ	laðið	ladōt, lathōt	lathōn, ladōn	laþien	lathie
Pres. subj.	3PL	laþōna	laði	ladōn, lathōn	lathōn, ladōn	laþien	lathie
Past	1SG	laþōda	laðaða	ladōta, lathōta	lathōda, ladōda	laþode	lathade
Past	3SG	laþōda	laðaði	ladōta, lathōta	lathōda, ladōda	laþode	lathade
Past	2SG	laþōdēs	laðaðir	ladōtōs(t), lathōtōs(t)	lathōdōs, ladōdōs	laþodest	*lathadest
Past	1DU	laþōdēdu	—N/a				
Past	2DU	laþōdēduts	—N/a				
Past	1PL	laþōdēdum	lǫðuðum	ladōtum (-un, -umēs), lathōtum (-un, -umēs)	lathōdun, ladōdun	laþodon	lathadon
Past	2PL	laþōdēduþ	lǫðuðuð	ladōtut, lathōtut	lathōdun, ladōdun	laþodon	lathadon
Past	3PL	laþōdēdun	lǫðuðu	ladōtun, lathōtun	lathōdun, ladōdun	laþodon	lathadon
Past subj.	1SG	laþōdēdjáu	laðaða	ladōti (-ī), lathōti (-ī)	lathōda, ladōda	laþode	*lathade
Past subj.	3SG	laþōdēdi	laðaði	ladōti (-ī), lathōti (-ī)	lathōda, ladōda	laþode	*lathade
Past subj.	2SG	laþōdēdeis	laðaðir	ladōtīs(t), lathōtīs(t)	lathōdōs, ladōdōs	laþode	*lathade
Past subj.	1DU	laþōdēdeiwa	—N/a				
Past subj.	2DU	laþōdēdeits	—N/a				
Past subj.	1PL	laþōdēdeima	laðaðim	ladōtīm (-īn, -īmēs), lathōtīm (-īn, -īmēs)	lathōdun, ladōdun	laþoden	lathade
Past subj.	2PL	laþōdēdeiþ	laðaðið	ladōtīt, lathōtīt	lathōdun, ladōdun	laþoden	lathade
Past subj.	3PL	laþōdēdeina	laðaði	ladōtīn, lathōtīn	lathōdun, ladōdun	laþoden	lathade
Imper.	2SG	laþō	laða	lado, latho	lathō, ladō	laþa	*latha
Imper.	3SG	laþōdáu	—N/a				
Imper.	2DU	laþōts	—N/a				
Imper.	1PL	laþōm	lǫðum	ladōmēs (-ōn), lathōmēs (-ōn)	—N/a		
Imper.	2PL	laþōþ	laðið	ladōt, lathōt	lathōd, ladōd	laþiaþ	*lathiath
Imper.	3PL	laþōndáu	—N/a				
Pres. participle		laþōnds	laðandi	ladōnti, lathōnti	lathōnd (-ōjand), ladōnd (-ōjand)	laþiende	lath(i)ande
Past participle		laþōþs	laðaðr	ladōt, lathōt	lathōd, ladōd	laþod	lathad

=== Class III verbs ===
What is known as "Class III" was actually two separate classes in Proto-Germanic:

- A class of verbs with stative semantics (i.e., denoting a state rather than an action), formed with a present suffix that was either *-ai- or *-ja-, and no suffix in the past.
- A class of verbs with factitive semantics (i.e., with the meaning "make X" where X is an adjective or noun, e.g., "renew, enslave"), formed with a suffix that was either *-ai- or *-ā-, and a suffix *-a- in the past.

The histories of this class in the various Germanic languages are quite varied:

- Old High German combined both into a single class and generalized *-ai- (appearing as -ē- through regular sound change) to all forms of the present and past.
- Gothic combined both into a single class, keeping the *-ai-/-ā- alternation of the factitives in the present, generalizing the alternation to the statives as well, and borrowing *-ai- as the past suffix.
- Old Norse for the most part combined both into a single class in the same fashion as Gothic; however, two relic stative verbs (segja "to say" and þegja "to be silent") preserve the stative suffixes in both present and past, and a third verb (hafa "to have") is a mixture of the two, with factitive suffixes in the present indicative plural and imperative and stative suffixes in the present indicative singular and past participle (elsewhere, the two types have fallen together).
- The other (i.e., northern) West Germanic languages have only small numbers of Class III verbs—but they consistently follow the stative paradigm, unlike the three languages above.

An example is the stative verb reconstructed as Proto-Germanic **habjaną "to have", past indicative third-person singular *habdē:

- Old English hebban < *habjan, past, third-person singular hæfde — derived entirely through regular sound changes.
- Old High German habēn, past, third person singular habēta — derived through analogical spread of suffix -ē-.
- Gothic haban, past, third-person singular habáida — derived through various analogical changes.
- Old Norse hafa, past, third-person hafði — partly regular, partly analogical.

Only four stative verbs survive as Class III verbs in the northern West Germanic languages (i.e., Old English, Old Saxon, Old Frisian and Old Low Franconian):

- **sagjaną "to say"
- **libjaną "to live"
- **habjaną "to hold, have"
- **hugjaną "to think"

However, there are five more verbs that appear as Class III verbs in Old High German, Gothic, and/or Old Norse that also have remnants of the stative conjugation in one or more northern West Germanic languages:

- **þagjaną "to be silent"
- **siljaną "to be silent"
- **þuljaną "to endure" (normally Class II þolian in Old English, but compare archaic umlauted infinitive -þoelġe; Class III in Old Norse þola)
- **fijaną "to hate"
- **hatjaną "to hate" (normally Class II hatian in Old English, but compare umlauted nominalized present participle hettend "enemy"; Class III in Gothic hatan)

=== Class IV verbs ===
Class IV verbs were formed with a suffix -nan, e.g., Gothic fullnan "to become full". The present tense was conjugated as a strong verb, for example, Gothic fullna, fullnis, fullniþ, etc. The past tense was conjugated with suffix -nō-, e.g., Gothic fullnōda, fullnōdēs, etc. This class vanished in other Germanic languages; however, a significant number of cognate verbs appear as Class II verbs in Old Norse and as Class III verbs in Old High German. This class has fientive semantics, that is, "become X," where X is an adjective or a past participle of a verb.

- Examples of deadjectival Class IV verbs in Gothic are ga-blindnan "to become blind" (blinds "blind"), ga-háilnan "to become whole" (háils "whole").
- Examples of deverbal Class IV verbs in Gothic are fra-lusnan "to perish" (fra-liusan "to destroy"), ga-þaúrsnan "to dry up, wither away" (ga-þaírsan "to wither"), mikilnan "to be magnified" (mikiljan "to magnify"), us-háuhnan "to be exalted" (us-háuhjan "to exalt").

Note that the last two are deverbal even though the underlying root is adjectival because they are formed to other verbs (which are in turn formed from adjectives).

The vast majority of Class IV verbs appear to be deverbal. Class IV verbs derived from weak verbs keep the same stem form as the underlying weak verb. However, class IV verbs derived from strong verbs adopt the ablaut of the past participle, for example:

- dis-skritnan "to be torn to pieces" (Class I dis-skreitan "to tear to pieces")
- us-gutnan "to be poured out" (Class II giutan "to pour")
- and-bundnan "to become unbound" (Class III and-bindan "to unbind")
- dis-taúrnan "to be torn asunder, burst asunder" (Class IV dis-taíran "to tear asunder, burst")
- ufar-hafnan "to be exalted" (Class VI ufar-hafjan "to exalt")
- bi-auknan "to abound, become larger" (Class VII bi-aukan "to increase, add to").

== Modern languages ==
In the modern languages, the various classes have mostly been leveled into a single productive class. Icelandic, Norwegian and Frisian have retained two productive classes of weak verbs. (In Frisian, in addition to the class with -de, there is a class of je- verbs, where the dental suffix has dropped, i.e., -je < -iad.) Swiss German also has two types of weak verbs, descended from Class I and Classes II and III, respectively, of Old High German weak verbs and marked with -t and -et, respectively, in the past participle. In Westphalian Low German, as well as in some West Central German dialects, the distinction between Class 1, subclass (iii), and Class 2 verbs has been partially preserved in the inflectional paradigm, with the former exhibiting Rückumlaut.

In the history of English, the following changes happened:

1. Most Class III verbs were moved into Class II prior to the historical period of Old English.
2. The remaining four Class III verbs moved into Class I or Class II late in Old English.
3. Throughout the Middle English period, Class I verbs gradually moved into Class II.

In modern English, only one productive weak paradigm remains, derived from Class II. A number of Class I verbs still persist, for example:

- From Old English subclass (i): bring (brought)
- From Old English subclass (ii) or analogously: buy (bought); catch (caught); seek (sought); sell (sold); teach (taught); tell (told); think (thought); work (wrought) [obsolescent]
- From Old English subclass (iii) or analogously: bend (bent); bet (bet); breed (bred); build (built); cast (cast); cost (cost); creep (crept); cut (cut); deal (dealt); dream (dreamt); feed (fed); flee (fled); hear (heard); hit (hit); hurt (hurt); keep (kept); kneel (knelt); knit (knit); lay (laid); lead (led); leap (leapt); leave (left); lend (lent); light (lit); lose (lost); mean (meant); meet (met); put (put); read (read); rend (rent) [obsolescent]; send (sent); set (set); shed (shed); shoot (shot); shut (shut); sleep (slept); speed (sped); spend (spent); spill (spilt); split (split); spread (spread); sweep (swept); thrust (thrust); wed (wed); weep (wept); as well as a few others
- From Old English Class III verbs: have (had); say (said)

As the previous list shows, although there is only one productive class of weak verbs, there are plenty of "irregular" weak verbs that do not follow the paradigm of this class. Furthermore, the regular paradigm in English is not unitary, but in fact is divided into subclasses in both the written and spoken language, although in different ways:

- In the written language, before the past-tense suffix -ed, short-stem verbs double the final consonant (e.g., dip [dipped]), while a -y following a consonant becomes -i- (e.g., carry [carried]).
- In the spoken language, the past-tense suffix -ed is variously pronounced /t/, /d/, or /ɪd, əd/ depending on the preceding consonant.

Both of these characteristics occur in a similar fashion in most or all the modern Germanic languages. In modern German, for example, descendants of the original subclass (ii) of Class I are still irregular (e.g., denken [dachte] "to think", brennen [brannte] "to burn"), and subclasses of the productive verb paradigm are formed by verbs ending in -eln or -ern and in -ten or -den, among others.

=== Modern paradigms ===
One of the regular weak verb conjugations is as follows.

==== West Germanic ====
	English	West Frisian		Dutch	Low German (Westphalian)		German
Infinitive	work	wurkje	leare	werken	wearken	lären	werken
Present	I work thou workest he works we work you work they work	ik wurkje do wurkest hy wurket wy wurkje jim wurkje hja wurkje	ik lear do learst hy leart wy leare jim leare hja leare	ik werk jij werkt; werk jij? hij werkt wij werken jullie werken zij werken	ik wearke du wearkes he wearket wi wearket gi wearket se wearket	ik läre du lärs he lärt wi lärt ji lärt se lärt	ich werke du werkst er werkt wir werken ihr werkt sie werken
Preterite	I worked thou workedst he worked we worked you worked they worked	ik wurke do wurkest hy wurke wy wurken jim wurken hja wurken	ik learde do leardest hy learde wy learden jim learden hij learden	ik werkte jij werkte hij werkte wij werkten jullie werkten zij werkten	ik wearkede du wearkedes he wearkede wi wearkeden gi wearkeden se wearkeden	ik larte du lärtes he larte wi lärten ji lärten se lärten	ich werkte du werktest er werkte wir werkten ihr werktet sie werkten
Past participle	worked	wurke	leard	gewerkt	wearked	lart	gewerkt

==== North Germanic ====
	Danish	Norwegian Bokmål	Swedish	Norwegian Nynorsk	Icelandic	Faroese
Infinitive	virke		verka	verka/verke	verka	virka ^{1}
present	jeg virker du virker han virker vi virker I virker de virker		jag verkar du verkar han verkar vi verkar ni verkar de verkar		ég verka þú verkar hann verkar við verkum þið verkið þeir verka	eg virki tú virkar hann virkar vit virka tit virka teir virka
Preterite	jeg virkede du virkede han virkede vi virkede I virkede de virkede	jeg virket/virka du virket/virka han virket/virka vi virket/virka dere virket/virka de virket/virka	jag verkade du verkade han verkade vi verkade ni verkade de verkade	eg verka du verka han verka vi/me verka de verka dei verka	ég verkaði þú verkaðir hann verkaði við verkuðum þið verkuðuð þeir verkuðu	eg virkaði tú virkaði hann virkaði vit virkaðu tit virkaðu teir virkaðu
Past participle	virket	virket/virka	verkat	verka	verkað	virkaður

1. prepare, manufacture

== Weak and strong verbs ==
Weak verbs should be contrasted with strong verbs, which form their past tenses by means of ablaut (vowel gradation: sing - sang - sung). Most verbs in the early stages of the Germanic languages were strong. However, as the ablaut system is no longer productive except in rare cases of analogy. Almost all new verbs in Germanic languages are weak, and the majority of the original strong verbs have become weak by analogy.

=== Strong to weak transformations ===
As an example of the rather common process of originally strong verbs becoming weak, we may consider the development from the Old English strong verb scūfan to modern English shove:

- scūfan scēaf scofen (strong class 2)
- shove shoved shoved

Many hundreds of weak verbs in contemporary English go back to Old English strong verbs.

In some cases, a verb has become weak in the preterite but not in the participle and may be thought of as "semi-strong" (not a technical term). Dutch has a number of examples:

- wassen waste gewassen ("to wash")
- lachen lachte gelachen ("to laugh")

An example in English is:

- sow sowed sown (strong class 7 with weak preterite)

Often, the old strong participle may survive as an adjective long after it has been replaced with a weak form in verbal constructions. The English adjective molten is an old strong participle of melt, which is now a purely weak verb with the participle melted. The participle gebacken of the German verb backen (to bake), is gradually being replaced by gebackt, but the adjective is always gebacken (baked).

=== Weak to strong transformations ===
The reverse process is very rare and can also be partial, producing "semi-strong" verbs as in show showed shown (originally a weak verb with its participle modelled on sown).

Weak verbs that develop strong forms are often unstable. A typical example is German fragen ("to ask"), which is historically weak and is still weak in standard German. However, for a time in the 18th century, the forms fragen, frug, gefragen by analogy with, for example, tragen ("to carry") were also considered acceptable in the standard. They survive today (along with a present tense frägt) in the Rhinelandic regiolect and underlying dialects. In Dutch, vragen (idem) has developed the new strong past vroeg in place of an expected **vraagde, while retaining a weak past participle gevraagd (though some dialects do have gevrogen).

== Origins ==
The weak conjugation of verbs is an innovation of Proto-Germanic (unlike the older strong verbs, the basis of which goes back to Proto-Indo-European). While primary verbs (those inherited from PIE) already had an ablaut-based perfect form that was the basis of the Germanic strong preterite, secondary verbs (those derived from other forms after the break-up of PIE) had to form a preterite otherwise, which necessitated the creation of the weak conjugation.

=== Denominative derivation ===
The vast majority of weak verbs are secondary, or derived. The two main types of derived verbs were denominative and deverbative. A denominative verb is one that has been created out of a noun. The denominative in Indo-European and early Germanic was formed by adding an ablauting thematic *-yé/ó- suffix to a noun or adjective. This created verbs such as Gothic namnjan 'to name'.

=== Causative verbs ===
A significant subclass of Class I weak verbs are (deverbal) causative verbs. They are formed in a way that reflects a direct inheritance from the PIE causative class of verbs. PIE causatives were formed by adding an accented affix -éy- to the o-grade of a non-derived verb. In Proto-Germanic, causatives are formed by adding a suffix -j/ij- (the reflex of PIE -éy-) to the past-tense ablaut (mostly with the reflex of PIE o-grade) of a strong verb (the reflex of PIE non-derived verbs), with Verner's Law voicing applied (the reflex of the PIE accent on the -éy- suffix):

- *bītaną (I) "to bite" → *baitijaną "to bridle, yoke, restrain," i.e., "to make bite down"
- *rīsaną (I) "to rise" → *raizijaną "to raise," i.e., "to cause to rise"
- *beuganą (II) "to bend" → *baugijaną "to bend (transitive)"
- *brinnaną (III) "to burn" → *brannijaną "to burn (transitive)"
- *frawerþaną (III) "to perish" → *frawardijaną "to destroy," i.e., "to cause to perish"
- *nesaną (V) "to survive" → *nazjaną "to save," i.e., "to cause to survive"
- *ligjaną (V) "to lie down" → *lagjaną "to lay," i.e., "to cause to lie down"
- *sitjaną (V) "to sit" → *satjaną "to set, seat," i.e., "to cause to sit"
- *faraną (VI) "to travel, go" → *fōrijaną "to lead, bring," i.e., "to cause to go"
- *faraną (VI) "to travel, go" → *farjaną "to carry across," i.e., "to cause to travel" (an archaic instance of the o-grade ablaut used despite the differing past-tense ablaut)
- *grētaną (VII) "to weep" → *grōtijaną "to cause to weep"
- *lais (I, preterite-present) "(s)he knows" → *laizijaną "to teach," i.e., "to cause to know"

Essentially, all verbs formed this way were conjugated as Class I weak verbs.

That method of forming causative verbs is no longer productive in the modern Germanic languages, but many relics remain. For example:

- The original strong verb fall fell fallen has a related weak verb fell felled felled, which means "to cause (a tree) to fall"
- Strong sit sat sat and lie lay lain are matched with weak set set set and lay laid laid, meaning "to cause something to sit" or "lie" respectively.

In some cases, phonological or semantic developments make the pairs difficult to recognise. For example:

- Rear is the regular phonological development of Proto-Germanic *raizijaną given in the above list, but the connection between rise and rear is no longer obvious. The word raise also ultimately defines from *raizijaną, but only via borrowing from Old Norse. The connection is perhaps made more obvious by noting that to rear a child is essentially synonymous with to raise a child.
- Drench was originally the causative of drink, but the modern meaning of "drench" ("to cause to get wet") is no longer similar to "cause to drink".
- Similarly, German strong leiden litt gelitten ("to suffer") has the derived weak verb leiten ("to lead"), which makes sense when one realises that leiden originally meant "walk, go" and came to its present meaning through the idea of "undergoing" suffering.

=== Other types ===
There are primary verbs that date to Indo-European that took a weak conjugation because they were unable to take a perfect, including verbs that had zero grade of the root in the present and so were unable to show the ablaut distinction necessary for a strong preterite. That was the case with the Gothic verbs waurkjan "to work, create," bugjan "to buy," and sokjan "to seek."

Preterite-present verbs are primary verbs in which the PIE present was lost, and the perfect was given a present meaning. They needed a new past tense, which followed the weak pattern.

Most borrowings from other languages into Germanic were weak. However, this was not always the case: for example, *skrībaną 'to write' from Latin scrībō.

=== Origin of dental suffix ===
The origin of the dental suffix is uncertain. Perhaps the most commonly held theory is that it evolved out of a periphrastic construction with the verb *dōną to do: Germanic **lubō-dē- ("love-did") > *lubōdē- > Old English lufode > loved or **salbō-dē- ("salve-did", i.e., "put salve") > **salbōdē- > Old English sealfode > salved. That would be analogous to do-support in modern English: I did love, I did salve.

The common PIE root *dʰeh₁- meaning 'do' was a root aorist and so did not take a perfect. However, it took a reduplicating present. The imperfect of the root, which filled in the simple past in Germanic, is probably the origin of the dental suffix.

Periphrastic origin of dental suffix	PIE imperfect of "do"	Proto-Germanic past of "do"	Gothic weak preterite ending
Singular	*dʰe-dʰéh₁-m	*dedǭ	-da
Singular	*dʰe-dʰéh₁-s	*dedēz	-des
Singular	*dʰe-dʰéh₁-t	*dedē	-da
Plural	*dʰe-dʰh₁-m̥é	*dēdum	-dēdum
Plural	*dʰe-dʰh₁-té	*dédd → *dēdud (by analogy)	-dēduþ
Plural	*dʰe-dʰh₁-n̥t	*dēdun	-dēdun

That view is not without objections:

- Germanic has long -ē- in the plural, which cannot directly reflect the Proto-Indo-European situation.
- Reduplication is only in the Gothic plural, not in the singular.

The objections are sometimes answered as follows:

- There might have been a refashioning according to cases like *gēbun, namely, *gegbun > gēbun: *dedun → dēdun.
- Reduplication only in the plural can easily be explained by haplology in Proto-Germanic (*dede- being reduced to *de-) for the singular, with a later development of haplology for the plural in non-East Germanic languages.

Another theory is that it came from a past participle ending, a final *-daz from PIE *-tos (compare Latin amatus), with personal endings added to it at a later stage. That theory, however, is also disputed because of its inability to explain all the facts.

According to Hill (2010), the endings, which in the singular do not show reduplication in any Germanic language, continue the PIE subjunctive of the root aorist.

== Other meanings ==
The term "weak verb" was originally coined by Jacob Grimm, who only applied it to Germanic philology. However, the term is sometimes applied to other language groups to designate phenomena that are not really analogous. For example, Hebrew irregular verbs are sometimes called weak verbs because one of their radicals is weak. See weak inflection.

== General references ==
- Bennett, William Holmes (1980). An Introduction to the Gothic Language. New York: Modern Language Association of America.
- Campbell, A. (1959). Old English Grammar. London: Oxford University Press.
- Gallée, Johan Hendrik (1910). Altsächsische Grammatik (in German) (2nd ed.). Halle (Saale): Max Niemeyer Verlag. LCCN 12005859. OCLC 3128438. OL 6541088M. Wikidata Q131582014.
- Gordon, E.V. (1927). An Introduction to Old Norse. London: Oxford University Press.
- Heuser, Wilhelm (1903). Altfriesisches Lesebuch mit Grammatik und Glossar. Heidelberg: Carl Winter's Universitätsbuchhandlung.
- Hill, Eugen (2010). "A case study in grammaticalized inflectional morphology: Origin and development of the Germanic weak preterite". Diachronica. 27 (3): 411–458. doi:10.1075/dia.27.3.02hil.
- Kroonen, Guus (2013). Etymological Dictionary of Proto-Germanic. Leiden Indo-European Etymological Dictionary Series, 11. Brill Academic Publishers. ISBN 978-90-04-18340-7.
- Plotkin, Vulf (2008). The Evolution of Germanic Phonological Systems: Proto-Germanic, Gothic, West Germanic, and Scandinavian. Lewiston: Edwin Mellen.
- Ringe, Don (2008). From Proto-Indo-European to Proto-Germanic. Oxford: OUP. ISBN 978-0-19-955229-0.
- Skeat, Walter William (1868). A Moeso-Gothic glossary. London: Asher & Co.
- Voyles, Joseph B. (1992). Early Germanic Grammar. San Diego: Academic Press. ISBN 0-12-728270-X.
- Wright, Joseph (1906). An Old High German Primer (Second ed.). Oxford: Clarendon Press.
- Wright, Joseph (1910). Grammar of the Gothic Language. Oxford: Clarendon Press.
- Wright, Joseph; Wright, Elizabeth Mary (1925). Old English Grammar (Third ed.). London: Oxford University Press.
