= Back mutation =

Back mutation may refer to:

- Back mutation, in the phonological history of Old English
- Back mutation, a type of genetic mutation
