= West Germanic gemination =

3rd-4th century West Germanic sound change

West Germanic gemination was a sound change that took place in all West Germanic languages around the 3rd or 4th century AD. It affected consonants directly followed by /j/, which were generally lengthened or geminated in that position. Because of Sievers' law, only consonants immediately after a short vowel were affected by the process.

== Overview ==
When followed by /j/, consonants were lengthened (doubled). The consonant /r/, whether original or from earlier /z/ through rhotacization, was generally not affected; it occasionally shows gemination in Old High German, but inconsistently and this may be an analogical change. In contrast, the second element of the diphthongs iu and au was still underlyingly the consonant /w/ at this time, and therefore was lengthened as well.

In Proto-Germanic, /j/ only appeared at the beginning of a syllable, primarily as the onset of a variety of suffixes and endings. It alternated with its syllabic counterpart /ij/ in accordance with a phonological rule known as Sievers' law. This law states that consonantal /j/ appeared after a "light" syllable: one that contained a short vowel followed by at most one consonant. The syllabic allomorph /ij/ appeared after "heavy" syllables, which included syllables containing a long vowel, a diphthong, or ending in more than one consonant. As the gemination itself required the consonant to be directly followed by /j/, it therefore affected only light syllables; heavy syllables were not changed. Compare, for example, the Germanic verbs *fūlijaną 'to defile' and *fuljaną 'to fill, to make full', which appear in Old English as fȳlan and fyllan respectively, and in Old High German as fūlen and fullen; the first verb shows no gemination, while the second does.

In the early history of most individual Germanic languages, syllabic /ij/ was generally lost, while consonantal /j/ was retained. Earlier consonantal /j/ is also lost, however, after a consonant that underwent gemination. Thus, /j/ remains only after /r/ (Old English werian < Proto-Germanic *warjaną), while /ij/ appears in all other cases, even those where Proto-Germanic had /j/ (such as *fuljaną above). It therefore appears that Sievers' law was still productive at this stage, and adapted to the new syllable length by changing the suffix from its consonantal to its syllabic variety.

== Gemination triggered by /l/, /r/ ==
West Germanic gemination also operated inconsistently on consonants followed by /l/ or /r/, e.g. Old English æppel 'apple' < Proto-Germanic *aplaz. In some cases this led to doublets, e.g. West Saxon Old English tēar 'tear (of the eyes)' < *tæher < Proto-Germanic *tahraz (without gemination) vs. Northumbrian Old English tæhher 'tear (of the eyes)' (with gemination).

== Parallel changes in Old Norse ==
Similar changes occurred in the history of Old Norse, although with a more limited scope. The change applied only to the combinations /kj/ and /ɡj/, which were lengthened to /kːj/ and /ɡːj/. Other consonants were not affected. Contrary to the changes in West Germanic, the /j/ remained nonsyllabic after the change, and was therefore retained rather than lost like syllabic /ij/ was in other Old Norse words.

== Effects ==
This change particularly affected the infinitives of the first conjugation of weak verbs, which ended in *-(i)janą. It also affect the short-stemmed *ja(n)- and *jō(n)-stem nouns and adjectives. By historical times (c. 800-900 AD), all of the West Germanic languages except Old Saxon had lost medial syllabic /ij/, but not before any /j/ that it may have developed from had triggered i-mutation. It also triggered palatalization of velar consonants in Old English and Old Frisian: /kj/ and /gj/ were geminated into palatal/postalveolar /cː(ij)/ and /ɟː(ij)/, which then developed into geminate affricates /tt͡ʃ/ and /dd͡ʒ/, spelled ⟨cc⟩ and ⟨cg⟩ in Old English.

Examples:

Proto-Germanic	Gothic	West Germanic	Old High German	Old Saxon	Old English	Old Norse	
*hugjaną	hugjan	*huggijan(ą)	huggen	huggian	hycgan	hyggja	'to think' (gemination also in ON)
*bidjaną	bidjan	*biddijan(ą)	bitten	biddian	biddan	biðja	'to ask'
*hlahjaną	hlahjan	*hlahhijan(ą)	(h)lahhan	hlahhian	hlæhhan	hlæja (h lost in ON)	'to laugh'
*wandijaną	wandjan	*wendijan(ą)	wenten	wendian	wendan	venda	'to turn' (no gemination before -ij-)
*hailijaną	hailjan	*hailijan(ą)	heilen	hēlian	hǣlan	heila	'to heal' (no gemination before -ij-)
*farjaną	farjan	*ferjan(ą)	ferien	ferian	ferian	ferja	'to carry' (no gemination of r)
*nazjaną	nasjan	*nerjan(ą)	nerien	nerian	nerian	-	'to heal' (no gemination of r from z)
