= Sievers's law =

Proto-Indo-European language sound law

Sievers's law in Indo-European linguistics accounts for the pronunciation of a consonant cluster with a glide (*w or *y) before a vowel as it was affected by the phonetics of the preceding syllable. Specifically, it refers to the alternation between *iy and *y, and possibly *uw and *w as conditioned by the weight of the preceding syllable. For instance, Proto-Indo-European (PIE) *kor-yo-s became Proto-Germanic *harjaz, Gothic harjis "army", but PIE *ḱerdh-yo-s became Proto-Germanic *hirdijaz, Gothic hairdeis /hɛrdiːs/ "shepherd". It differs from ablaut in that the alternation has no morphological relevance but is phonologically context-sensitive: PIE *iy followed a heavy syllable (a syllable with a diphthong or long vowel, or ending in more than one consonant), but *y would follow a light syllable (a short vowel followed by a single consonant).

== History ==
=== Discovery ===
This situation was first noticed by the Germanic philologist Eduard Sievers (1859–1932), and his aim was to account for certain phenomena in the Germanic languages. He originally discussed only *y in medial position. He also noted, almost as an aside, that something similar seemed to be going on in the earliest Sanskrit texts. Thus in the Rigveda dāivya- "divine" actually had three syllables in scansion (dāiv^{i}ya-) but satya- "true" was scanned as written.

=== Extension to other branches ===
After Sievers, scholars would find similar alternations in Greek and Latin, and alternation between *uw and *u, though the evidence is poor for all of these. Through time, evidence was announced regarding similar alternations of syllabicity in the nasal and liquid consonants, though the evidence is extremely poor for these, despite the fact that such alternations would have left permanent, indeed irreversible, traces. For example, the Sanskrit "tool-suffix" -tra- (e.g. pā-tra- "drinking cup, vessel") almost always follows a consonant or long vowel and should have therefore been -tira-; but no such form as **pōtira-, either written as such or scanned thus, is actually attested in the Rigveda or any other Indic text. How a nearly universal suffix **-tira- would have been, or even could have been, uniformly replaced by -tra- is unobvious.

=== Edgerton ===
The most ambitious extension of Sievers's law was proposed by Franklin Edgerton (1885–1963) in a pair of articles in the journal Language. He argued that not only was the syllabicity of prevocalic consonants by context applicable to all six Indo-European sonorants (*l, *m, *n *r *w *y), it was applicable in all positions in the word. Thus a form like *dyēws "sky" would have been pronounced like this only when it happened to follow a word ending with a short vowel. Everywhere else it would have had two syllables, *diyēws. Edgerton also maintained that the phonotactic rules in question applied to sequences arising across morpheme boundaries, such as when the bahuvrīhi prefix *su- occurred before a noun beginning with *w- (e.g. *su-wiHro- "well-heroed", Vedic suvīra-). According to Edgerton, the word should have had two forms, depending on what immediately preceded it: *suwiHro- and *swiHro-. This corollary he called the "converse" to Sievers's law, and is usually referred to as Edgerton's converse for short.

The evidence for alternation presented by Edgerton was of two sorts. He cited several hundred passages from the Rigveda, which he claimed should be rescanned to reveal hitherto unnoticed expressions of the syllable structure called for by his theory. But most forms show no such direct expressions; for them, Edgerton noted sharply skewed distributions that he interpreted as evidence for a lost alternation between syllabic and nonsyllabic consonants (commonly called "semivowels" in the literature). Thus say śiras "head" (from *śr̥ros) has no monosyllabic partner **śras (from *śros), but Edgerton noted that śiras occurred 100% of the time in the environments where his theory called for the syllabification of the *r. Appealing to the "formulaic" nature of oral poetry, especially in tricky and demanding literary forms like sacred Vedic versification, he reasoned that this was direct evidence for the previous existence of an alternant *śras, on the assumption that when (for whatever reason) this *śras and other forms like it came to be shunned, the typical collocations in which they would have (correctly) occurred inevitably became obsolete at the same time as the loss of the form itself. And he was able to present a sizeable body of evidence in the form of these skewed distributions in both the 1934 and 1943 articles.

Parenthetically, many of Edgerton's data on this point are inappropriate: current scholarship takes śiras, for example, to be the regular reflex of PIE *ḱr̥Hos, the syllabicity of the resonant resulting from the fact that it was followed by a consonant in Proto-Indo-European; there never was, nor could have been, a form *ḱros to yield Indic **śras. How it might be that a form that is irrelevant to Edgerton's theory might seem to "behave" in accord with it is explained below.

=== Lindeman ===
In 1965, Fredrik Otto Lindeman (1936–) published an article proposing a significant modification of Edgerton's theory. Disregarding Edgerton's evidence (on the grounds that he was not prepared to judge the niceties of Rigvedic scansion) he took instead as the data to be analyzed the scansions in Hermann Grassmann's Wörterbuch zum Rig-Veda. From these he concluded that Edgerton had been right, but only up to a point: the alternations he postulated did indeed apply to all sonorants; but in word-initial position, the alternation was limited to forms like *dyēws/diyēws "sky", as cited above – that is, words where the "short" form was monosyllabic.

=== Newer developments ===
Edgerton's claims, once generally hailed, have not fared well. Regarding the skewed distributions in the Rigveda, Edgerton neglected to test his observations against controls, namely forms not susceptible to his theory but sharing other properties with the "test" forms such as part of speech, metrical configuration, and so on. The first scholar to look at controls was Franklin Eugene Horowitz. Horowitz noted that for example all 65 occurrences of Vedic suvīra- "well-heroed" do occur in line-initial position or follow a heavy syllable (as if in accord with Edgerton's converse), but exactly the same thing is true of e.g. supatrá- "having beautiful wings" (which can have nothing to do with Edgerton's law). And indeed such skewing in distribution is pervasive in Vedic vocabulary: śatam "100", and dozens of other forms with no bearing on Edgerton's law, have exactly the same strong preference for not following a word ending with a short vowel that e.g. śiras "head" does, presumably by reason of beginning with a single consonant followed by a light syllable.

A second difficulty has emerged much more recently: The actual passages from the Rigveda cited in Edgerton's two large articles in 1934 and 1943 as examples of the effects of his theory in action seriously misrepresent the facts in all but a handful of cases. No more than three Rigvedic passages cited in the 1934 article, and none at all in 1943, actually support the claims of Edgerton's law regarding word-initial sequences. This lies well within the operation of pure chance. It has been shown also that the apparent success of Lindeman's more modest claims are not without problems, too, such as the limitation of the reliable examples to semivowels (the glides *y and *w) even though such alternations in the other four consonants should have left robust outcomes (for example, a disyllabic form of prá "forth, away" should have been much more frequent than the monosyllable, which would have occurred only after a word ending in a short vowel; but there is no evidence for such a disyllabic form as **pirá, in Vedic or any other form of Indic); and that the syllabified alternants (e.g. *diyēws) are rarer than they should be: they account for only fifteen to twenty percent of the total: they should account for at least eighty percent, since the monosyllabic form would have originally occurred, like prá, only after a word ending in a short vowel.

Further, only the *diyēws alternants have a "distribution": the *dyēws shapes show no sensitivity to phonetic environment at all. (And even that disyllabic "distribution" can be inexplicable: disyllabic dyāus in the Rigveda always and only, with one exception, occurs in line-initial position, i.e., in only one of the four environments calling for syllabification of the resonant. Nothing in Lindeman's theory accounts for this striking distribution.)

== Sievers's law in Germanic ==
Within the context of Indo-European, Sievers's law is generally held to be one-way. That is, it applied only to create syllabic resonants from nonsyllabics after heavy syllables, but not the other way around after light syllables. In Proto-Germanic, however, the law came to be applied in both directions, with PIE syllabic *-iy- becoming nonsyllabic *-y- after light syllables. As a consequence, suffixal -j- and -ij- came to be in complementary distribution in Proto-Germanic, and were perceived as allophonic variants of the same suffix with the former following light syllables and the latter, heavy. Following the loss of j intervocalically, -ī- (from earlier -iji-) was also complementary to -i- in inflected forms.

The alternation is preserved in a number of the older languages. In addition to the Gothic nouns cited above, Gothic strong adjectives show a light suffix -ji- following a light stem, yielding the nominative singular masculine midjis "middle", while a heavy suffix -ī- (from -iji-/-ija-) follows a long stem: wilþeis /wilþīs/ "wild".

In Old Norse, nonsyllabic -j- is preserved word-medially, but syllabic -ij- is lost like all other medial-syllable vowels. This is seen in class 1 weak verbs, which end in -ja (from Germanic *-janą) following a short stem, but in -a (from Germanic *-ijaną) following a long stem. Word-finally, the distribution is reversed. For example, following the loss of final -ą, this left neuter ja-stem nouns with syllabic -i (from *-iją) after long stems but no ending (from *-ją) after short stems.

The West Germanic languages such as English largely lost the alternation because of the effects of the West Germanic gemination, but the gemination itself was conditioned only by -j- and not by -ij-, so that the alternation is indirectly preserved. There is also some evidence that the alternation was preserved and adapted to the new syllable structure that resulted from the gemination. In the oldest attested languages, medial syllabic -ij- tends to be lost in the same way as in Old Norse, while nonsyllabic -j- (occurring only after -r-, which was not geminated) is preserved. Compare for example:

- Originally heavy syllable: Old English fēran, Old High German fuoren, Old Norse fœra < Proto-Germanic *fōrijaną
- Originally light syllable with gemination: Old English settan, Old High German sezzen, Old Norse setja < Proto-Germanic *satjaną
- Originally light syllable with no gemination: Old English werian, Old High German werien, Old Norse verja < Proto-Germanic *warjaną

It has been argued that Sievers's law is actually an innovation of Germanic. The reasons for this are two distinct innovations pertaining to Sievers's law outcomes. The first is that the law works in both directions, not only yielding *-iya- following long stems, but instigating the reverse, decrementing etymological *-iya- to *-ya- following short stems. The second is an enlarged environment for the transformation. In Germanic, the syllabic shape *-iy- is found not only after heavy syllables, as in Vedic, but also after some polysyllabic stems. This is quite unlike anything in Indic.

The imposed conditions for the Sievers's law reversal are specifically Germanic, not Proto-Indo-European. Thus the following two verb forms show normal Germanic distributions in good order: Proto-Germanic *wurkīþi "(s)he works", *wurkijanþi "they work" become Gothic waurkeiþ /workīþ/, waurkjand (Gothic makes no distinction between -ij- and -j- in writing); and Proto-Germanic *satiþi "(s)he sets", *satjanþi "they set" become Gothic satjiþ, satjand. But the forms in their Proto-Indo-European shape were *wr̥g-yé-ti, *wr̥g-yó-nti and *sod-éye-ti, *sod-éyo-nti respectively. Without Sievers's influence these would pass etymologically into Germanic as **wurkiþi, **wurkjanþi and **satīþi, **satijanþi. The regular Germanic evolution of *ur from *r̥ made a light root syllable heavy, and thus *wr̥g- > *wurk- created a triggering environment for a heavy suffix, *-iji-/*-ī-, yielding Gothic waurkeiþ. The opposite occurred regarding satjiþ, where the etymological *-iji-/*-ī- (PIE *-eye-) was decremented to *-i- because the light syllable created the environment for a light suffix. So, a Proto-Germanic *satijiþi was turned to *satjiþi by Sievers's reversal, which in turn was simplified prehistorically to *satiþi. Gothic re-inserts the -j- via analogy, yielding satjiþ (contrast Old English bideð, which does not re-insert the -j- therefore not yielding **biddeð). Hence, not only are Proto-Indo-European structures not needed to account for the facts of Germanic, they actually get in the way.

Donald Ringe, in his book "From Proto-Indo-European to Proto-Germanic", characterizes the origins of the different features as follows:

1. Sievers's law operates as a "surface filter"; therefore the objection concerning PIE *wr̥g-yé-ti vs. Proto-Germanic *wurkīþi is not valid. That is, Sievers's law was not a sound change that took place at some particular time, but rather a phonological law that remained in the grammar of the language over time and operated on the output of various phonological processes. When PIE *r̥ changed to *ur in Proto-Germanic, Sievers's law automatically changed forms such as *wurg-yé-ti to *wurg-iyé-ti.
2. The converse of Sievers's law – which changes *iy to *y after a light syllable – was indeed a Germanic innovation that did not apply to PIE. Essentially, Proto-Germanic inherited Sievers's law from PIE and then extended it to apply in both directions. This answers the concern about *satiþi vs. *sod-éye-ti.
3. The extension of the Sievers's-law variant *-iy- to polysyllabic as well as heavy-syllable stems was another Germanic innovation.

Sievers's law in Germanic was clearly conditioned on morphological grounds as well as phonological, since suffixes were treated as separate words if they were recognised as separate morphological segments. For example, the suffix *-atjaną had a nonsyllabic -j- because the preceding -at- was light, as in Old English -ettan, where the gemination is evidence for -j-. On the other hand, *-ārijaz had -ij- because the syllable -ār- was heavy, as in Gothic -areis, which would have been *-arjis if the suffix had contained -j- instead. This happened even though in fully formed words these -j- and -ij- would have been preceded by two syllables. Examples of the opposite - that is, multiple-syllable stems that were not segmentable - can also be found. *hamiþiją ("shirt") clearly contained -ij-, showing that *hamiþ- in its entirety was analysed as the stem, rather than just *-iþ- since there was no such suffix in Proto-Germanic. This is evidenced by the Old High German hemidi, where *hemiddi would be expected if the original form had -j-.

== See also ==
- Glossary of sound laws in the Indo-European languages
