= Grammatischer Wechsel =

German term in historical linguistics

In historical linguistics, the German term grammatischer Wechsel ("grammatical alternation") refers to the effects of Verner's law when they are viewed synchronically within the paradigm of a Germanic verb.

== Overview ==
According to Grimm's law, the Proto-Indo-European (PIE) voiceless stops *p, *t, *k and *kʷ usually became Proto-Germanic *ɸ, *θ (dental fricative), *x and *xʷ (velar fricative). Karl Verner identified the principle (Verner's law) that they instead become the voiced consonants *ƀ, *đ, *ǥ, *ǥʷ if they were immediately preceded within the same word by a syllable that was unaccented in Proto-Indo-European. (The Proto-Germanic phonemes *ƀ, *đ, *ǥ, *ǥʷ are thought to have had multiple phonetic realizations depending on the context (allophones), being phonetic voiced plosives [b d g gʷ] in some contexts, and voiced fricatives [β ð ɣ ɣʷ] in other contexts.) Furthermore, PIE *s, which usually came into Germanic unchanged, became *z in this position. This *z later became North and West Germanic *r.

Consequently, five pairs of consonants emerged, each pair representing a single PIE phoneme. The following table shows the precise developments from Proto-Indo-European through Proto-Germanic to Old Norse, West Germanic, Old English, Old High German and Middle Dutch. It is mainly in the dentals that those languages show significant differences in the patterns of grammatischer Wechsel. Note that the table lists only the outcome of word-internal consonants, since word-initial consonants were generally not affected by Verner's law.

| PIE | PG | ON | WG | OE | OHG | MDu | Notes |
| *p | *ɸ | f | *ɸ | f/v | f | f/v | By GL *p→*ɸ. |
| *p | *ƀ | f | *β | f/v | b | f/v | By VL *p→*ƀ. |
| *t | *θ | ð | *θ | θ/ð | d | d | By GL *t→*θ. Then θ→d German and Dutch. |
| *t | *đ | ð | *d | d | t | d | By VL *t→*ð→*d. Then *d→t in German. |
| *k | *x | – | *x/h | x/- | x/h | x/- | By GL *k→*x. x→h before a vowel. h is then lost between vowels in Old English and Dutch. |
| *k | *ǥ | ɣ | *ɣ | j/ɣ | ɡ | x/ɣ | By VL *k→*ɣ. Then ɣ→j in English and ɣ→ɡ in German, though all 3 use spelling ⟨g⟩. |
| *kʷ | *xʷ | – | *x/h | x/- | x/h | x/- | Parallel to *k. |
| *kʷ | *ǥʷ | ɣ | *ɣ | j/ɣ | ɡ | x/ɣ | Parallel to *k, but *ɣʷ had split into *ɣ and *w by late Proto-Germanic. |
| *kʷ | *ǥʷ | w/- | *w | w | w | w | |
| *s | *s | s | *s | s/z | s | s/z | GL leaves s unaffected; allophone [z] in English. |
| *s | *z | r | *r | r | r | r | By VL s→z→r. |

In Old English, the Proto-Germanic voiceless fricatives *θ, *ɸ, and *s developed into voiced allophones, [ð], [v] and [z], when they were word-internal between voiced sounds, and in Middle Dutch also when word-initial; see: Pronunciation of English ⟨th⟩. In Old High German, Proto-Germanic *ƀ, *đ, *ǥ developed to /b, t, ɡ/ according to the High German consonant shift, and *θ became /d/. In Dutch, the idiosyncrasies of the shift mean that Dutch (like German) experiences the shift þ→d but (like English) does not experience the shift d→t; thus, the dental variety of grammatischer Wechsel is eliminated in Dutch by the normal operation of sound laws. Likewise, the outcomes of Proto-Germanic *φ and *ƀ merged in almost all Germanic languages (except Gothic and German), eliminating this variety early on. In Old Norse, *θ and *đ likewise merged altogether.

== Within verb paradigms ==
Grammatischer Wechsel is the phenomenon that a verb that in PIE had a stem ending in one of those phonemes displays a differing reflex in different parts of the paradigm, a result of the movable nature of accent in PIE. The Germanic past tense derives from the PIE perfect aspect, which was always athematic and therefore almost always had a shift of accent between the singular indicative (where it was on the root syllable) and the remaining forms including the past participle (where it was on the ending). However, the perfect aspect was present in only primary underived verbs and so any derived verbs lacked perfect forms altogether. The latter verbs formed the base of the Germanic weak verbs and did not inherit the accent shift and so the alternation itself affects only Germanic strong verbs.

A process of levelling has meant that there are only a few examples in the modern languages. In East and North Germanic, the levelling was almost complete before the earliest records, but Gothic and Old Norse had traces of grammatischer Wechsel. In Old English, too, the levelling had already begun to the extent that in some verbs the preterite singular had taken the consonant of the preterite plural. The only surviving example in Modern English is was-were, but a trace can also be seen in the adjective forlorn, which reflects the old participle of the verb to lose, or sodden, which is originally a participle of seethe. This latter is parallelled by German sieden, sott, gesotten. German also features d-t in leiden, litt, gelitten ("to suffer") and schneiden, schnitt, geschnitten ("to cut"). One example of h:g is ziehen, zog, gezogen ("to pull"). All other cases have been levelled. Apart from the English copula mentioned above, the only occurrences of s-r in the modern languages are in Dutch: verliezen, verloor, verloren ("to lose") and verkiezen, verkoos, verkoren ("to choose").

Here are some examples:

*f ~ *b (no examples in the modern languages)
*þ ~ *d (survives in modern German)
Old English: cweþan (cwiþþ) cwæþ – cwǣdon cweden ("to say", cf. quoth)
Old English: sēoþan (sīeþþ) sēaþ – sudon soden ("to boil", cf. seethe)
Modern German: schneiden – schnitt geschnitten ("to cut")

*h ~ *g (survives in modern Dutch and modern German)
Middle High German: zîhen zêch – zigen gezigen ("to upbraid")
Old English: þeon (þīehþ) þāh – þigon þigen ("to prosper", cf. German gedeihen)
Modern Dutch: slaan sla - sloeg geslagen ("to hit", Dutch lost intervocalic h)
Modern German: ziehen - zog, gezogen ("to pull", the intervocalic h is not pronounced)

*hw ~ *gw/w/g (survives in modern Dutch)
Old English: sēon seah – sāwon sewen ("to see", Old English lost intervocalic h)

(Remnant in Modern English spelling: see – saw)

Old High German: sehan sah – sāgun gisehan/gisewan
Modern Dutch: zien zie gezien – zag zagen ("to see", Dutch lost intervocalic h)
Modern Swedish: se ser – såg

*s ~ *z (Note: Intervocalic /z/ later became /r/ in all surviving Germanic languages. See Rhotacism (sound change)#Germanic languages.) (survives in modern Dutch, and in the English copula)
Old English: wesan, wæs – wǣron ("to be")

Modern English: was – were

Old English: cēosan, cēas – curon coren ("to choose")
Old English: frēosan, frēas – fruron froren ("to freeze")
Old Norse (early): vesa, vas – váru ("to be", the -s- was soon replaced by -r- analogically)
Old Norse: frjósa, frýss – fruru, frorinn ("to freeze")
Modern Dutch: wezen, wees, was – waren ("to be")
Modern Dutch: verliezen, verlies – verloor, verloren ("to lose")
Modern Dutch: vriezen, vries – vroor, gevroren ("to freeze")

NB. Not all consonant apophony in Germanic verbs is caused by grammatischer Wechsel. The consonant alternation in certain weak verbs that typically goes along with the Rückumlaut phenomenon (think:thought, German denken:dachte) is a result of a later development in Germanic known as the Germanic spirant law. Likewise, the terminal devoicing that produces a fortis-lenis alternation in Dutch (wrijven:wreef) is an unrelated historical phenomenon.

== Between strong verbs and derived causatives ==
In PIE, causative verbs (meaning "to cause to") were derived from verb roots with a suffix *-éye-, and the root vowel was changed to the o-grade. Verbs with this suffix eventually became part of the first weak class (*-jan verbs). This suffix always bore the accent, and the verb root never did, while in regular strong verbs the verb root was accented in the present tense. This caused Verner alternation between the original verbs and the causative verbs derived from them.

Examples are numerous in the older languages but are less frequent today, because some levelling has occurred, and in some cases, one verb or the other was lost.

*f ~ *b
Although technically not a strong verb - causative pair, modern Dutch shows the alternation in a verb with the same underlying Proto-Germanic shape.

heffen ("to lift/raise", from the strong verb *habjaną) - hebben ("to have", from the weak verb *habjaną)

*þ ~ *d
Modern German: leiden ("to suffer, to undergo", originally "to go", from *līþaną) – leiten ("to lead", from *laidijaną)

*h ~ *g
Modern Icelandic: hlæja ("to laugh", from *hlahjaną) – hlægja ("to make laugh", from *hlōgijaną)

*hw ~ *gw/w/g (No attested examples within a single language)
Gothic þreihan ("to press", from *þrinhwaną) – German drängen ("to push", from *þrangwijaną)

*s ~ *z
Modern English: rise (from *rīsaną) – rear (from *raizijaną)
Modern Dutch: genezen ("to heal", from *ganesaną) – generen ("to take care of oneself", from *nazjaną)
Modern German: genesen ("to heal", from *ganesaną) – nähren ("to feed", from *nazjaną)

== In other parts of speech ==
The term Grammatischer Wechsel was originally applied to any pair of etymologically-related words that had different accent placement, including also Proto-Indo-European athematic nouns. The alternations in nouns were largely eliminated early on in Germanic, but a few cases exist of parallel forms being still preserved in different Germanic languages (such as English glass and Icelandic gler, an example of the s-z alternation). No attested language, old or modern, shows any alternation in noun paradigms, however.
