= Germanic verbs =

Verb form derived from common earlier Germanic languages

The Germanic language family is one of the language groups that resulted from the breakup of Proto-Indo-European (PIE). It in turn divided into North, West and East Germanic groups, and ultimately produced a large group of medieval and modern languages, most importantly: Danish, Norwegian, and Swedish (North); English, Dutch and German (West); and Gothic (East, extinct).

The Germanic verb system lends itself to both descriptive (synchronic) and historical (diachronic) comparative analysis. This overview article is intended to lead into a series of specialist articles discussing historical aspects of these verbs, showing how they developed out of PIE, and how they came to have their present diversity.

== Verb types ==
The Germanic verb system carried two innovations over the previous Proto-Indo-European verb system:

1. Simplification to two tenses: present (also conveying future meaning) and past (sometimes called "preterite" and conveying the meaning of all of the following English forms: "I did, I have done, I had done, I was doing, I have been doing, I had been doing").
2. Development of a new way of indicating the preterite and past participle, using a dental suffix.

Later Germanic languages developed further tenses periphrastically, that is, using auxiliary verbs, but the constituent parts of even the most elaborate periphrastic constructions are still only in either present or preterite tenses (or non-finite forms, compare I would have been doing, an English conditional perfect progressive with would in the preterite, the other three parts being non-finite).

Germanic verbs fall into two broad types, strong and weak. Elements of both are present in the preterite-present verbs. Despite various irregularities, most verbs fall into one of these categories. Suppletive verbs are completely irregular, being composed of parts of more than one Indo-European verb. There is one verb (*dōną 'to do') that is in a category of its own, based on an Indo-European "athematic" form, and having a "weak" preterite but a "strong" passive participle.

=== Strong verbs ===
Strong (or vocalic) verbs display vowel gradation or ablaut, that is, the past tense is marked by a change in the vowel in the stem syllable. Examples include:

Modern English:

- fall – fell – fallen
- sing – sang – sung

Old English:

- fallan – feoll – feollon – (ge)fallen (to fall)
- hātan – hēt – hēton – (ge)hāten (to be called)

Old High German:

- fallan – fiall – fiallun – (gi)fallan (to fall)
- heizan – hiaz – hiazun – (gi)heizan (to be called)

In the older languages, these verbs may also be reduplicating, that is, the past tense forms add a prefix with the same consonant as the first consonant of the stem syllable. An example in Gothic is lētan – laílōt – laílōtum – lētans (to have).

In Proto-Germanic, consonant alternations known as grammatischer Wechsel developed, as a result of Verner's law. This involves an originally regular change in the consonant at the end of the stem syllable. An example in modern Dutch is verliezen – verloor – verloren (to lose)

These are the direct descendants of the verb in Proto-Indo-European, and are paralleled in other Indo-European languages. Examples include:

- leipō – leloipa – elipon (Greek: to leave)
- fallō/fallere – fefellī – falsum (Latin: to cheat)

All Indo-European verbs that passed into Germanic as functioning verbs were strong, apart from the small group of irregular verbs discussed below. The preterite of strong verbs are the reflex of the Indo-European perfect. Because the perfect in late Indo-European was no longer simply stative, but began to be used especially of stative actions whose source was a completed action in the past (e.g., Greek), this anterior aspect of it was emphasized in a couple of Indo-European daughter languages (e.g., Latin), and so it was with Germanic that the perfect came to be used as a simple past tense. The semantic justification for this change is that actions of stative verbs generally have an implied prior inception. An example of this is the typical and widespread PIE stative *woida 'I know': one who "knows" something at some point in the past "came to know" it, much as the natural inference from noting someone in a sitting state is that a prior action of becoming seated occurred. The classical/Koine Greek perfect is essentially an early step in the development of the stative aspect to a past tense, being a hybrid of the two that emphasizes the ongoing (present/stative) effects of a past action (e.g., leloipa 'I have left"). Apparently it was this latter anterior respect that is responsible for the Indo-European perfect showing up as a past tense in Germanic, Italic, and Celtic.

The Indo-European perfect took o-grade in the singular and zero grade in the dual and plural. The Germanic strong preterite shows the expected Germanic development of short o to short a in the singular and zero grade in the plural; these make up the second and third principal parts of the strong verb. The Indo-European perfect originally carried its own set of personal endings, the remnants of which are seen in the Germanic strong preterite. The reduplication characteristic of the Indo-European perfect remains in a number of verbs (seen most clearly in Gothic), a distinction by which they are grouped together as the seventh class of Germanic strong verbs.

=== Weak verbs ===
Weak (or consonantal) verbs are those that use a dental suffix in the past or "preterite" tense, either -t- or -d-. In Proto-Germanic, such verbs had no ablaut—that is, all forms of all tenses were formed from the same stem, with no vowel alternations within the stem. This meant that weak verbs were "simpler" to form, and as a result strong verbs gradually ceased to be productive. Already in the earliest attested Germanic languages, strong verbs had become essentially closed classes and almost all new verbs were formed using one of the weak conjugations. This pattern later repeated itself—further sound changes meant that stem alternations appeared in some weak classes in some daughter languages, and these classes generally became unproductive. This happened, for example, in all of the West Germanic languages besides Old High German, where umlaut produced stem alternations in Class III weak verbs and, as a result, the class became unproductive and most of its verbs were transferred to other classes. Later, in Middle English, stem alternations between long and short vowels appeared in Class I weak verbs (examples are "meet" vs. "met" and "hear" vs. "heard"), and the class in its turn became unproductive, leaving the original Class II as the only productive verb class in Modern English.

In Proto-Germanic, there were five main classes of weak verbs:

- Class I verbs were formed with a suffix -j- (-i- in the past), e.g., Gothic satjan "to set" (Old English settan), sandjan "to send" (Old English sendan), sōkjan "to seek" (Old English sēcan). As shown in the Old English cognates, the -j- produced umlaut of the stem vowel in languages other than Gothic and then disappeared in most verbs in old Germanic languages other than Gothic and Old Saxon. (It also resulted in West Germanic gemination in some verbs, and palatalization of velar consonants in Old English.)
- Class II verbs were formed with a suffix -ō- (extended to -ōja- in the Ingvaeonic languages), e.g., Gothic salbōn "to anoint", Old English sealfian ← *salbōjan, compare "to salve".
- Class III stative verbs were formed with a suffix that was -ja- or -ai- (later -ē-) in the present and was null in the past, e.g., Old English hebban "to have" ← *habjan, past tense iċ hæfde "I had". The West Germanic languages outside of Old High German preserved this conjugation best, but in these languages the conjugation had become vestigial and had only four verbs in it. In other languages, it was merged with the Class III factitive verbs (see below) and significantly modified, e.g., Gothic haban, past tense ik habáida; Old High German habēn, past tense ih habēta.
- Class III factitive verbs were formed with a suffix that was -ā- or -ai- in the present and -a- in the past. This class merged with the Class III stative verbs in Gothic, Old High German and (mostly) Old Norse, but vanished in the other Germanic languages.
- Class IV verbs were formed with a suffix -n- (-nō- in the past), e.g. Gothic fullnan "to become full", past tense ik fullnōda. This class vanished in other Germanic languages; however, a significant number of cognate verbs appear as Class II verbs in Old Norse and as Class III verbs in Old High German.

=== Preterite-presents ===
The so-called preterite-present verbs are a small group of anomalous verbs in the Germanic languages in which the present tense shows the form of the strong preterite. The preterite of the preterite-present verbs is weak. As an example, take the third-person forms of modern German können "to be able to". Kann "can, am/is able to" (present tense) displays the vowel change and lack of a personal ending that would otherwise mark a strong preterite. Konnte "could, was able to" (preterite) displays the dental suffix of the weak preterites.

==== Sources ====
According to one "widely-held view", the preterite-present verbs are derived from the Proto-Indo-European perfect. The PIE perfect usually developed into a Germanic past tense. In the case of the preterite-presents, however, it evolved into a present-tense verb. Hence, the preterite-presents have a present-tense meaning on the one hand and a form that resembles that of a preterite or past-tense verb on the other.

Reconstructions of this process differ depending on how they interpret the PIE perfect. An example is the PIE perfect **woide. It is the ancestor of the Germanic preterite-presents meaning "(s/he) knows", represented here by Gothic wait:

- If the PIE perfect was stative-resultative, **woide can be glossed as "knows as a result of having seen" (the state of knowing results from a past action, i.e., seeing). In wait, the meaning "knows" was retained as a present tense. The reference to the past ("having seen") was lost semantically, but it was preserved etymologically in the past-tense form of the preterite-present. However, it is hard to identify similar combinations of past action and present state for some of the other preterite-presents. (The different semantic facets involved in this example can be observed in Ancient Greek oîda and Vedic veda "I know" and in Latin vīdī 'I saw' [probably an old root aorist]; compare also Russian videtʹ [to see] and vedatʹ [to know]).
- If the PIE perfect was purely stative, **woide can be glossed as "knows" (the state of knowing). The meaning "knows" was carried over as a present tense into wait. In this understanding, the preterite-presents constitute a retention of the non-past nature of the Indo-European perfect. Many linguists, however, do not share this view: "most accounts of the PIE perfect do not treat it as purely stative".

One response to these and other problems has been to argue that the preterite-presents are instead the descendants of a separate PIE stative category, from which the stative-resultative PIE perfect was also derived. This approach allows the preterite-presents to be treated as purely stative in origin without depriving the PIE perfect of a temporal element.

==== Preterite-presents in Proto-Germanic ====
The known verbs in Proto-Germanic (PGmc):

Infinitive	Meaning	Present verbal descendants	Class	Present singular	Present plural	Preterite
*witaną	"know"	Dutch weten, German wissen, Swedish veta, Norwegian Nynorsk vita, English wit	I	*wait	*witun	*wissē
*lizaną	"know"		I	*lais	*lizun	*listē
*aiganą	"have", "own"	Dutch eigenen, German eignen, Swedish äga, Norwegian Bokmål eie, Norwegian Nynorsk eige, English owe and ought	I	*aih	*aigun	*aihtē
*duganą	"be useful"	Dutch deugen/gedogen, German taugen, Swedish duga, Norwegian duga, English dow	II	*daug	*dugun	*duhtē
*unnaną	"grant"	Dutch gunnen, German gönnen, Swedish unna, Norwegian unna	III	*ann	*unnun	*unþē
*kunnaną	"know (how to)", later "can"	Dutch kunnen, German können, Norwegian kunne, Swedish kunna, English can	III	*kann	*kunnun	*kunþē
*þurbaną	"need"	Dutch (dated) durven, German dürfen, Norwegian Nynorsk turva, Swedish (archaic) torva/tarva, English (dialectal) tharf	III	*þarf	*þurbun	*þurftē
*durzaną	"dare"	Norwegian Nynorsk tora, English dare	III	*dars	*durzun	*durstē
*skulaną	"must", later "shall"	Dutch zullen, German sollen, Norwegian Nynorsk skulla, Swedish skola, English shall	IV	*skal	*skulun	*skuldē
*(ga)munaną	"think"	Icelandic muna, Norwegian Nynorsk muna, English northern dialectal mun	IV	*(ga)man	*(ga)munun	*(ga)mundē
*ganuganą	"be enough", "suffice"	German genügen	V	*ganah	*ganugun	*ganuhtē
*maganą	"can", later "may"	Dutch mogen, German mögen, Swedish må, English may	VI	*mag	*magun	*mahtē
*aganą	"fear"	Norwegian Nynorsk age	VI	*ag	*ōgun	*ahtē
*(ga)mōtaną	"may", later "must"	Dutch moeten, German müssen, Swedish måsta, English mote and must	VI	*(ga)mōt	*(ga)mōtun	*(ga)mōsē

==== Ablaut ====
The present tense has the form of a vocalic (strong) preterite, with vowel-alternation between singular and plural. A new weak preterite is formed with a dental suffix. The root shape of the preterite (in zero-grade) serves as the basis for the infinitive and past participle, thus Old English infinitive witan and past participle (ge)witen; this contrasts with all other Germanic verb types, in which the basis for those forms is the present stem.

	Proto-Germanic	Gothic	Old Saxon	Old English	Old High German	German	Dutch	English	Old Norse	Icelandic	Danish	Swedish	Norwegian Bokmål/Nynorsk
infinitive	*witaną	witan			wizzan	wissen	weten	[to] wit	vita		vide	veta	vite/vita
present 1st & 3rd sg	*wait		wēt	wāt	weiz	weiß	weet	wot	veit		ved	vet	vet, veit / veit
present 3rd pl	*witun			witon	wizzun	wissen	weten	wit	vitu	vita	ved	(veta)*	vet, veit / veit
preterite 1st & 3rd sg	*wissǭ, wissē	wissa		wisse	wissa	wusste	wist	wist	vissa, vissi	vissi	vidste	visste	visste
present participle	*witandz	witands	witandi	witende	wizzanti	wissend	wetend	witting**	vitandi		vidende	vetande	vitende/vitande
past participle	*wissaz		(gi)witan	(ge)witen	giwizzan	gewusst	geweten	wist**	vitat***	vitað***	vidst	vetat***	visst
*(Plural forms have been lost in modern central Swedish, but are retained in some dialects.) **(English gerund and present participle have merged, and often the past participle with the preterite.) ***(Actually, not the past participle but the supine.)

==== Personal endings ====
For the most part, the personal endings of the strong preterite are used for the present tense. In fact, in West Germanic the endings of the present tense of preterite-present verbs represent the original Indo-European perfect endings better than that subgroup's strong preterite verbs do: the expected Protogermanic strong preterite second-person singular form ending in -t was retained rather than replaced by the endings -e or -i elsewhere adopted for strong preterites in West Germanic.

The endings of the preterite (except for *kunnana) are the same as the endings of Class I weak verbs.

==== Subsequent developments ====
In modern English, preterite-present verbs are identifiable by the absence of an -s suffix on the third-person singular present tense form. Compare, for instance, he can with he sings (preterite: he sang); the present paradigm of can is thus parallel with the past tense of a strong verb. (See English modal verb.) In modern German there is also an ablaut shift between singular ich kann (I can) and plural wir können (we can). In the older stages of the Germanic languages (Old English, Middle High German) the past tense of strong verbs also showed different ablaut grades in singular and plural.

Many of the preterite-present verbs function as modal verbs (auxiliaries which are followed by a bare infinitive, without "to" in English, and which convey modality) and indeed most of the traditional modal verbs are preterite-presents. Examples are English must and shall/should, German dürfen (may), sollen (ought), mögen (like), and müssen (must). The early history of will (German wollen) is more complicated, as it goes back to an Indo-European optative mood, but the result in the modern languages is likewise a preterite-present paradigm.

=== Suppletive verbs ===
A small number of Germanic verbs show the phenomenon of suppletion, that is, they are made up from more than one stem. In English, there are two of these: to be and to go.

The copula (the verb to be and its equivalents in the other languages) has its forms from three or four IE roots (*h₁es-, *bʰuH-, *h₂wes-, and possibly *h₁er-.

The phenomenon of verb paradigms being composites of parts of different earlier verbs can best be observed in an example from recorded language history. The English verb to go was always suppletive, having the past tense ēode in Old English (this is believed to represent the original Proto-Germanic situation *gāną "to go" ~ *ijjǭ "I went", *ijjēdum "we went"). In the 15th century, however, this was replaced by a new irregular past tense went. In fact went is originally the past tense of the verb to wend (compare wend~went with send~sent); today wend has the regular past tense wended. In most other modern Germanic languages the verb "go" takes its preterite from the Proto-Germanic verb *ganganą "to walk" (e.g., German gehen, ging; Dutch gaan, ging; Swedish gå, gick).

=== IE optative ===
A special case is *wiljaną (to want, will), which has its present tense forms from the IE optative.

Today, the optative survives in the subjunctive of the Germanic languages. In Faroese, it is confined to the present tense and used only as a conjunctive.

== Regular and irregular verbs ==
When teaching modern languages, it is usually most useful to have a narrow definition of a "regular verb" and treat all other groups as irregular. See the article irregular verb. Thus for example, most text books for learning English or German treat all strong verbs as irregular, and only the most straightforward weak verb counts as regular. In historical linguistics, however, regular patterns are examined diachronically, and verbs tend only to be described as "irregular" when such patterns cannot be found. Most of the supposedly "irregular" Germanic verbs belong to historical categories that are regular within their own terms. However, the suppletive verbs are irregular by any standard, and for most purposes the preterite-presents can also count as irregular. Beyond this, isolated irregularities occur in all Germanic languages in both the strong and the weak verb system.

== See also ==
=== General ===
- Verb
- Regular verb
- Irregular verb
- Copula
- Principal parts
- Infinitive
- Past tense
- Present tense
- Future tense
- Suppletion

=== Specialist subsidiary and related articles ===
- Germanic weak verb
- Germanic strong verb
- Indo-European copula
- Go (verb)

=== The verb in particular Germanic languages ===
- English grammar
- English verbs
- English irregular verbs
- Wiktionary appendix: Irregular English verbs
- German verbs
- de:Liste starker Verben (deutsche Sprache)
- de:Liste starker Verben (bairische Sprache)
- Dutch conjugation

=== Other aspects of Germanic verbs ===
- Indo-European ablaut
- Germanic Umlaut
- Verner's law
- Grammatischer Wechsel

== General references ==
- Bennett, William Holmes (1980). An Introduction to the Gothic Language. New York: Modern Language Association of America.
- Campbell, A. (1959). Old English Grammar. London: Oxford University Press.
- Gallée, Johan Hendrik (1910). Altsächsische Grammatik (in German) (2nd ed.). Halle (Saale): Max Niemeyer Verlag. LCCN 12005859. OCLC 3128438. OL 6541088M. Wikidata Q131582014.
- Gordon, E.V. (1927). An Introduction to Old Norse. London: Oxford University Press.
- Heuser, Wilhelm (1903). Altfriesisches Lesebuch mit Grammatik und Glossar. Heidelberg: Carl Winter's Universitätsbuchhandlung.
- Kroonen, Guus (2013). Etymological Dictionary of Proto-Germanic. Leiden Indo-European Etymological Dictionary Series. Vol. 11. Brill Academic Publishers. ISBN 978-90-04-18340-7.
- Ringe, Don (2008). From Proto-Indo-European to Proto-Germanic. Oxford: OUP. ISBN 978-0-19-955229-0.
- Skeat, Walter William (1868). A Moeso-Gothic glossary. London: Asher & Co.
- Voyles, Joseph B. (1992). Early Germanic Grammar. San Diego: Academic Press. ISBN 978-0-12-728270-1.
- Wright, Joseph (1906). An Old High German Primer (Second ed.). Oxford: Clarendon Press.
- Wright, Joseph (1910). Grammar of the Gothic Language. Oxford: Clarendon Press.
- Wright, Joseph; Wright, Elizabeth Mary (1925). Old English Grammar (Third ed.). London: Oxford University Press.
