= Germanic strong verb =

Type of inflection in Germanic languages

In the Germanic languages, a strong verb is a verb that marks its past tense by means of changes to the stem vowel. A minority of verbs in any Germanic language are strong; the majority are weak verbs, which form the past tense by means of a dental suffix.

In modern English, strong verbs include sing (present I sing, past I sang, past participle I have sung) and drive (present I drive, past I drove, past participle I have driven), as opposed to weak verbs such as open (present I open, past I opened, past participle I have opened). Not all verbs with a change in the stem vowel are strong verbs, however: they may also be irregular weak verbs such as keep, kept, kept or bring, brought, brought. The key distinction is that the system of strong verbs has its origin in the earliest sound system of Proto-Indo-European, whereas weak verbs use a dental ending (in English usually -ed or -t) that developed later with the branching off of Proto-Germanic.

The "strong" vs. "weak" terminology was coined by the German philologist Jacob Grimm in the 1800s, and the terms "strong verb" and "weak verb" are direct translations of the original German terms starkes Verb and schwaches Verb.

== Origin and development ==
Strong verbs have their origin in the ancestral Proto-Indo-European (PIE) language. In PIE, vowel alternations called ablaut were frequent and occurred in many types of word, not only in verbs. The basic vowel was *e (e-grade), but, depending on what syllable of a word the stress fell on in PIE, this could change to *o (o-grade), or disappear altogether (zero grade). Both e and o could also be lengthened to ē and ō (lengthened grade). Thus ablaut turned short e into the following sounds:

zero	short	long
Ø	e	ē
Ø	o	ō

As the Germanic languages developed from PIE, they dramatically altered the Indo-European verbal system. PIE verbs could occur in three distinct aspects: the aorist, present and perfect aspect. The aorist originally denoted events without any attention to the specifics or ongoing nature of the event ("ate", perfective aspect). The present implied some attention to such details and was thus used for ongoing actions ("is eating", imperfective aspect). The perfect was a stative verb, and referred not to the event itself, but to the state that resulted from the event ("has eaten" or "is / has been eaten"). In Germanic, the aorist eventually disappeared and merged with the present, while the perfect took on a past tense meaning and became a general past tense. The strong Germanic present thus descends from the PIE present, while the past descends from the PIE perfect.

In the course of these changes, the different root-vowels caused by PIE ablaut became markers of tense. Thus in Germanic, *bʰer- became *beraną in the infinitive (e-grade); *bar in the past singular (o-grade); *bērun in the past plural (ē-grade); and *buranaz in the past participle (zero-grade).

In Proto-Germanic, the system of strong verbs was largely regular. As sound changes took place in the development of Germanic from PIE, the vowels of strong verbs became more varied, but usually in predictable ways, so in most cases all of the principal parts of a strong verb of a given class could be reliably predicted from the infinitive. Thus we can reconstruct Common Germanic as having seven coherent classes of strong verbs. This system continued largely intact in the first attested Germanic languages, notably Gothic, Old English, Old High German and Old Norse.

=== Gradual disappearance ===
As well as developing the strong verb system, Germanic also went on to develop two other classes of verbs: the weak verbs and a third, much smaller, class known as the preterite-present verbs, which are continued in the English auxiliary verbs, e.g. can/could, shall/should, may/might, must. Weak verbs originally derived from other types of word in PIE and originally occurred only in the present aspect. They did not have a perfect aspect, meaning that they came to lack a past tense form in Germanic once the perfect had become the past. Not having a past tense at all, they obviously also had no vowel alternations between present and past. To compensate for this, a new type of past tense was eventually created for these verbs by adding a -d- or -t- suffix to the stem. This is why only strong verbs have vowel alternations: their past tense forms descend from the original PIE perfect aspect, while the past tense forms of weak verbs were created later.

The development of weak verbs in Germanic meant that the strong verb system ceased to be productive; practically all new verbs were weak, and few new strong verbs were created. Over time, strong verbs tended to become weak across languages, so that the total number of strong verbs in Germanic languages has decreased over time.

The coherence of the strong verb system is still present in modern German, Dutch, Icelandic and Faroese. For example, in German and Dutch, strong verbs are consistently marked with a past participle in -en, while weak verbs have a past participle in -t in German and -t or -d in Dutch. In English, however, the original regular strong conjugations have largely disintegrated, with the result that in modern English grammar, a distinction between strong and weak verbs is less useful than a distinction between "regular" and "irregular" verbs. Thus, the verb to help, which used to be conjugated help-holp-holpen, is now help-helped-helped. The reverse phenomenon, whereby a weak verb becomes strong by analogy, is rare.

Some verbs, which might be termed "semi-strong", have formed a weak preterite but retained the strong participle, or rarely vice versa. This type of verb is most common in Dutch:

- lachen lachte (formerly loech) gelachen ("to laugh")
- vragen vroeg (formerly vraagde) gevraagd ("to ask")

An instance of this phenomenon in English is swell, swelled, swollen (though swelled is also found for the past participle, and the older strong form swole persists in some dialects as the preterite and past participle and has found new use in recent years.).

== Conjugation ==
As an example of the conjugation of a strong verb, we may take the Old English class 2 verb bēodan, "to offer" (cf. English "bid").

This has the following forms:

Infinitive	Supine	Present Indicative	Present Subjunctive	Past Indicative	Past Subjunctive	Imperative	Past participle
bēodan	tō bēodenne	ic bēode þū bīetst hē bīett wē bēodaþ gē bēodaþ hīe bēodaþ	ic bēode þū bēode hē bēode wē bēoden gē bēoden hīe bēoden	ic bēad þū bude hē bēad wē budon gē budon hīe budon	ic bude þū bude hē bude wē buden gē buden hīe buden	– bēode! – – bēodaþ!, bēode gē! –	geboden

While the inflections are more or less regular, the vowel changes in the stem are not predictable without an understanding of the Indo-European ablaut system, and students have to learn five "principal parts" by heart. For this verb they are bēodan, bīett, bēad, budon, geboden. These are:

1. The infinitive: bēodan. The same vowel is used through most of the present tense. In most verbs (other than classes 6 and 7), this represents the original ablaut e-grade.
2. The present tense 3rd singular: bīett. The same vowel is used in the 2nd singular. In many verbs, this has the same vowel as part 1. When it is distinct, as here, it is always derived from part 1 by Umlaut. For this reason, some textbooks do not treat it as a principal part.
3. The preterite (i.e. past indicative) 1st singular: bēad, which is identical to the 3rd singular. In this verb, part 3 comes from a PIE o-grade.
4. The preterite plural: budon. In West Germanic, the same vowel is used in the 2nd singular. In this verb, part 4 comes from a PIE zero-grade.
5. The past participle: geboden. This vowel is used only in the participle. In some verbs, part 5 is a discrete ablaut grade, but in this class 2 verb it is derived from part 4 by an a-mutation.

== Strong verb classes ==
Germanic strong verbs are commonly divided into seven classes, based on the type of vowel alternation. This is in turn based mostly on the type of consonants that follow the vowel. The Anglo-Saxon scholar Henry Sweet gave names to the seven classes:

1. The "drive" conjugation
2. The "choose" conjugation
3. The "bind" conjugation
4. The "bear" conjugation
5. The "give" conjugation
6. The "shake" conjugation
7. The "fall" conjugation

However, they are normally referred to by numbers alone.

In Proto-Germanic, the common ancestor of the Germanic languages, the strong verbs were still mostly regular. The classes continued largely intact in Old English and the other older historical Germanic languages: Gothic, Old High German and Old Norse. However, idiosyncrasies of the phonological changes led to a growing number of subgroups. Also, once the ablaut system ceased to be productive, there was a decline in the speakers' awareness of the regularity of the system. That led to anomalous forms and the six big classes lost their cohesion. This process has advanced furthest in English, but in some other modern Germanic languages (such as German), the seven classes are still fairly well preserved and recognisable.

The reverse process in which anomalies are eliminated and subgroups reunited by the force of analogy is called "levelling", and it can be seen at various points in the history of the verb classes.

In the later Middle Ages, German, Dutch and English eliminated a great part of the old distinction between the vowels of the singular and plural preterite forms. The new uniform preterite could be based on the vowel of the old preterite singular, on the old plural, or sometimes on the participle. In English, the distinction remains in the verb "to be": I was, we were. In Dutch, it remains in the verbs of classes 4 & 5 but only in vowel length: ik brak (I broke – short a), wij braken (we broke – long ā). In German and Dutch it also remains in the present tense of the preterite presents. In Limburgish there is a little more left. E.g. the preterite of to help is (weer) hólpe for the plural but either (ich) halp or (ich) hólp for the singular.

In the process of development of English, numerous sound changes and analogical developments have fragmented the classes to the extent that most of them no longer have any coherence: only classes 1, 3 and 4 still have significant subclasses that follow uniform patterns.

Before looking at the seven classes individually, the general developments that affected all of them will be noted. The following phonological changes that occurred between Proto-Indo-European and Proto-Germanic are relevant for the discussion of the ablaut system.

- The development of grammatischer Wechsel as a result of Verner's law (the voicing of fricatives after an unstressed vowel). This created variations in the consonant following the ablaut vowel.
- When the zero grade appears before l, r, m or n, the vowel u was inserted, effectively creating a new "u-grade".
- o → a (also oy → ai, ow → au).
- e → i when i, ī or j followed in the next syllable. This change is known as umlaut, and was extended to affect other vowels in most later languages.
- ey → ī as a result of the above.
- e → i before m or n followed by another consonant. This had the effect of splitting class 3 into 3a and 3b.

In West Germanic, the 2nd person singular past indicative uses the vowel of Part 3. Its ending is also an -i of unclear origin, rather than the expected -t < PIE *-th₂e of North and East Germanic, which suggests that this state of affairs is an innovation.

=== Classes 1 to 6 ===
The first 5 classes appear to continue the following PIE ablaut grades:

Class	Part 1	Part 2	Part 3	Part 4
1, 2, 3	e	o	zero	
4	e	o	ē	zero
5	e	o	ē	e

Except for the apparent ē-grade in part 3 of classes 4 and 5, these are in fact straightforward survivals of the PIE situation.

The standard pattern of PIE is represented in Germanic by classes 1, 2, and 3, with the present (part 1) in the e-grade, past indicative singular (part 2) in the o-grade, and remaining past (part 3) and past participle (part 4) in the zero grade. The differences between classes 1, 2, and 3 arise from semivowels coming after the root vowel, as shown in the table below.

As can be seen, the e-grade in part 1 and o-grade in part 2 are shared by all of these five classes. The difference between them is in parts 3 and 4:

- In classes 1 and 2, the semivowel following the vowel was converted in the zero grade into a full vowel.
- In class 3 and the past participle of class 4, there was no semivowel but there were PIE syllabic resonants which developed in Germanic to u plus resonant; thus u became the Germanic sign of these parts. There is some evidence that this may have been the original behaviour of the past nonsingular / nonindicative of class 4 as well: to wit, preterite-presents whose roots have the class 4 shape show u outside the present indicative singular, such as *man- ~ *mun- "to remember", *skal- ~ *skul- "to owe".
- In class 5, the zero grade of the past participle had probably been changed to e-grade already in PIE, because these verbs had combinations of consonants that were phonotactically illicit as a word-initial cluster, as they would be in the zero grade.
- The *ē in part 3 of classes 4 and 5 is not in fact a PIE lengthened grade but arose in Germanic. Ringe suggests that it was analogically generalised from the inherited part 3 of the verb *etaną "to eat" before it had lost its reduplicant syllable, PIE *h₁eh₁d- regularly becoming Germanic *ēt-.

Class 6 appears in Germanic with the vowels a and ō. PIE sources of the a vowel included *h₂e, *o, and a laryngeal between consonants; (Note: Examples: *aka- < *h₂ego- ("to drive"), *mala- < *molh₂o- ("to grind"), *habja- ("to lift") < *kh₂pio- ("to seize"). See Ringe (2006), p. 188.) possibly in some cases the a may be an example of the a-grade of ablaut, though the existence of such a grade is controversial. It is not clear exactly how the ō is to be derived from an earlier ablaut alternant in PIE, but believable sources include contraction of the reduplicant syllable in PIE *h₂-initial verbs, or o-grades of verbs with interconsonantal laryngeal. In any event, within Germanic the resulting a ~ ō behaved as just another type of vowel alternation.

In Proto-Germanic, this resulted in the following vowel patterns:

Class	Part 1	Part 2	Part 3	Part 4	Verb meaning	Usual PIE origin
1	*rīdaną	*raid	*ridun	*ridanaz	to ride	Vowel + y/i.
2a	*freusaną	*fraus	*fruzun	*fruzanaz	to freeze	Vowel + w/u.
2b	*lūkaną	*lauk	*lukun	*lukanaz	to close, to shut	Arose in analogy to Class 1.
3a	*bindaną	*band	*bundun	*bundanaz	to bind	Vowel + m or n + another consonant.
3b	*werþaną	*warþ	*wurdun	*wurdanaz	to become	Vowel + l or r + another consonant.
4	*beraną	*bar	*bērun	*buranaz	to bear	Vowel + l, r, m or n + no other consonant.
5	*lesaną	*las	*lēzun	*lezanaz	to gather	Vowel + any consonant other than y, w, l, r, m or n.
6	*alaną	*ōl	*ōlun	*alanaz	to grow, to mature	Vowel + a single consonant, if the present stem had a or o in late PIE.

- Class 2b is of unknown origin, and does not seem to reflect any PIE ablaut pattern.
- In class 3, there are also a few cases where the vowel is followed, at least in Proto-Germanic, by two consonants, neither of which is a nasal or a liquid. Examples: *brestaną "to burst", *þreskaną "to thresh" *fehtaną "to fight". All but one have a nasal or a liquid in front of the vowel. This will have become syllabic and resulted regularly in u before the nasal or liquid, which was then metathesised on the analogy of the remaining principal parts. E.g. part 3 of *brestaną will have been *bʰr̥st- > *burst-, reformed to *brust-.
- Similarly, class 6 includes some cases where the vowel is followed by two obstruents, like *wahsijaną "to grow".
- In classes 5, 6 and 7, there is also a small subgroup called "j-presents". These form their present tense with an extra -j-, which causes umlaut in the present where possible. In West Germanic, it also causes the West Germanic gemination.

=== Class 7 ===
The forms of class 7 were very different and did not neatly reflect the standard ablaut grades found in classes 1–6. Instead of (or in addition to) vowel alternations, this class displayed reduplication of the first consonants of the stem in the past tense.

It is generally believed that reduplication was once a feature of all Proto-Indo-European perfect-aspect forms. It was then lost in most verbs by Proto-Germanic times due to haplology. However, verbs with vowels that did not fit in the existing pattern of alternation retained their reduplication. Class 7 is thus not really one class, but can be split into several subclasses based on the original structure of the root, much like the first five classes. The first three subclasses are parallel with classes 1–3 but with e replaced with a: Class 7a is parallel to class 1, class 7b to class 2, and class 7c to class 3.

The following is a general picture of the Proto-Germanic situation as reconstructed by Jasanoff. Earlier reconstructions of class 7 were generally based mostly on Gothic evidence.

Subclass	Part 1	Part 2	Part 3	Part 4	Verb meaning	Root pattern
7a	*haitaną	*hegait	*hegitun	*haitanaz	to call	a + i
7b	*hlaupaną *stautaną	*heglaup *stestaut	*heglupun *stestutun	*hlaupanaz *stautanaz	to leap to push, to bump	a + u
7c	*haldaną *fanhaną	*hegald *febanh	*heguldun *febungun	*haldanaz *fanganaz	to hold to catch	a + l, r, m or n + another consonant (if no other consonant follows, the verb belongs to class 6)
7d	*lētaną *sēaną	*lelōt *sezō	*lel-tun *sez-un	*lētanaz *sēanaz	to allow, to let to sow	ē
7e	*blōtaną *grōaną	*beblōt *gegrō	*beblō?tun (Note: Jasanoff (2007) actually refuses to reconstruct a vowel grade for the 3rd principal part of *blōtaną (he says doing so would be "foolhardy").) *gegr-un	*blōtanaz *grōanaz	to sacrifice to grow	ō

The situation sketched above did not survive intact into any of the Germanic languages. It was changed significantly, but rather differently in Gothic on the one hand, and in the Northwest Germanic languages on the other.

==== Gothic ====
Reduplication was retained in Gothic, with the vowel ai inserted. However, as in all other strong verbs, consonant alternations were almost eliminated in favour of the voiceless alternants. The present and past singular stem was extended to the plural, leaving the reduplication as the only change in the stem between the two tenses. The vowel alternation was retained in a few class 7d verbs, but eliminated otherwise by generalising the present tense stem throughout the paradigm. The verb lētan "to allow" retained the past form lailōt with ablaut, while slēpan "to sleep" had the past tense form saislēp without it. The form saizlēp, with Verner-law alternation, is occasionally found as well, but it was apparently a relic formation with no other examples of alternation elsewhere.

==== Northwest Germanic ====
In the northwest Germanic languages, which include all modern surviving Germanic languages, class 7 was drastically remodelled. Reduplication was almost eliminated, except for a few relics, and new ablaut patterns were introduced. Many attempts have been made to explain this development. Jasanoff posits the following series of events within the history of Northwest Germanic:

1. Root-initial consonant clusters were transferred to the beginning of the reduplicating syllable, to preserve the same word onset across the paradigm. The clusters were simplified and reduced medially. (Compare Latin scindō ~ scicidī and spondeō ~ spopondī, which show the same development)
  *hlaupaną: *hehlaup, *hehlupun > *hlelaup, *hlelupun
  *stautaną: *stestaut, *stestutun > *stezaut, *stezutun
  *blōtaną: *beblōt, *beblutun > *blelōt, *blelutun
  *grōaną: *gegrō, *gegrōun > *grerō, *grerōun
  *swōganą: *sezwōg, *sezwōgun > *swewōg, *sweugun (English sough)
2. Root compression:
  1. Based on the pattern of verbs such as singular *lelōt, *rerōd ~ plural *leltun, *rerdun, as well as verbs like singular *swewōg ~ plural *sweugun, the root vowel or diphthong was deleted in the past plural stem. The Germanic spirant law caused devoicing in certain consonants where applicable.
    *haitaną: *hegait, *hegitun > *hegait, *hehtun
    *bautaną: *bebaut, *bebutun > *bebaut, *beftun ("to beat")
    *hlaupaną: *hlelaup, *hlelupun > *hlelaup, *hlelpun
    *stautaną: *stezaut, *stezutun > *stezaut, *stestun
    *blōtaną: *blelōt, *blelutun > *blelōt, *bleltun
  2. In class 7c verbs, this resulted in consonant clusters that were not permissible (e.g. **hegldun); these clusters were simplified by dropping the root-initial consonant(s).
    *haldaną: *hegald, *heguldun > *hegald, *heldun
    *fanhaną: *febanh, *febungun > *febanh, *fengun
3. The past plural stem of class 7c verbs no longer appeared to be reduplicated because of the above change, and was extended to the singular. This created what appeared to be a new form of ablaut, with a in the present and e in the past plural.
  *haldaną: *hegald, *heldun > *held, *heldun
  *fanhaną: *febanh, *fengun > *feng, *fengun
4. This new form of ablaut was then extended to other classes, by alternating *a with *e in classes 7a and 7b, and *ā with *ē in class 7d (after Proto-Germanic *ē had become *ā in Northwest Germanic). In class 7a, this resulted in the vowel *ei, which soon merged with *ē (from Germanic *ē²).
  *haitaną: *hegait, *hehtun > *heit, *heitun > *hēt, *hētun
  *hlaupaną: *hlelaup, *hlelpun > *hleup, *hleupun
  *lātaną: *lelōt, *leltun > *lēt, *lētun
5. It is at this point that North and West Germanic begin to diverge.
  - In West Germanic, class 7e took *eu as the past stem vowel, by analogy with existing verbs with initial *(s)w- such as *wōpijaną, *weup(un) and *swōganą, *swewg(un).
    *blōtaną: *blelōt(un) > *bleut(un)
    *hrōpaną: *hrerōp(un) > *hreup(un) ("to cry, roop")
    *grōaną: *grerō(un) > *greu, *gre(u)wun
  - In North Germanic, class 7e instead took *ē as the past stem vowel, probably by analogy with class 7c which also had a long stem vowel.
    *blōtaną: *blelōt(un) > *blēt(un)

Stages 4 and 5 were not quite complete by the time of the earliest written records. While most class 7 verbs had replaced reduplication with ablaut entirely, several vestigial remains of reduplication are found throughout the North and West Germanic languages. Various other changes occurred later in the individual languages. *e in class 7c was replaced by *ē (> ia) in Old High German and Old Dutch, but by *eu (> ēo) in Old English.

The following "Late Proto-Northwest-Germanic" can be reconstructed as descendants of the earlier Proto-Germanic forms given above. Note that ē became ā in northwest Germanic.

Class	Part 1	Part 2	Part 3	Part 4
7a	*haitaną	*hēt	*hētun	*haitanaz
7b	*hlaupaną	*hleup	*hleupun	*hlaupanaz
7c	*haldaną	*held	*heldun	*haldanaz
7d	*rādaną	*rēd	*rēdun	*rādanaz
7e	*blōtaną	*bleut (West), *blēt (North)	*bleutun (West), *blētun (North)	*blōtanaz

== Proto-Germanic ==
The Proto-Germanic language most likely used more than 500 strong roots. Although some roots are speculative, the language can be reconstructed with the following strong roots based on the work of Elmar Seebold (1970), Robert Mailhammer (2007) and Guus Kroonen (2013). Proto-Germanic had aorist-present roots, a remnant of the aorist aspect found in Proto-Indo-European. These verbs used the former aorist as a present tense form. The aorist had a zero-grade vowel, like parts 3 and 4 of the perfect. So these verbs have an anomalous vowel in the present tense, they decline regularly otherwise.

- Class 1 with 110 roots: *bīdaną, *bītaną, *blīkaną, *dīaną, *dīganą, *dīkaną, *drībaną, *drītaną, *dwīnaną, *fīganą - *fīhaną, *fīsaną, *flīhaną, *frīsaną, *gīnaną, *glīaną, *glīdaną, *glīmaną, *glīnaną, *glītaną, *gnīdaną, *grīnaną, *grīpaną, *hlīdaną, *hnīgwaną - *hnīwaną - *hnīganą, *hnīpaną - *knīpaną, *hnītaną, *hrībaną, *hrīnaną, *hrītaną, *hwīnaną, *kībaną, *kīkaną, *kīnaną, *klībaną, *knīdaną, *krīaną, *krītaną, *kwīnaną, *kwīþaną, *lībaną, *līhwaną, *līþaną, *mīganą, *mīþaną, *nīþaną, *nīwaną, *pīpaną, *rīdaną, *rīfaną, *rīhaną, *rīkaną, *rīmaną, *rīpaną, *rīsaną, *rīstaną, *sīganą, *sīhwaną, *sīpaną, *sīþaną, *skīdaną, *skīnaną, *skītaną, *skrīhaną - *skrīaną, *skrībaną, *skrītaną, *skrīþaną, *slībaną, *slīdaną, *slīkaną, *slīpaną, *slītaną, *smītaną, *snīgwaną - *snīwaną, *snīkaną, *snīþaną, *spīwaną, *splītaną, *sprīþaną, *stīganą, *strībaną, *strīdaną, *strīkaną, *strīmaną, *swībaną, *swīganą, *swīkwaną, *swīnaną, *swīþaną, *tīhaną, *þīhaną, *þīnaną, *þrībaną, *þrīnaną, *þwīnaną, *þwītaną, *wīhaną, *wīkwaną, *wīpaną, *wīsaną, *wītaną, *wlītaną, *wrībaną, *wrīhaną, *wrīnaną, *wrītaną, *wrīþaną;

Aorist-present roots: *diganą, *stikaną, *wiganą;

- Class 2

2a with 72 roots: *beudaną, *beuganą^{b}, *bewwaną^{b}, *blewwaną, *breusaną, *breutaną, *breuþaną, *brewwaną, *dreuganą, *dreupaną^{b}, *dreusaną, *feukaną^{b}, *fleuganą, *fleuhaną, *fleutaną, *fneusaną, *freusaną, *freuþaną, *geubaną^{b}, *geupaną, *geusaną, *geutaną, *gleupaną^{b}, *greupaną^{b}, *greutaną, *heubaną, *hleutaną, *hneudaną, *hneupaną, *hneusaną, *hneutaną, *hnewwaną, *hreudaną, *hreupaną, *hreusaną, *hreutaną^{b}, *hrewwaną, *keusaną, *kewwaną, *kleubaną, *kreudaną^{b}, *kreukaną^{b}, *kreupaną^{b}, *kreustaną, *leudaną, *leuganą, *leukaną^{b}, *leusaną, *leustaną, *neutaną, *reudaną, *reufaną, *reukaną^{b}, *reutaną, *seukaną^{b}, *seuþaną, *skeubaną^{b}, *skeutaną, *sleupaną^{b}, *sleutaną^{b}, *smeuganą^{b}, *smeukaną^{b}, *snewwaną, *spreutaną^{b}, *steubaną^{b}, *steukan, *streukaną, *streupaną, *teuhaną, *þeutaną^{b}, *þleuhan, *þreutaną;
2b with 29 roots: *būganą^{a}, *dūbaną, *dūkaną, *drūpaną^{a}, *fūkaną^{a}, *gūbaną^{a}, *glūpaną^{a}, *grūpaną^{a}, *hūkaną, *hrūtaną^{a}, *krūdaną^{a}, *krūkaną^{a}, *krūpaną^{a}, *lūkaną^{a}, *lūtaną, *rūkaną^{a}, *sūganą, *sūkaną^{a}, *sūpaną*skūbaną, *slūkaną, *slūpaną^{a}, *slūtaną^{a}, *smūganą^{a}, *smūkaną^{a}, *sprūtaną^{a}, *stūbaną^{a}, *strūdaną, *þūtaną^{a};

- Class 3

3a with 78 roots: *bindaną, *brimmaną, *brinnaną, *dimbaną, *dingwaną, *dintaną, *drinkaną, *finkaną, *finþaną, *flinganą, *gimbaną, *ginnaną (*biginnaną), *gintaną, *glimmaną, *grimmaną, *grindaną, *hinkaną, *hinþaną, *hlimmaną, *hrimpaną, *hrindaną, *hrinkwaną, *kimbaną, *klimbaną, *klimpaną, *klinganą, *klinkwaną, *klinnaną, *krimmaną, *krimpaną, *kringaną, *krintaną, *kwinkaną, *limpaną, *lingwaną, *linnaną, *miskaną, *ninþaną, *rinnaną, *singwaną, *sinkwaną, *sinnaną, *sinþaną, *skrimbaną - *skrimmaną, *skrimpaną , *skrindaną , *skrinkwaną, *slimpaną , *slindaną, *slingwaną , *slinkaną, *slintaną , *spinnaną, *springaną - *sprinkaną, *sprintaną, *stinganą, *stinkwaną, *swimmaną, *swindaną, *swingwaną - *swinganą, *swinkaną, *tinganą, *tinhaną, *tinnaną, *tinþaną , *trimpaną , *trinnaną , *þindaną , *þinhaną, *þinsaną, *þrimmaną , *þrinhaną , *þrinhwaną, *þrintaną , *þwinganą , *windaną, *winnaną, *wringaną;
3b with 75 roots: *belganą, *bellaną, *berganą, *berkaną, *bregdaną, *brestaną, *delbaną, *derbaną, *dwerganą , *fehtaną, *felhaną, *fertaną, *flehtaną, *fregnaną, *geldaną, *gellaną, *gelpaną , *gerdaną, *gerraną, *gleppaną , *gnellaną , *gnestaną , *hellaną, *helpaną, *hneskwaną , *hrespaną, *hwekkaną , *hwelbaną, *hwerbaną, *kerbaną, **kersaną (*kerzaną), *kwellaną, *kwerraną, *leskaną, *melkaną, *meltaną, *serþaną, *skelbaną, *skeldaną, *skellaną, *skerbaną - *skerfaną, *skerpaną, *skersaną, *skertaną, *skrellaną, *smellaną, *smeltaną, *smertaną, *snerhaną, *snerkaną, *snerpaną, *snertaną, *sterbaną, *stregdaną, *swelganą, *swellaną, *sweltaną, *swerbaną, *swerkaną, *teldaną, *þehsaną, *þersaną, *þreskaną, *þwersaną, *weltaną, *welwaną, *werganą, *werkaną, *werpaną, *wersaną, *werþaną, *werzaną - *werraną, *wreskwaną;

Aorist-present roots: *murnaną, *spurnaną;

- Class 4 with 26 roots: *beraną, *brekaną, *bremaną, *dwelaną, *felaną, *helaną, *hlemaną, *klenaną, *kwelaną, *kweraną, *nemaną, *skeraną, *stelaną, *stenaną, *swelaną, *swemaną, *sweraną, *temaną, *teraną, *tremaną, *þweraną;

Aorist-present roots: knedaną – *knudaną, *kwemaną – *kumaną, *swefaną – *sufaną, *tredaną – *trudaną, *welaną – *wulaną.

- Class 5 with 50 roots: *dewaną, *drepaną, *esaną, *etaną, *fehaną, *fetaną, *frehnaną, *gebaną, *getaną, *hlefaną, *hreganą, *hreþaną, *hrewaną, *hwekaną, *jedaną, *jehaną, *jesaną, *kewaną, *kresaną, *kweþaną, *lekaną, *lesaną, *mekaną, *metaną, *nesaną, *neþaną, *plehaną, *rekaną, *rekwaną, *sehwaną, *skehaną, *skrekaną - skrekkaną, *skrepaną, *slekwaną, *sprekaną, *streþaną, *treganą, *trekaną - *trekkaną, *þrekaną, *þrewaną, *webaną, *wedaną, *weganą, *wesaną, *wrekaną;

j-present roots: *bidjaną, *frigjaną, *ligjaną, *sitjaną, *þigjaną;

- Class 6 with 41 roots: *akaną, *alaną, *ananą, *bakaną - *bakkaną, *dabaną, *drabaną, *draganą, *fahaną, *faraną, *flahaną, *galaną, *gnaganą, *grabaną, *hlaþaną, *hnabaną, *kalaną, *lahaną, *lapaną, *malaną, *sakaną, *skabaną, *skakaną, *slahaną, *snakaną, *spananą, *standaną, *takaną, *þwahaną, *wadaną, *wahwaną (*gawahwaną), *wakaną;

j-present roots: *fraþjaną, *habjaną - *hafjaną, *hlahjaną, *kwabjaną, *sabjaną - *safjaną, *skapjaną, *skaþjaną, *stapjaną, *swarjaną, *wahsijaną;

- Class 7

7a with 11 roots: *aihaną, *aikaną, *fraisaną, *haitaną, *laikaną, *maitaną, *skaiþaną - *skaidaną, *spaitaną, *swaipaną, *taisaną, *þlaihaną;
7b with 14 roots: *audaną, *aukaną, *ausaną, *bautaną, *brautaną, *dauganą, *dawjaną, *haufaną, *hawwaną, *hlaupaną, *klawjaną, *naupaną, *skraudaną, *stautaną;
7c with 23 roots: *arjaną, *bannaną, *blandaną, *falganą, *fallaną, *faltaną, *falþaną - *faldaną, *fanhaną, *ganganą, *haldaną, *hanhaną, *pranganą, *saltaną, *skaldaną, *spaldaną, *spannaną, *staldaną, *stanganą, *waldaną, *walkaną, *wallaną, *waltaną, *waskaną;
7d with 27 roots: *bēaną, *bēganą, *blēaną, *blēsaną, *brēaną, *brēdaną, *dēaną, *drēdaną, *fēaną, *gēaną, *grētaną, *hwēsaną, *hwētaną,, *knēaną, *krēaną, *lējaną, *lētaną, *mēaną, *nēaną, *rēdaną, *sēaną, *slēpaną, *stēaną, *swēþaną, *tēkaną, *þrēaną, *wēaną;
7e with 24 roots: *bōaną, *bōwwaną, *blōaną, *blōtaną, *bnōwwaną, *brōaną, *brōkaną, *flōaną, *flōkaną, *glōaną, *grōaną, *hlōaną, *hnōaną, *hrōpaną, *hwōpaną, *hwōsaną, *knōdaną, *rōaną, *snōwaną, *spōaną, *swōganą, *þrōwaną, *wōpijaną, *wrōtaną;

== Gothic ==
Being the oldest Germanic language with any significant literature, it is not surprising that Gothic preserves the strong verbs best. However, some changes still occurred:

- e > i, eliminating the distinction between the two vowels, except in the reduplicated syllable where e (spelled ai) was retained in all cases.
- i > e (spelled ai) and u > o (spelled au) when followed by r, h or ƕ.
- Consonant alternations are almost eliminated by generalising the voiceless alternant across all forms.

Also, long ī was spelled ei in Gothic.

Class	Part 1	Part 2	Part 3	Part 4	Verb meaning
1	dreiban	draif	dribun	dribans	to drive
2a	liugan	laug	lugun	lugans	to lie (tell untruth)
2b	lūkan	lauk	lukun	lukans	to close, to shut
3a	bindan	band	bundun	bundans	to bind
3b	hilpan wairþan	halp warþ	hulpun waurþun	hulpans waurþans	to help to become
4	qiman bairan	qam bar	qēmun bērun	qumans baurans	to come to bear
5	lisan saiƕan	las saƕ	lēsun sēƕun	lisans saiƕans	to gather to see
6	alan	ōl	ōlun	alans	to grow, to mature
7a	haitan	haihait	haihaitun	haitans	to call
7b	hlaupan	haihlaup	haihlaupun	hlaupans	to leap
7c	haldan fāhan	haihald faifāh	haihaldun faifāhun	haldans fāhans	to hold to catch
7d	lētan saian	lailōt saisō	lailōtun saisōun	lētans saians	to allow to sow
7e	ƕōpjan	ƕaiƕōp	ƕaiƕōpun	ƕōpans	to boast

- Note: The sounds kw and hw are transcribed in Gothic as q and ƕ respectively.

== West Germanic ==
Changes that occurred in the West Germanic languages:

- ē > ā
- a-mutation: u > o when a follows in the next syllable. This affected the past participles of classes 2–4. However, an intervening m or n + consonant blocked this, so the past participle of class 3a kept u.
- Extension of umlaut to back vowels, causing it to apply also to verbs of class 6.
- The perfective prefix ga- came to be used (but neither exclusively nor invariably) as a marker of the participle. In English this prefix disappeared again in the Middle Ages.

=== English ===
==== Old English ====
The following changes occurred from West Germanic to Old English:

- ai > ā
- eu > ēo
- au > ēa
- a > æ except when a back vowel followed in the next syllable
- ā > ǣ
- Breaking before certain consonants: æ > ea and e > eo
- West Saxon Palatalisation: i > ie after g

The following are the paradigms for Old English:

Class	Part 1	Part 2	Part 3	Part 4	Verb meaning
1	rīdan	rād	ridon	ġeriden	to ride
2a	frēosan	frēas	fruron	ġefroren	to freeze
2b	lūcan	lēac	lucon	ġelocen	to lock
3a	bindan	band	bundon	ġebunden	to bind
3b	weorþan	wearþ	wurdon	ġeworden	to become
4	beran	bær	bǣron	ġeboren	to bear
5	lesan	læs	lǣron	ġeleren	to gather
6	alan	ōl	ōlon	ġealen	to nourish, to grow
7a	hātan	hēt, heht	hēton, hehton	ġehāten	to call, to be called
7b	hlēapan	hlēop	hlēopon	ġehlēapen	to leap
7c	healdan	hēold	hēoldon	ġehealden	to hold
7d	rǣdan	rēd	rēdon	ġerǣden	to advise, to interpret
7e	blōtan	blēot	blēoton	ġeblōten	to sacrifice

With j-presents (and other anomalies):

- hebban hōf hōfon hafen ("to raise, heave")
- scieppan scōp scōpon scapen ("to create, shape")
- swerian swōr swōron sworen ("to swear")

The verb "to stand" follows class 6. The anomalous -n- in the present is a relic of the PIE nasal infix:

- standan stōd stōdon standen

Some relics of class 7 reduplication remain in Old English, mostly in texts from Anglia (infinitive and past singular shown):

- bēatan beoft ("to beat")
- hātan hēht ("to call")
- lācan leolc ("to move about, leap")
- lǣtan leort ("to let")
- on-drǣdan on-dreord ("to dread")
- rēdan reord ("to advise")
- spātan speoft ("to spit")

Changes that occurred from Old English to Modern English:

- ā > ō
- Great Vowel Shift
- The old second-person singular ("thou") form acquires the ending "-st" in the past, but the second-person singular falls out of common use and is replaced with the second-person plural.
- Elimination of almost all verb inflection in strong verbs, except for the third-person singular present ending -s (and the second-person ending "-(e)st", when used).
- Either the past singular form or the past plural form is generalised to the other number. As a result, only one form exists for all past tense forms and parts 2 and 3 are no longer distinguished.
- Combined with the above, all consonant alternations are eliminated by generalising the consonant of the present. Only be preserves the alternation: was versus were.

==== Modern English ====
In Modern English, generally speaking, the verb classes have disintegrated and are not easily recognisable.
For the principal parts of all English strong verbs see: Wiktionary appendix: Irregular English verbs.

The following modern English verbs resemble the original paradigm:

Class	Part 1	Parts 2 and 3	Part 4
1	ride bite	rode bit	ridden bitten
2	freeze	froze	frozen
3	swim win	swam won	swum won
4	break	broke	broken
5	give	gave	given
6	take	took	taken
7b	beat		beaten
7c	fall	fell	fallen
7d	throw	threw	thrown
7e	grow	grew	grown

Class 1

Class 1 is still recognisable, as in most other Germanic languages. The modern past is taken from either the old past singular (ride rode ridden) or the old past plural (bite bit bitten). In the case of shine shone shone, the past participle has also assimilated to the past singular.

Class 1 roots in modern English (excluding derived verbs such as abide and override) are bide, bite, chide, drive, hide, ride, rise, rive, shine, shit/shite, shrive, slide, smite, stride, strike, strive, thrive, write. Bide, chide, rive, shine, shrive, strive, thrive can also be weak. However, although most of these verbs have uniformity in their infinitive vowel, they no longer form a coherent class in further inflected forms – for example, bite (bit, bitten), ride (rode, ridden), shine (shone, shone), and strike (struck, struck/stricken, with struck and stricken used in different meanings) all show different patterns from one another – but bide, drive, ride, rise, smite, stride, strive, write do form a (more or less) coherent subclass. Most of these verbs are descended from Old English class 1 verbs. However:

- strive is a French loan-word which is class 1 by analogy to drive. (By coincidence it is ultimately descended from an Old Frankish class 1 verb.)
- thrive is a class 1 verb formed by analogy to drive, its Old English ancestor being weak and descended from Old Norse þrífa (itself a class 1 strong verb, meaning "to grasp").
- hide is a class 1 verb whose Old English ancestor, hȳdan, was weak.

In American English, the past tense of the verb dive is usually dove, as though it is in Class 1, but the past participle is still dived.

Class 2

Class 2 does not form a coherent class, as each verb has developed different irregularities. It includes choose, cleave, fly, freeze and shoot (whose usual passive participle is shot rather than shotten). The verb bid (in the sense of "to offer") was in Class 2, but now the past and past participle are bid. The obsolete verb forlese is now used only as the passive participle forlorn.

Class 3

Class 3 in English is still fairly large and regular. The past is formed either from the old past singular or from the past plural. Many of the verbs have two past forms, one of which may be dialectal or archaic (begin, drink, ring, shrink, sing, slink, spin, spring, stink, swing, swim and wring). The class 3a verbs in modern English are:

- normal past in a: begin, drink, ring, run, sing, swim, thring
- normal past in u or ou: bind, cling, find, fling, grind, sling, slink, spin, sting, string, swing, win, wind
- past can have either a or u: shrink, sink, stink, spring, wring (in colloquial language, bring can be analogically brought into this subclass)

English fling does not go back to Old English, and may be a loan-word from Norse. It seems to have adopted class 3 forms by analogy with cling etc. Similarly, ring and string were historically weak. The verb ding (in the meaning of to hit) was in this class as well, but is now usually treated as a weak verb.

Class 3b has shrunk to only four members:

- melt (the past tense is weak, but retains the strong participle ‘molten’ )
- swell (but the past tense is now often swelled instead of swole, and sometimes the passive participle as well)
- fight
- burst, its past tense and participle have both become the same as the present tense. This is also the case for its variant bust

Class 4

In Modern English, regular class 4 verbs have all kept the –n in the participle, though eliminating the medial e after r, this class exhibits near homogeneity of vowel pattern:

- break broke broken

but several verbs have archaic preterites that preserve the "a" of Middle English (bare, brake, gat, sware, tare, and spake or Scots spak). Class 4 verbs in English (not including derivatives such as beget) are bear, break, get, shear, speak, steal, swear, tear, tread, wake, weave; and without the -n and of irregular vowel progression: come. Get, speak, tread and weave (weave, and occasionally tread, can also be weak) were originally of class 5, whereas swear was originally class 6. Wake was also originally class 6, and in fact retains the "a" of the present tense – the preterite woke (Middle English wook) only conforms to the modern class 4 preterite, not to the historic class 4 preterite in "a". The verb come is anomalous in all the West Germanic languages because it originally began with qu-, and the subsequent loss of the w sound coloured the vowel of the present stem. modern English "come came come", compared to Old English cuman cymþ – cōm cōmon – cumen and Middle English comen – cam or com – comen.

Class 5

In Modern English this group has lost all group cohesion.

- eat ate eaten
- give gave given
- lie lay lain
- see saw seen
- sit sat sat (archaic sitten)

Class 5 verbs in Modern English: bid (in the sense of "to command" or "to invite"), eat, forbid, give, lie (= lie down), see, sit. The verb quethe is only used poetically now. Get, speak, tread, and weave, which come from Class 5 verbs, are now Class 4. The verb forbid comes from a Class 2 verb in Old English, as did bid in the sense of "to offer, proclaim", but forbid is conflated with the other verb bid ("to command"). The preterite can be forbad or forbade, or even forbid. The preterite ate is pronounced "et" in some British dialects; historically the form eat, homophonous with the present stem was also found for the preterite. Although the verb to be is suppletive and highly irregular, its past follows the pattern of a class 5 strong verb, with grammatischer Wechsel (the alternation of "s" and "r" in "was" versus "were"), and has uniquely retained the singular/plural distinction of both ablaut grade and consonant in the modern languages. Old English: wæs/wǣron, English: was/were. For full paradigms and historical explanations see Indo-European copula.

Class 6

Class 6 has disintegrated as well. The verbs shake, take and forsake come closest to the original vowel sequence. The consonant anomaly in stand is still visible, and is extended to the participle.

- shake shook shaken
- stand stood stood

Class 6 verbs in modern English: drag, draw, forsake, lade, shake, shape, shave, slay, stand, take. The verb heave is in this class when used in a nautical context. Like most other classes in Modern English, this class has lost cohesion and now forms principal parts according to many different patterns. Two preterites (drew and slew) are now spelled with "ew", which is similar in sound to the "oo" of the others that still use a strong form. Swear is now class 4. The adjective graven was originally a past participle of the now obsolete verb grave. Lade, shape, shave, wax are now weak outside of their optionally strong past participle forms (laden, shapen, shaven, and waxen respectively). Fare has archaic past tense fore and rare past participle faren, but is normally weak now.

Class 7

In Modern English, this class has lost its homogeneity:

- fall fell fallen
- hang hung hung (In the transitive sense of hanging someone by the neck, hang usually has regular weak conjugation hanged)
- hold held held (the original past participle is preserved in the adjective beholden)
- throw threw thrown

The following modern English verbs descend from class 7 verbs, and still retain strong-verb endings: beat, blow, fall, hew, grow, hang, hold, know, throw. (Hew can be a preterite or present, although the usual preterite, and sometimes the participle too, is hewed.) The verb let can be considered Class 7, though the past participle now lacks the ending -en. The verbs mow and sow sometimes retain the strong-verb participles mown and sown but the preterites are now usually mowed and sowed. (The verb sew was always weak, even though one can say sewn for the past participle.) The verb show, originally a weak verb, has acquired a strong past participle shown, and in some dialects even a class 7 strong past tense shew (This "shew" is not to be confused with present "shew", which is an older spelling of, and pronounced the same as, "show"). Archaic English still retained the reduplicated form hight ("called", originally a past tense, usually with a passive meaning, but later also used as a passive participle). The verb crow was also in class 7, as in the King James Version "while he yet spake, the cock crew".

=== Dutch ===
Old Dutch is attested only fragmentarily, so it is not easy to give forms for all classes. Hence, Middle Dutch is shown here in that role instead. The situation of Old Dutch generally resembled that of Old Saxon and Old High German in any case.

Changes from West Germanic to Old Dutch:

- ai > ē (but sometimes ei is preserved)
- au > ō
- eu > iu
- ē > ie
- ō > uo (later becomes /uə/, spelled <oe> in Middle Dutch)

From Old Dutch to Middle Dutch:

- u > o
- ū > ȳ (spelled <uu>)
- iu > ȳ (northern dialects)
- iu > io > ie (southern dialects)
- Lengthening of vowels in open syllables: e > ē, o > ō, a > ā, although it continues to be written with a single vowel. i is lengthened to ē, and short y (from umlaut of u) to eu /øː/.
- Unlike most other languages, umlaut does not affect long vowels or diphthongs except in the eastern dialects.
- Because of the combined effect of the two above points, umlaut is eliminated as a factor in verb conjugation.

From Middle Dutch to Modern Dutch:

- Diphthongisation of long high vowels: /iː/ > /ɛi/, /yː/ > /œy/ (spelled <ij> and <ui>)
- Monophthongisation of opening diphthongs: /iə/ > /i/, /uə/ > /u/ (still spelled <ie> and <oe>)

Class	Part 1	Part 2	Part 3	Part 4	Verb meaning
1	rijden	reed	reden	gereden	to drive, to ride
2a	vriezen	vroor	vroren	gevroren	to freeze
2b	sluiten	sloot	sloten	gesloten	to close
3a	binden	bond	bonden	gebonden	to bind, to tie
3b	bergen	borg	borgen	geborgen	to protect, to store away
3 + 7	sterven	stierf	stierven	gestorven	to die
4	stelen	stal	stalen	gestolen	to steal
4 Irregular	scheren	schoor	schoren	geschoren	to cut, shave
5	geven	gaf	gaven	gegeven	to give
5 Irregular	zitten	zat	zaten	gezeten	to sit
6	graven	groef	groeven	gegraven	to dig
7b	lopen	liep	liepen	gelopen	to walk, to run
7c	vallen	viel	vielen	gevallen	to fall
7c Irregular	hangen	hing	hingen	gehangen	to hang
7d	slapen	sliep	sliepen	geslapen	to sleep
7e	roepen	riep	riepen	geroepen	to call

Class 1

This class is well preserved and has the most strong verbs. Not only has it preserved many strong verbs inherited from the proto language, it was also able to expand by introducing the strong inflection to a large number of weak verbs by analogy. Sound changes caused the historical ‘ai’ and ‘i’ in open syllables, to merge as a long ‘e’ essentially merging parts 2,3,4.

Regular class 1 pattern (ɛi-e:-e:-e:):

- Inherited strong roots: bezwijken, bijten, blijken, blijven, drijven, glijden, grijpen, kijken, kijven, knijpen, krijgen, krijsen (can also be a weak verb), krijten ("to cry"), lijden, mijden, nijgen, nijpen, rijden, rijgen, rijten, rijven, rijzen, schijnen, schijten, schrijden, schrijven, slijpen, slijten, smijten, snijden, splijten, stijgen, strijden, strijken, tijgen, verdwijnen, wijken, wijten, wrijven, zijgen.
- Historically weak: belijden (influenced by lijden), hijsen, kwijten, lijken, prijzen, spijten, stijven, vijzen (Flemish), vrijen (also weak), wijzen, zwijgen.
- Two verbs with 'ei' have also joined this class by analogy, as 'ij' and 'ei' are pronounced the same: uitscheiden, zeiken.
- Non-standard, archaic or dialectal strong verbs: beklijven (strong verb forms are archaic), benijden (strong forms are common but non-standard), breien (strong forms are common but non-standard), drijten (a dialectal strong verb), hijgen (strong forms are common but non-standard), mijgen / miegen (a dialectal strong verb), pijpen (archaic strong verb, in the sense of playing a windinstrument), grijnen (an archaic strong verb), wrijten (archaic/dialectal strong verb), zijpen (dialectal strong verb), gedijen (the past tense gedee(g) is dialectal, the strong past participle gedegen has the meaning thorough whereas the weak past participle gedijd means thriven, which corresponds to the regular meaning of the verb).

Class 2

A notable development in Dutch is the growth of class 2b at the expense of class 2a. Like class 1, sound changes caused the historical ‘au’ and ‘u’ in open syllables, to merge as a long ‘o’ merging parts 2,3,4.

Regular class 2a roots (i-o:-o:-o:):

- Inherited strong roots: bedriegen, bieden, genieten, gieten, kiezen, klieven, liegen, rieken, schieten, vliegen, zieden ("to seethe", weak in the sense "to be agitated").

- Restricted to literary or poetic use: verdrieten, vlieden, vlieten.

Regular class 2b roots (œy-o:-o:-o:):

- Inherited strong roots: buigen, duiken, druipen, kruipen, ontluiken, ruiken, schuiven, sluipen, sluiten, snuiven, spruiten, stuiven, zuigen, zuipen.
- Historically weak: fluiten, kluiven, pluizen, schuilen, snuiten, spuiten.
- Non-standard, archaic or dialectal strong verbs: fuiven (strong forms are used in colloquial Flemish), gluipen (a weak verb, strong forms are archaic), kruien (weak verb, strong forms are archaic), ontpluiken (an archaic strong verb), ruilen (strong forms are used in southern dialects), sluiken (an archaic strong verb), stuipen (an archaic strong verb), wuiven (strong forms are common but non-standard).

Anomalous class 2 roots:

- The verbs verliezen and vriezen preserved the grammatischer Wechsel: verliezen-verloor-verloren, vriezen-vroor-gevroren. Although the root kiezen has lost the alternation, the derived verb (uit)verkiezen still displays it in poetic or archaic contexts: verkiezen-verkoor-verkoren.
- The verb tijgen has a class 2 past tense and participle when it means 'to pull'.
- The verb spugen can also be declined with a class 2 past tense and participle.

Class 3

Class 3a and 3b have generalised part 3 to part 2, eliminating the -a- from this class. Some 3b verbs have a past in -ie- like class 7: helpen – hielp – geholpen. This can be considered a new "class 3 + 7".

Regular class 3a roots (ɪ-ɔ-ɔ-ɔ):

- Inherited strong roots: binden, blinken, dringen, drinken, dwingen, -ginnen (beginnen – ontginnen), glimmen, klimmen, klinken, krimpen, schrinken (archaic), slinken, spinnen, springen, stinken, verslinden, verzwinden (literary/poetic), vinden, winden, winnen, wringen, zingen, zinken, zinnen.
- Historically weak: dingen, schrikken.

Regular class 3b roots (ɛ-ɔ-ɔ-ɔ):

- Inherited strong roots: bergen, delven, gelden, kerven, melken, schelden, smelten, vechten, vlechten, zwelgen, zwellen, zwelten (archaic).
- Three verbs of another class have joined with 3b: treffen, trekken (both class 5), zwemmen (class 3a).
- Historically weak: schenden, schenken, zenden; These verbs became strong by reinterpreting the Rückumlaut that was present in some Old and Middle Dutch weak verbs as a strong vowel alternation.

Class 3 + 7 roots (ɛ-i-i-ɔ):

- Inherited strong verbs: -derven (bederven – verderven), helpen, sterven, werpen, werven, zwerven.

Anomalous class 3 roots:

- The verb worden (to become) also belonged to class 3b, but the past and present vowels appear to have been swapped: worden werd geworden.
- Semi-strong with a weak past tense and a strong participle: barsten, the verb changed the older vowels 'e' and 'o' into 'a': barsten – barstte – gebarsten

Class 4

Class 4 and 5 verbs still show the distinction in vowel between the past singular (part 2) and plural (part 3), although this is not obvious due to the rules of Dutch orthography: ik nam ("I took") has the plural wij namen (not *nammen), that is, the 'short' vowel [ɑ] of the singular is replaced by the 'long' [aː] in the plural. (Note the relationship of consonant doubling to vowel length, which is explained at Dutch orthography). The pattern is therefore: breken brak (braken) gebroken ("to break")

Regular class 4 roots (eː-ɑ-a:-oː): bevelen, breken, nemen, spreken, steken, stelen.

Class 4 roots with 'o(o)' in the preterite (eː-o:-o:-oː): scheren, wegen and zweren ("to hurt, to sore").

Anomalous roots:

- The present tense vowel of the verb komen was influenced by a preceding w, which was subsequently lost. The etymological w is retained in the past, unlike English or German: komen – kwam – kwamen – gekomen.
- Semi-strong with a weak past tense and a strong participle: verhelen (helen is a weak verb however), wreken.

Class 5

Regular class 5 roots (eː-ɑ-a:-eː): eten, genezen, geven, lezen, meten, treden, vergeten, vreten

Class 5 j-present roots (ɪ--ɑ-a:-eː): bidden, liggen, zitten. These have a short 'i' in part 1 because of the gemination of the consonants, they retain the long 'e' vowel in part 4.

Anomalous roots:

- The root zien ("to see") has experienced a loss of the original /h/, with a resulting assimilation of the stem vowel to the vowel of the inflection, and shows Grammatischer Wechsel between this original /h/ and a /g/ in the past: zien – zag – zagen – gezien.
- The preterite of wezen / zijn ("to be") still shows both (quantitative) ablaut and grammatischer Wechsel between the singular and plural: was/waren.
- Semi-strong with a weak past tense and a strong participle: weven.

Class 6

Class 6 has become very small, many of its verbs have gone weak or have become semi-strong.

Regular class 6 roots (a-u-u-a): dragen, graven, varen.

Anomalous roots:

- The verb slaan (to hit) like the verb zien has experienced a loss of the original /h/, with a resulting assimilation of the stem vowel to the vowel of the inflection, and shows Grammatischer Wechsel between this original /h/ and a /g/ in the past: slaan – sloeg – sloegen – geslagen.
- The suppleted past tense of the verb staan ("to stand") also belonged to this class, it now declines with a short 'o': staan – stond – stonden – gestaan.
- The three inherited j-presents, heffen, scheppen, and , zweren ("to swear an oath") historically decline with 'e'-'oe'-'oe'-'a(a)'. In the modern language they decline irregularly, two have taken 'ie' in the past tense, all three have taken separate vowels in the participle: scheppen – schiep – geschapen ("to create"), heffen – hief – geheven ("to lift, raise"), zweren – zwoer – gezworen ("to swear an oath"),.
- Semi-strong roots with a strong past tense and a weak participle: jagen, klagen (Flemish, colloquially), vragen, waaien.
- Semi-strong roots with a weak past tense and a strong participle: lachen, laden, malen, varen ("to fare" The sense "to travel by boat" has a class 6 past voer)

Class 7

Class 7 has shrunk in the modern language, like class 6 many of its verbs have become semi-strong. This class has an -ie- in the past tense, the past participle has the same vowel as the present tense. (The verbs with * are nowadays mostly semi-strong)

- Class 7a has disappeared. The verbs heten ("to call") and scheiden ("to separate") have become semi-strong.
- Class 7b: lopen, stoten*.
- Class 7c: gaan, houden, houwen, vallen, hangen, vangen, wassen* (The meaning to "to grow" is always strong but is archaic, the meaning "to wash" is mostly semi-strong).

- One verb displays L-vocalization: houden – hield – gehouden ("to hold")
- As in German, two anomalous class 7c verbs have formed new present stems, and shortened the vowel in the past tense: vangen – ving – gevangen ("to catch") and hangen – hing – gehangen ("to hang"). The suppleted past tense of the verb gaan ("to go") also belongs to this class and is declined: gaan – ging – gegaan.

- Class 7d: blazen, slapen, laten, raden*.
- Class 7e: roepen.
- Semi-strong roots with a weak past tense and a strong participle: bakken, bannen, braden, brouwen, heten, raden, scheiden (uitscheiden is a class 1 verb however), spannen, spouwen, (in the meaning 'to split'), stoten, vouwen (the past had -ield-, like houden), wassen, zouten (the past had -ielt-, like houden).

Other

A special case is hoeven, which is a weak verb that can decline with a strong participle in some circumstances, even though the verb was never strong to begin with.

==== Afrikaans ====
The distinction between simple past, present and past perfect has been lost in Afrikaans, as the original past tense has fallen out of use almost entirely, being replaced with the old present perfect tense using (usually) a strong past participle. For example, the ancestral Dutch hij zong has become hy het gesing ("he sang/has sung/had sung"). Modal verbs tend to retain their strong past tense, and a handful of other verbs do so too. Verbs almost never retain both a strong past tense and a strong past participle, due to the loss of the grammatical distinction. The exception is wees ("to be"), which does retain both was and gewees. Nonetheless, there are many verbs for which the new past tense is formed with a strong past participle, such as geboë from buig ("bend") or gedrewe from dryf ("drive" to set into motion).

The notion exists that strong past participles always have a figurative meaning, and weak and strong past participles sometimes coexist within the language. Sometimes, this seems to be the case. For instance, compare strong and figurative bedorwe jeug ("spoiled youth") to weak and literal bederfde yoghurt ("spoiled yoghurt"), or strong and figurative gebroke hart ("broken heart") to weak and literal gebreekte vaas ("broken vase"). Nonetheless, this notion is not 100% accurate. Sometimes the strong past participle just happens to be more common. For instance, the strong participles are used in bevrore groente ("frozen vegetables") and aangenome kinders ("adopted children").

=== German ===
From West Germanic to Old High German:

- High German consonant shift
- ē > ia
- ai > ei, then ei > ē before r, h and w
- au > ou, then ou > ō before dentals (þ, d, t, n, l, s, z, r) and h.
- e > i before u

Class	Part 1	Part 2	Part 3	Part 4	Verb meaning
1	rītan	reit	ritun	giritan	to ride
2a	friosan	frōs	frurun	gifroran	to freeze
2b	sūfan	souf	suffun	gisoffan	to drink, to slurp
3a	bintan	bant	buntun	buntan	to bind
3b	werdan	ward	wurtun	giwortan	to become
4	beran	bar	bārun	giboran	to bear
5	lesan	las	lārun	gileran	to gather, to read
6	tragan	truog	truogun	gitragan	to carry
7a	heizan	hiaz	hiazun	giheizan	to call, to be called
7b	(h)loufan	(h)liof	(h)liofun	gi(h)loufan	to run
7c	haltan	hialt	hialtun	gihaltan	to hold
7d	rātan	riat	riatun	girātan	to advise
7e	wuofan	wiof	wiofun	giwuofan	to weep

- Class 1 has two subclasses, depending on the vowel in the past singular:
  - 1a rītan rītu reit ritum giritan ("to ride")
  - 1b līhan līhu lēh ligum giligan ("to loan" – note grammatischer Wechsel.)
- Class 2b verbs are rare, unlike in the more northern languages.
- A few relics of reduplication remain:
  - ana-stōzan ana-sterōz ("to strike")
  - pluozan pleruzzun ("to sacrifice"), in Upper German with the change b > p
  - ki-scrōtan ki-screrōt ("to cut"), in Upper German with the change g > k
  - būan biruun ("to dwell"); this was not a class 7 strong verb originally

Changes from Old High German to Modern German:

- io, ia, ie > ī (spelled <ie>)
- ei, ī > ai (retaining the spelling <ei>)
- ou, ū > au
- ȳ > ɔy (spelled <eu> or <äu>)
- i > ī (spelled <ie>) before a single consonant.
- Alternations between past singular and plural are eliminated by generalising part 3 or part 2. If part 3 is generalised in verbs with alternations of the s-r type, it is not just generalised to the past singular but also to the present.

Class	Part 1	Part 2	Part 3	Part 4	Verb meaning
1	reiten leihen	ritt lieh	ritten liehen	geritten geliehen	to ride to lend
2a	bieten	bot	boten	geboten	to offer, to bid
2b	saugen	sog	sogen	gesogen	to suck
3a	binden rinnen glimmen	band rann glomm	banden rannen glommen	gebunden geronnen geglommen	to bind to flow to shine, to glow
3b	helfen dreschen	half drosch	halfen droschen	geholfen gedroschen	to help to thresh
4	treffen	traf	trafen	getroffen	to hit
5	geben	gab	gaben	gegeben	to give
6	graben	grub	gruben	gegraben	to dig
7a	heißen	hieß	hießen	geheißen	to be called
7b	laufen	lief	liefen	gelaufen	to walk/run
7c	halten	hielt	hielten	gehalten	to hold
7d	schlafen	schlief	schliefen	geschlafen	to sleep
7e	stoßen	stieß	stießen	gestoßen	to push, to knock

The classes are still well preserved in modern German.

Class 1

In class 1, part 3 is generalised, eliminating the older -ei- or -e-. However, a new subdivision arises because the i of the past tense forms is lengthened to ie before a single consonant. reiten ritt geritten ("to ride") versus leihen lieh geliehen ("to loan"). Class 1 verbs in modern German are:

- Class 1 with a long vowel in the preterite and participle (aɪ̯-i:-i:) : bleiben, gedeihen, leihen, meiden, reiben, scheiden, scheinen, schreiben, schreien, speiben / speien, steigen, treiben, zeihen

- Historically weak roots: beigen (Swiss german), preisen, schweigen, speisen (Swiss german)

- Class 1 with a short vowel in the preterite and participle (aɪ̯-ɪ-ɪ) : beißen, befleißen (archaic), bleichen, gleißen (dialectal), gleiten, greifen, keifen, kneifen, reißen, reiten, scheißen, schleichen, schleifen, schleißen, schmeißen, schreiten, spleißen (archaic), streichen, streiten, weichen.

- Historically weak roots: gleichen, pfeifen, weisen

- Anomalous class 1 roots: The verbs leiden and schneiden preserved the verner alternation: "leiden – litt – gelitten, schneiden – schnitt – geschnitten".

Class 2

In class 2, part 2 is generalised, eliminating older -u-. Class 2b verbs are rare, as in Old High German.

- Class 2a with a long vowel in the preterite and participle (i:-o:-o:) : biegen, bieten, fliegen, fliehen, frieren, klieben, schieben, stieben, verlieren, wiegen, ziehen.
- Class 2a with a short vowel in the preterite and participle (i:-ɔ-ɔ) : fließen, genießen, gießen, kriechen, riechen, schießen, schliefen, schließen, sieden, sprießen, triefen.

Anomalous class 2a roots:

- The roots sieden and ziehen have preserved the verner alternation: "sieden – sott – gesotten" and "ziehen – zog – gezogen"
- The roots lügen ("to tell a lie") and trügen ("to deceive"), have changed their present tense vowels from 'ie' to 'ü'. This no doubt arises from a desire to disambiguate Middle High German liegen from ligen (class 5), which would have sounded the same after vowel lengthening. Trügen would have followed in its wake, because the two words form a common rhyming collocation.
- The verb kiesen has become obsolete, however the strong past tense and past participle are still used. Some speakers reinterpreted these forms as if they are part of the related verb küren, creating the pattern: küren-kor-gekoren.

In German class 2b was never large, the modern language retains the following verbs: krauchen, saufen, saugen, schnauben.

Class 3

In class 3, part 2 is generalised. The o of the 3b participle has been passed by analogy to some 3a verbs, and also to the past of some verbs of both groups: beginnen begann begonnen, bergen barg geborgen ("to rescue"), quellen quoll gequollen ("to well up"). Thus, there are now 5 subgroups:

Class 3a

- regular (ɪ-a-ʊ) : binden, dingen (by analogy), dringen, finden, gelingen, klingen, ringen, schlingen, schwinden, schwingen, singen, sinken, springen, stinken, trinken, winden, winken (by analogy), wringen, zwingen.
- with substitution of o in the participle (ɪ-a-ɔ) : beginnen, gewinnen, rinnen, schwimmen, sinnen, spinnen.
- with substitution of o in the preterite and participle (ɪ-ɔ-ɔ) : glimmen, klimmen.

Class 3b

- regular (ɛ-a-ɔ) : bergen, bersten, gelten, helfen, schelten, sterben, verderben, werben, werfen.
- with substitution of o in preterite (ɛ-ɔ-ɔ) : dreschen, fechten, flechten, melken, quellen, schmelzen, schwellen, zerschellen.

Anomalous class 3 roots:

- The root werden generalizes part 3 instead of part 2 (ɛ-ʊ-ɔ), and also suffixes -e; werden, wurde, geworden. The original (part 2) singular preterite ward is still recognizable to Germans, but is archaic.
- The root löschen replaced the vowel of the infintive with 'ö' (œ-ɔ-ɔ).
- The root schallen can be declined with a strong past tense in 'o'.
- The root schinden which was originally weak, acquired an anomalous strong inflection with 'u' (ɪ-ʊ-ʊ).

Class 4

In class 4, the long -a- of part 3 was generalised to part 2. Example: nehmen nahm genommen ("to take").

- Class 4 with long vowels in the present tense (eː-a:-o:) : befehlen, gebären, stehlen.
- Class 4 with long vowels and substitution with o in preterite (eː-o:-o:) : gären, scheren, schwären, wägen, weben, bewegen.
- Class 4 with a long vowel in the present tense and short in the participle (eː-a:-ɔ) : nehmen.
- Class 4 with short vowels in the present tense and participle (ɛ-a:-ɔ) : brechen, schrecken, sprechen, stechen, treffen.

Several of these verbs have been moved into this class from other classes. sprechen and treffen were originally class 5, befehlen was originally class 3, and stechen was originally class 1 (having had a change in the present vowel). schrecken was originally a weak verb and remains weak in transitive use.

Anomalous:
- kommen ("to come") still has the anomalous o in the present stem (although some dialects have regularised it to kemmen): kommen kam gekommen

Class 5

Class 5 is little changed from Old High German, like class 4 the long -a- of part 3 was generalised.

- Class 5 with long vowels in the present tense and participle (e:-a:-e:) : geben, genesen, geschehen, lesen, sehen, treten.
- Class 5 with short vowels in the present tense and participle (ɛ-a:-ɛ) : essen, fressen, messen, vergessen.

- The verb essen ("to eat") had a past participle giezzan in OHG; in MHG this became geezzen which was contracted to gezzen and then re-prefixed to gegezzen.
- j-presents: bitten, liegen, sitzen.

Anomalous:
- The preterite of sein ("to be") is Old High German: was/wârun, but levelled in modern German: war/waren.

Class 6

Class 6 is also preserved. In Modern German the uo is monophthongised to u.

- Class 6 with long vowels in present tense and participle (a:-u:-a:) : fahren, graben, laden, schlagen, tragen.
- Class 6 with short vowels in present tense and participle (a-u:-a) : backen, schaffen, wachsen, waschen. backen is usually weak nowadays.

Anomalous class 6 roots:

- The j-presents heben, schwören have taken an o in the preterite and participle, perhaps by analogy with class 2: heben hob gehoben. The verb schwören has changed e to ö.
- The past tense and participle of stehen (stand, older stund, gestanden), which derive from a lost verb *standen, also belong to this class.
- With a strong participle only: mahlen
- The root fragen acquired a rarely used strong inflection beside the historically weak forms.

Class 7

In class 7, the various past tense vowels have merged into a single uniform -ie-.

- Class 7a: only heißen, as scheiden has become a class 1 strong verb.
- Class 7b: hauen, laufen, stoßen
- Class 7c: fallen, halten

- fangen, hängen have back-formed new present stems from the past stem, and have eliminated grammatischer Wechsel and shortened the vowel in the past tense: fangen fing gefangen ("to catch"), hängen hing gehangen ("to hang").
- The past tense and participle of German gehen, ging gegangen, derive from a lost verb *gangen which belongs to this class. (The verb still exists in other languages, such as the verb gang used in Scotland and northern England.)
- With a strong participle only: falten, salzen, spalten

- Class 7d: blasen, braten, lassen, raten, schlafen
- Class 7e: rufen

=== Low German ===
The following changes occurred from West Germanic to Old Saxon:

- ai > ē
- au > ō
- eu > io

Class	Part 1	Part 2	Part 3	Part 4	Verb meaning
1	rīdan	rēd	ridun	giridan	to ride
2a	friosan	frōs	frurun	gifroran	to freeze
2b	bilūkan	bilōk	bilukun	bilokan	to close
3a	bindan	band	bundun	gibundan	to bind
3b	werðan	warð	wurdun	giwordan	to become
4	beran	bar	bārun	giboran	to bear
5	lesan	las	lāsun	gilesan	to gather, to read
6	dragan	drōg	drōgun	gidragan	to carry
7a	hētan	hēt	hētun	gihētan	to call, to be called
7b	hlōpan	hliop	hliopun	gihlōpan	to run
7c	haldan	hēld	hēldun	gihaldan	to hold
7d	rādan	rēd	rēdun	girādan	to advise
7e	hrōpan	hriop	hriopun	gihrōpan	to call

From Old Saxon to Middle Low German:

- u > o
- io > e

As in Middle Dutch Lengthening of vowels in open syllables: e > ē, o > ō, a > ā, ö > ȫ, ü > ǖ. i Is often lengthened to ē.

There is no single Modern Low German, and some sources gives different forms than this. E.g. see

- Alfred v. d. Velde: Zu Fritz Reuter! Praktische Anleitung zum Verständniß des Plattdeutschen an der Hand des ersten Kapitels des Fritz Reuter'schen Romanes: "Ut mine Stromtid". Zweite Auflage. Leipzig, 1881, p. 60–63
- Julius Wiggers: Grammatik der plattdeutschen Sprache. In Grundlage der Mecklenburgisch-Vorpommerschen Mundart. Zweite Auflage. Hamburg, 1858, p. 57 ff.

Some differences:

- They have böd, böden instead of bood, boden, föll, föllen instead of full, fullen, stürw, stürwen, storwen instead of storv, storven, storven.
- They have spreken with sprök (thus not "4 regular (e-o-a)")

From Middle Low German to Modern Low German:

- ā > ē
- ō > ā except before r
- a > o in preterite forms
- e > a/ö when followed by two different consonants

Class	Part 1	Part 2	Part 3	Part 4	Verb meaning
1	rieden	reed	reden	reden	to ride
2a	beden	bood	boden	baden	to offer, to bid
2b	schuven	schoov	schoven	schaven	to shove
3a	binnen	bunn	bunnen	bunnen	to bind
3b	starven swellen	storv swull	storven swullen	storven swullen	to die to swell
4	stehlen steken	stohl steek/stook	stohlen steken/stoken	stahlen steken/staken	to steal
5	geven treden	geev tradd/treed	geven traden/treden	geven treden	to give to tread
6	graven	groov	groven	graven	to dig
7a	heten	heet	heten	heten	to be called
7b	lopen	leep	lepen	lopen	to walk/run
7c	holen fallen	heel full	helen fullen	holen fallen	to hold to fall
7d	slapen	sleep	slepen	slapen	to sleep
7e	ropen	reep	repen	ropen	to call

Most classes are quite well preserved, although the cohesion of some has been lost substantially or even entirely.

- Class 1 verbs in Low German are bieten, blieven, blieken, diegen/diehen, drieven, glieden, griepen, kieken, lieden, lieken, mieden, rieten, schienen, schieten, schrieden, schrien/schriegen, schrieven, slieken, sliepen, slieten, smieten, snieden, splieten, stiegen, strieden, strieken, swiegen, verdwienen, wieken, wiesen, wrieven and the originally weak verbs glieken, kniepen, priesen by analogy. Some other verbs take either strong or weak past endings: piepen, riesen and spieten.
- In class 2, part 2 is generalised, eliminating older -u-. Unlike in German but as in Dutch and English, class 2b has grown by moving older class 2a verbs into it. They are beden, bedregen, kesen, legen, flegen, fleten, freren/fresen, geneten, geten, krepen, reken, scheten, spreten, tehn, verleren/verlesen; with ū-present: bugen, krupen, schuven, snuven, sluten, supen, sugen, stuven. The verbs rüken and stöven show anomalous infinitive forms. Some verbs can take either strong or weak past endings: duken and schulen.
- In class 3, the form of the past participle seems to have been generalised to preterite forms. There are now 5 subgroups + two olders subgroups reduced to one verb each:
  - 3a regular (i-u-u): binnen, dringen, drinken, dwingen, finnen, gelingen, klingen, ringen, slingen, swinnen, swingen, singen, sinken, springen, stinken, wringen. Verbs that may take either strong or weak past endings: blinken, glimmen and klimmen.
  - 3a with ü-infinitive (ü-u-u): begünnen, swümmen
  - 3b regular (a-o-o): bargen, basten/barsten, starven, verdarven, warpen, warrn, warven
  - 3b with ö-infinitive (ö-o-o): hölpen, smölten
  - 3b with e-infinitive and -u- past forms because of phonetical influence of -ll- (e-u-u): gellen, schellen, swellen
  - 3b with e-infinitive (e-o-o): fechten
  - 3b with e-infinitive and different preterite and past participle forms (e-o-a) due to analogy with class 4 verbs: befehlen.
- In class 4, parts 2 and 3 seem to have merged into -ē-, but due to the influence of past participle forms mostly with a -ō- sound (nowadays written -ā-) a new ending -ō- has arisen:
  - 4 regular (e-o-a): breken, schrecken (with vowel lengthening: schrook, schraken), spreken, stehlen.
  - 4 with two possible preterite forms (e-o/e-a): nehmen, steken
  - 4 with a-infinitive (a-o-a): drapen

The verb kamen still shows the -u- infinitive which became -a-: kamen, keem, kamen. The verb to be, wesen, levelled its old preterite forms was/weren into weer/weren, although was still appears in some dialects.

- In class 5 too the -ē- forms of past participle seem to have influenced the preterite forms. Class 5 regular verbs (ē-ē-ē) include: eten, geven, schehn (preterite scheh or scheeg), lesen (nowadays mostly a weak verb), meten, sehn (preterite seeg) and vergeten. Verbs with j-presents: bidden (sometimes confused with beden), liggen, sitten.

The verb treden is anomalous as it has kept the -a- infinitive forms in the preterite and with the variation in vowel length, thus it has tradd, traddst, tradd in the singular with [a] but traden in the plural with [ɒː]. However, normal class 5 preterite forms treed, treedst, treed, treden may also be found.

- Class 6 is preserved as well however it has lost its cohesion. Regular class 6 verbs (ā-ō-ā) are graven and slaan (with anomalous infinitive and past participle slaan from earlier slagen). The 3 inherited j-presents have chosen different paths to make their past forms: heven is now similar to a class 5 verb and has heev in the preterite and heven in the past participle, schapen is a weak verb with strong past participle schapen and swören kept its preterite swoor as well as its past participle sworen – even though it may found with weak past forms.

The verb fohren is now merging with föhren and takes weak past endings. The verb dregen has an anomalous infinitive in -ē- but has kept its class 6 past forms droog, drogen (preterite) and dragen (past participle). The verb laden has gone weak but has laden beside laadt in the past participle. The past tense of stahn (stunn), which derives from Middle Low German standen, also belongs to this class.
Finally the verb waschen shows preterite wusch and past participle wuschen, just like fallen, fangen and hangen, they seem to make a new strong verb class.

- In class 7, the various past tense forms have merged into a uniform -ee-.
  - 7a (ē-ē-ē) has one single verb: heten since scheden has gone weak.
  - 7b (ō-ē-ō) also includes one verb: lopen, stoten has gone weak but it kept its strong past participle stoten.
  - 7c has lost cohesion. 7c verb holen (from Old Saxon haldan) has regular heel in the past tense and past participle holen, but fallen, fangen, hangen and gahn (from Old Saxon gangan) show full and fullen, fung and fullen, hung and hungen, gung/güng (but past participlegahn) in the preterite and past participle, all with a short -u-. Class 6 verb waschen has also joined this "new class" and has preterite and past participle wusch and wuschen.
  - 7d (ā-ē-ā) verbs include: laten and slapen, raden and braden are semi-strong as they still have their strong past participles raden and braden (though a weak form braadt may be encountered). Blasen has gone weak.
  - 7e (ō-ē-ō) is reduced to one single verb: ropen. This subgroup had become similar to 7b already in Old Saxon.

== North Germanic ==
Changes from Proto-Germanic to Old Norse:

- ē > ā
- a-mutation: u > o when a follows in the next syllable. This affected the past participles of classes 2–4. However, an intervening m or n + consonant blocked this, so the past participle of class 3a kept u.
- Extension of umlaut to back vowels, causing it to apply also to verbs of class 6.
- v- is lost before u or o.
- -n is lost from the infinitive and many inflectional endings.
- Voiced plosives (but not fricatives) are devoiced word-finally. In Old West Norse, this later causes loss of a preceding nasal.
- Breaking of e to ja in most environments, and of eu to jū/jō.

Class	Part 1	Part 2	Part 3	Part 4	Verb meaning
1	ríða	reið	riðu	riðinn	to ride
2a	frjósa drjúpa	fraus draup	frusu drupu	frosinn dropinn	to freeze to drip
2b	lúka	lauk	luku	lokinn	to finish
3a	binda	batt	bundu	bundinn	to bind
3b	verða gjalda	varð galt	urðu guldu	orðinn goldinn	to become to pay
4	bera vefa	bar vaf	báru váfu	borinn ofinn	to bear to weave
5	lesa	las	lásu	lesinn	to gather, to read
6	ala taka	ól tók	ólu tóku	alinn tekinn	to grow, to produce to take
7a	heita	hét	hétu	heitinn	to be called
7b	hlaupa	hljóp	hljópu	hlaupinn	to leap
7c	halda	helt	heldu	haldinn	to hold
7d	gráta	grét	grétu	grátinn	to cry
7e	blóta	blét	blétu	blótinn	to sacrifice

- In class 7, several reduplicated verbs are retained: róa reri ("to row"), sá seri ("to sow"), snúa sneri ("to turn").

=== Danish ===
Class	Part 1	Part 2 & 3	Part 4	Verb meaning
1	bide	bed	bidt	to bite
2	skyde	skød	skudt	to shoot
3a	binde	bandt	bundet	to bind
3b	hjælpe	hjalp	hjulpet	to help
4	bære	bar	båret	to bear
5	ligge	lå	ligget	to lay
6	drage	drog	draget	to draw
7a	hedde	hed	heddet	to be called
7b	løbe	løb	løbet	to run
7c	falde	faldt	faldet	to fall
7d	græde	græd	grædt	to cry

Class 1

This class has generalised part 2 over part 3 creating a past tense in 'e'. The class can be split up by the different vowels the supine can take:

- with 'e' supine: blive, drive, fise, glide, gnide, gribe, hive, knibe, pibe, ride, rive, skride, skrige, skrive, slibe, snige, stige, svide / svie, svige, vige, vride.
- with 'i' supine: bide, fnise, lide, skide, slide, smide, stride, trine.

Class 2

This class has generalised part 2 over part 3 creating a past tense in 'ø'. The class can be split up by the different vowels the supine can take:

- with 'u' supine: bryde, byde, fortryde, lyde, skyde.
- with 'y' supine: betyde, flyde, fnyse, gyde, gyse, nyde, nyse, skryde, snyde.
- with 'ø' supine: fyge, krybe, ryge, smyge, stryge.

Anomalous:

- fryse – frøs – frosset
- flyve – fløj – fløjet
- lyve – løj – løjet

Class 3

This class has disintegrated into a number of smaller subgroups, all its members have generalised part 2 over part 3 creating a past tense with 'a'.

class 3a:

- with 'i' in present tense and 'u' supine: binde, drikke, finde, rinde, slippe, spinde, springe, stikke, svinde, svinge, tvinde, tvinge, vinde.
- with 'i' in present tense and 'i' supine: briste, klinge, stinke.
- with 'y' in present tense and 'u' supine: synge, synke.

class 3b:

- with 'æ' in present tense and 'u' supine: brække (strong forms are archaic), hjælpe, sprække, trække, træffe.
- with 'æ' in present tense and 'æ' supine: gælde, hænge, skælve

Class 4

Class 4 has most of its members moved to class 3. It is marked by 'a' in the past tense and å in the supine. Regular class 4 strong roots: bære, skære, stjæle

Anomalous: These two verbs were influenced by a preceding 'w':

- sove – sov – sovet
- komme – kom – kommet

Class 5

Class 5 this class has lost cohesion. It is marked by 'å' or 'a' in the past tense and the supine has the same vowel as the infinitive.

- With å in the past: se, æde
- With a in the past: bede, gide, give, kvæde, sidde

Anomalous:

- ligge – lå – ligget
- tie – tav – tied
- være – var – været used to belong to this class as well but has irregular present tense in er.

Class 6

Class 6 is marked by 'o' in the past tense and the supine has the same vowel as the infinitive.

Regular strong roots: drage, fare, jage, lade, tage.

Anomalous:

- le – lo – let/leet
- slå – slog – slået (slaget)
- stå – stod – stået
- sværge – svor – svoret

Class 7

Danish has removed the vowel alternation between the past and present tenses (except for få and gå)

- class 7a: hedde – hed – heddet
- class 7b: løbe – løb – løbet
- class 7c: falde – faldt – faldet, holde – holdt – holdt

- anomalous: få – fik – fået, gå – gik – gået

- class 7d: græde – græd – grædt

=== Norwegian Nynorsk ===
Changes from Old Norse to modern Norwegian Nynorsk:

- á > å
- Long vowels are usually no longer marked as such: é > e, í > i, ó > o, ú > u, ý > y, œ/ǿ > ø
- jó/jú > y

Class	Part 1	Part 2 & 3	Part 4	Verb meaning
1	bite ri(de)	beit rei(d)	biten riden	to bite to ride
2a	fryse	fraus	frosen	to freeze
2b	suge	saug	sogen	to suck
3a	binde brenne	batt brann	bunden brunnen	to bind to burn
3b	verte	vart	vorten	to become
4	bere	bar	boren	to bear
5	lese	las	lesen	to read
6	ale take	ol tok	alen teken	to grow, to produce to take
7a	heite	het	heitt	to be called
7c	halde	heldt	halden	to hold
7d	gråte	gret	gråten	to cry

- In class 6, one verb, fara (to fare, travel), has retained its marked long vowel: fór.
- Multiple of the verbs found in class 7 in Old Norse have gone weak. For instance, although heite (7a) have retained its strong preterite, it has lost its strong supine.

=== Swedish ===
Class	Part 1	Part 2 & 3	Part 4	Verb meaning
1	bita	bet	biten	to bite
2a	flyga	flög	flugen	to fly
2b	suga	sög	sugen	to suck
3a	binda	band	bunden	to bind
3b	svälta	svalt	svulten	to starve
4	bära	bar	buren	to wear, carry
5	äta, ge	åt, gav	äten, given	to eat, to give
6	fara	for	faren	to travel
7b	löpa	löpte	lupen	to run
7c	hålla	höll	hållen	to hold
7d	gråta	grät	gråten	to cry

Class 1

Unlike Danish, this class is still uniform in Swedish, all verbs have an ‘e’(eː) in the past tense, the supine has the same vowel as the present tense.

Regular class 1 verbs (iː-eː-iː): bita, bliva / bli, driva, fisa, glida, gnida, gripa, kliva, knipa, kvida, lida, niga, pipa, rida, riva, skina, skita, skrida, skrika, skriva, slita, smita, snika, sprida, stiga, strida, svida, svika, tiga, vika, vina, vrida

Verbs for which the strong forms are dated: lita, smida, snida, trivas

Class 2

In Swedish this class split up into multiple patterns all verbs have an ‘ö’ (øː) in the past tense:

2a

- With 'y' in the present tense and 'u' in the supine (yː-øː-ʉː): bryta, drypa, flyga, flyta, frysa, klyva, knyta, krypa, nypa, nysa, ryta, skryta, smyga, snyta, stryka, tryta,
- With 'y' in the present tense and a shortend 'y' in the supine (yː-øː-ʏ): dyka, fnysa, fyka, lyda, mysa, pysa, ryka, rysa, strypa,
- With 'ju' in the present tense and 'ju' in the supine (ʉː-øː-ʉː): bjuda, gjuta, ljuda, ljuga, ljuta, njuta, sjuda, skjuta, tjuta

2b

- Class 2b looks similar to the 2a verbs with ‘ju’ (ʉː-øː-ʉː): sluka, sluta, stupa, suga, supa, duga (former preterite-presens)

Other

- A new pattern that is associated with the class 2 inflections emerged in the modern language with short vowel instead of the normal long ones (ɵ-œ-ɵ). It contains sjunga, sjunka (both former class 3a verbs), and by analogy hugga (former class 7b) which adopted this pattern as well.

Class 3

Class 3a is well preserved and has a predictable pattern, with 'a' in the past tense and 'u'(ɵ) in the supine. Class 3b on the other hand has shrunk in the modern language to only a few members, most of the remaining verbs now often appear with weak forms as well, making this subclass fairly unstable.

Regular class 3a verbs (ɪ-a-ɵ): binda, brinna, brista, dimpa, dricka, finna, förnimma (originally class 4), gitta, hinna, klicka, klinga, rinna, simma (also weak), sitta (originally class 5), skrinna, slinka, slinta, slippa, spilla (also weak), spinna, spricka, springa, spritta, sticka, stinga, stinka, svinna (försvinna), tvinga, vinna

Regular class 3b verbs (ɛ-a-ɵ:): smälla, skälva, smälta, svälta, värpa

Anomalous: The verb varda, is declined vart-vorden. But it is now only used in the past tense (as an alternative for the past tense of bliva)

Class 4

This class has become small, only three regular verbs remain, they have a long ‘a’ (ɑː) in the past tense and a long ‘u’ (ʉː) in the supine.

Regular class 4 verbs (ɛː-ɑː-ʉː): bära, stjäla, skära

The following verbs are influenced by a preceding ‘w’ which was lost:

- komma – kom – kommit
- sova – sov – sovit

Class 5

With å (oː) past: äta, se, ligga

With a (ɑː) past: be / bedja, dräpa (strong forms are poetic), förgäta, ge / giva, kväda

Anomalous:

- vara used to belong to this class as well but has irregular present tense in 'är'.

Class 6

With 'a' in present tense and supine (ɑː-u:-ɑː): begrava, dra / draga, fara, gala, ta / taga

With 'å' in present tense and 'a' in the supine (oː-u:-ɑː): slå, två (now mostly weak)

Anomalous:

- dö – dog – dött
- le – log – lett
- stå – stod – stått
- svära/svärja – svor – svurit
- växa – växte – vuxit

Class 7

- 7b: löpa – lopp – lupit (nowadays mostly weak)
- 7c: hålla – höll – hållit, falla – föll – fallit

- anomalous: få – fick – fått, gå – gick – gått

- 7d: gråta – grät – gråtit, låta – lät – låtit

== Sources ==
- Alfred Bammesberger, Der Aufbau des germanischen Verbalsystems, Heidelberg 1986.
- Cornelius van Bree, Historische grammatica van het Nederlands, Dordrecht 1987.
- W. G. Brill, Nederlandsche spraakleer; ten gebruike bij inrichtingen van hooger onderwijs, Leiden 1871
- Frans van Coetsem, Ablaut and Reduplication in the Germanic Verb (=Indogermanische Bibliothek. vol 3), Heidelberg: Winter Verlag, 1993, ISBN 3-8253-4267-0.
- Jerzy Kuryłowicz and Manfred Mayrhofer, Indogermanische Grammatik, Heidelberg 1968–9.
- Marcin Krygier, The Disintegration of the English Strong Verb System, Frankfurt c.1994.
- Richard Hogg, A Grammar of Old English, Oxford 1992.
- Wilhelm Braune, revised by Walther Mitzka, Althochdeutsche Grammatik, Tübingen 1961.
- Donald Ringe (2006). From Proto-Indo-European to Proto-Germanic (PDF). A Linguistic History of English (1st ed.). New York City: Oxford University Press. ISBN 978-0-19-928413-9. OCLC 64554645. OL 7405151M. Wikidata Q131605459.
- Elmar Seebold, Vergleichendes und etymologisches Wörterbuch der germanischen starken Verben, The Hague 1970.
- Guus Kroonen, Etymological Dictionary of Proto-Germanic, Leiden 2013.
