= A-umlaut =

A-umlaut may refer to:

- Ä, the letter A with an umlaut
- Germanic a-mutation, a historic sound change in Northwest Germanic languages
- Å
