= Frans Van Coetsem =

Belgian-American linguist

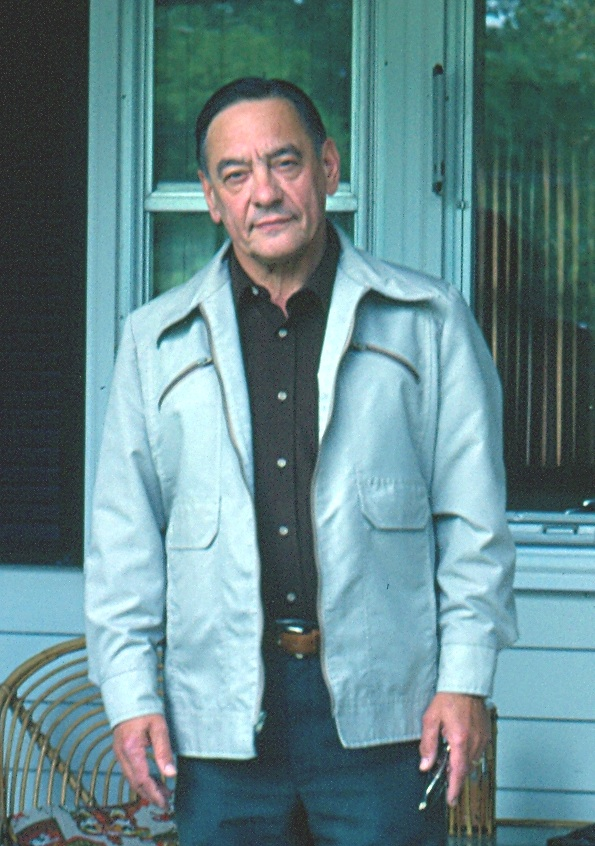
Frans Van Coetsem (Summer 1982; Ithaca, NY, USA)

Frans (Camille Cornelis) Van Coetsem (14 April 1919 – 11 February 2002) was a Belgian (Flemish) linguist. After an academic career in Flanders and the Netherlands he was appointed professor at Cornell University in 1968, and consequently he emigrated to the US where he naturalized as an American citizen.

== Life ==
Coetsem was born on 14 April 1919 in Geraardsbergen, a small town in the southeastern part of the province of East Flanders, on the Franco-Dutch language border. His native language was the (Dutch) dialect of Geraardsbergen. At a very early age, he lost both his parents, and his aunt and uncle raised him and sent him to a French-language boarding school. After finishing high school in 1939, he attended a Nivelles "régendat" (a teacher training college below university level), also a French-language school. He was dissatisfied, therefore switched to the Catholic University of Leuven to study Germanic philology. (At the time, "Germanic philology" included Dutch, English and German languages and literatures as well as a number of courses in philosophy and history). Before graduating, he had worked as an interpreter for the British armed forces during the Allied invasion of Germany. He graduated in 1946; his undergraduate thesis dealt with the sounds and the morphology of his native Geraardsbergen dialect. Less than a year later, on 30 April 1947, he married. His Ph.D. thesis, which he defended in 1952, was also devoted to the sounds and the morphology of the Geraardsbergen dialect; his thesis supervisor was L. Grootaers.

However, before he had obtained his degree, he had been hired by the Woordenboek der Nederlandsche Taal (WNT) as a trainee editor, which meant moving to Wassenaar, near his job in Leiden. There, he was coached by K.H. Heeroma, who also assisted him in choosing the subject of his "Aggregatie voor het Hoger Onderwijs", which he obtained in 1956. His thesis, published by the Royal Netherlands Academy of Arts and Sciences (KNAW) the same year, was a significant breakthrough in the comparative study of the Germanic languages, and it established his international reputation in the field.

In 1957, he was appointed successor to his supervisor L. Grootaers [†1956] at the Germanic Philology department of the Catholic University of Leuven, and he moved back to Belgium. However, in 1963, he also became Extraordinary Professor of comparative Germanic linguistics at Leiden University.

Cornell University invited him as visiting professor for the 1965–1966 academic year. Its research facilities as well as the opportunity to teach mainly graduate students made him decide in 1968 to accept Cornell's offer of tenure.

At Cornell, he supervised a number of Ph.D. students, all of whom went on to have academic careers. After his retirement in 1989, he remained active in supervising graduate students and continuing his research. It was mainly as an emeritus professor that he wrote his important works about language contact, some of which were unfinished at the time of his death and were published posthumously.

About five years after his wife's death, which had occurred on 26 January 1993, he was diagnosed with cancer, which caused his death on 11 February 2002.

== Work ==
=== Teacher ===
Coetsem was able to hold his students' attention, whether they were over two hundred, as in his introductory phonetics course at the Catholic University of Leuven, or less than a dozen, seated around the big table in his Cornell office. His lectures were well planned, and he gave them with enthusiasm. In fact, he could argue a point with real passion, when his blackboard was liable to look like an abstract expressionist painting; he was not known for orthodox didactics. However, his argumentation was always clear, and he never lost the big picture, even when a student's question would send him off on a tangent. That often happened, for he welcomed questions: he took his students seriously. (The informality between teaching staff and students was another reason for him to move to Cornell.) He used those occasions to discuss problems on which his research was focusing, which often took his students to the outer edge of modern linguistic research.

As a thesis supervisor, he encouraged his students to think critically and follow alternative methods, which resulted in a wide scope of Ph.D. theses.

=== Researcher ===
Coetsem considered doing research a true, if nonreligious, calling. What he wrote was always the result of thorough study, and his carefully worded argumentation was thought out to its furthest consequences. Two incidents in his life reveal the stringent requirements that he thought research imposed, and they show how demanding he was in his own work.

While writing his Ph.D. thesis, he had gradually come to see that the neogrammarian framework in which he was working was out of date. That made him categorically refuse to publish his thesis, in spite of its excellence.

The 1956 publication of his habilitation, highly specialised as it was, sold out fairly quickly, and the KNAW had it reprinted, unchanged and published in 1964 without his knowledge. When he eventually found out, he demanded and obtained all copies that were still unsold to be called back and for a notice to be inserted to the effect that he would have wanted to modify certain parts, in view of recent research.

He could get very upset at researchers whose work was not careful or who used it as a means of self-promotion. However, he respected serious researchers, whatever their orientation or philosophy.

The history of Toward a Grammar of Proto-Germanic is revealing in that respect. He had planned the work as a modern successor to Eduard Prokosch's 1939 A Comparative Germanic Grammar, and he had brought together a number of distinguished historical linguists for the purpose. However, the chapters that they contributed were very diverse in nature (some were suitable for a textbook, others contributed original and advanced research) and in approach (some were clearly structuralist, others worked within generative linguistics). Coetsem respected his authors and published their contributions as they were, rather than imposing a format or an approach, though that forced the original plan to be abandoned. The book was a series of contributions Toward a Grammar of Proto-Germanic, rather than a grammar of Proto-Germanic proper.

Coetsem's research ranged wide, and his knowledge of general linguistics was vast. His own research can usefully be assigned to four subfields of linguistics.

His first research (his Ph.D. and his work at the WNT) was on Dutch, and he would work on Dutch throughout his career, focusing often on variation within Dutch: between the Netherlands and Flanders, his 1957 article on the national border between the Netherlands and Flanders as a language border, brief as it was, being cited extensively, and between the dialects and the standard language. He was also the linguistic expert behind a highly popular language program on the standard language that had a ten-year run (1962–1972) on Belgian (Flemish) television. His interest in language variation was to come to full fruition after his retirement.

Coetsem was best known as a specialist in comparative Germanic linguistics. Instead of considering Proto-Germanic as undifferentiated chronologically, he realized that "Proto-Germanic" had lasted a long time and that it should be divided into periods. That insight, in combination with his knowledge of phonetics and phonology led him to a classification of the Germanic strong verbs that differs radically from the traditional one in seven classes, but it explained many of their characteristics and much of their evolution; cf. the title of his 1956 book (translated): 'The system of the strong verbs and the periodization of Proto-Germanic'. An indirect consequence was a new explanation of an old crux in comparative Germanic linguistics, the so-called ē², a long ē that appeared in Proto-Germanic (in a later stage, according to Coetsem) and differed from the long ē inherited from Proto-Indo-European, the ē¹. (The difference is still clearly recognizable in Dutch and German: hier 'here' goes back to Proto-Germanic *hē²r, but waar, wahr 'true', to Proto-Germanic *wē¹ra .) All of that led him to being asked to write the chapter on Proto-Germanic in the Kurzer Grundriß der germanischen Philologie bis 1500 (published in 1970), and it was probably the main reason for him to be invited to Cornell. He continued to work out and refine those ideas until the end of his life; witness his 1990 and 1994 books. For more information on the latter, see Germanic Parent Language, a term that he seems to have introduced.

Coetsem was trained in phonetics but not in phonology; when he was in college, phonology was a still a very young branch of linguistics. (Both N. van Wijk's Phonologie and Nikolai Trubetzkoy's Grundzüge der Phonologie were published in 1939.) However, he would do outstanding work in both. He was a member of the team that made the first radiographic images involving the use of a contrast medium of the pronunciation of some Standard Dutch vowels. They were taken at the institute of physiology of the Catholic University of Leuven, where he lectured and taught his courses at the Department of Germanic Philology; even in the 1950s, he supported interdisciplinarity. He was also a cofounder of the speech therapy program at the Catholic University of Leuven. Phonology played an important role in almost all his publications on Germanic, and it was the first aspect he dealt with in his studies about language contact. Also, problems about accent interested him, as can be witnessed by his Towards a Typology of Lexical Accent and the last publication that he himself saw through the press. In that 2001 article, he proposed the following explanation of the "violent contrast" between the British and the American lexical accent (compare the three-syllable British pronunciation of necessary with the four-syllable American one). In British English, stress is so strong that neighboring syllables are weakened or disappear altogether and has an extremely dominant accent, which is difficult for non-native speakers to imitate. America was populated by so many non-native speakers that the inadequately weakened syllables in their pronunciation ended up in the standard pronunciation of American English.

Coetsem's interest in linguistic variation led him to an in-depth investigation of language contact. He clearly distinguished between borrowing, which happens, for example, when a Dutch-speaker borrows the [ɡ] of English goal and the word, with imposition, which happens, for example, when a Dutch speaker imposes his articulatory habit on English by pronouncing goal with his Dutch [ɣ]. That distinction seems evident, but no one before him had ever formulated it so clearly or suspected its implications. A second fundamental factor that must not be remembered when language contact is studied is the degree of stability of a language component. For example, the lexicon of a language very unstable, but its morphology and syntax are much more stable. A word like save can easily be borrowed into Dutch but hardly its morphology: the Dutch principal parts of that borrowing are [ˈseːvən], [ˈseːvdə], [ɣəˈseːft]. In a number of publications, Coetsem elaborated those ideas and used them to explain all kinds of contact phenomena.

== Bibliography ==
This chronologically ordered selection, lists, besides his books, only the publications mentioned in this Wikipedia article.

- Het dialect van Geraardsbergen: Klank- en vormleer (K.U.Leuven, 1952) (Unpublished Ph.D. thesis — see § 2.2; in the library of the Catholic University of Leuven.)
- F. Van Coetsem, G. Forrez, G. Geerts, J. Tyberghein Fonetische Platenatlas (Leuven: Acco, s.d.)
- Das System der starken Verba und die Periodisierung im älteren Germanischen (Mededelingen der KNAW, afd. Letterkunde, N.R. 19.1) (Amsterdam: Noord-Hollandsche Uitgevers Maatschappij, 1956) (Reprint 1964; see § 2.2.)
- "De rijksgrens tussen Nederland en België als taalgrens in de algemene taal" in: A. Weijnen & F. van Coetsem De rijksgrens tussen België en Nederland als taalgrens (Bijdragen en Mededelingen der Dialectencommissie van de KNAW, XVIII) (Amsterdam: Noord-Hollandsche Uitgevers Maatschappij, 1957) pp. 16–28
- "Zur Entwicklung der germanischen Grundsprache" Kurzer Grundriß der germanischen Philologie bis 1500, ed. L.E. Schmitt (Berlin: Walter de Gruyter, 1970) pp. 1–93
- Frans van Coetsem & Herbert L. Kufner, eds. Toward a Grammar of Proto-Germanic (Tübingen: Niemeyer, 1972)
- Loan Phonology and the Two Transfer Types in Language Contact (Dordrecht: Foris, 1988)
- Ablaut and Reduplication in the Germanic Verb (Heidelberg: Winter, 1990)
- "The Interaction between Dialect and Standard Language, and the Question of Language Internationalization: Viewed from the standpoint of the Germanic languages" Dialect and Standard Language in the English, Dutch, German and Norwegian Language Areas = Dialekt und Standardsprache, ed. J. A. van Leuvensteijn & J.B. Berns (Verhandelingen der KNAW, Afd. Letterkunde, N.R. 150) (Amsterdam, etc.: North-Holland, 1992) pp. 15–70
- The Vocalism of the Germanic Parent Language: Systemic Evolution and Sociohistorical Context (Heidelberg: Winter, 1994)
- Towards a Typology of Lexical Accent (Heidelberg: Winter, 1996)
- A General and Unified Theory of the Transmission Process in Language Contact (Heidelberg: Winter, 2000)
- "A 'Violent Contrast' in Lexical Accent between British and American English" Leuvense Bijdragen 90 (2001) pp. 419–426
- "Topics in Contact Linguistics" Leuvense Bijdragen 92 (2003) pp. 27–99

== Honors ==
- In 1964 Frans Van Coetsem was elected "Korrespondierendes Mitglied in Übersee für den Wissenschaftlichen Rat des Instituts für Deutsche Sprache" in Mannheim, which he remained until 1997, when he resigned.
- On April 14, 1970, he was installed as a foreign correspondent of the Royal Netherlands Academy of Arts and Sciences, Humanities and Social Sciences Division.
- In 1976 he was invited by the University of Vienna as visiting professor, to teach a course on Proto-Germanic and one on the neogrammarian, structuralist and generative approaches to historical linguistics.
- He was invited by the Meertens Instituut in Amsterdam (a research institute of the KNAW) to give the keynote address at a colloquium about dialect and the standard language from 15 to 18 October 1990. His 1992 article is an expanded version of his address.

== Sources ==
Apart from what is in the Notes, the data of this article are taken from Van Coetsem's publications and from the six In Memoriams published about Frans Van Coetsem. All electronic sources mentioned in this article were retrieved in the spring of 2010.

- Buccini, Anthony F. "In memoriam Frans van Coetsem" Journal of Germanic Linguistics 15.3 (2003) pp. 267–276
- Buccini, Anthony, James Gair, Wayne Harbert & John Wolff [Untitled In Memoriam] Memorial Statements of the Faculty 2001-2002 (Cornell University)
- Leys, Odo "In memoriam Frans van Coetsem (1919–2002)" Leuvense Bijdragen 91 (2002) pp. 1–2
- Muysken, P.C. "Frans Camille Cornelis van Coetsem" Levensberichten en herdenkingen 2005 (Amsterdam: Koninklijke Nederlandse Akademie van Wetenschappen) pp. 32–35, available here
- Schaerlaekens, Annemarie "In memoriam Frans Van Coetsem (1919–2002)" L&A Alumni Logopedie en Audiologie (K.U.Leuven, 1992) nr. 3, p. 3; available here
- Tollenaere, F. de "In memoriam Frans van Coetsem" Jaarverslag 2002 (Leiden: Instituut voor Nederlandse Lexicologie) p. 6
