= Karl Verner =

Danish linguist (1846–1896)

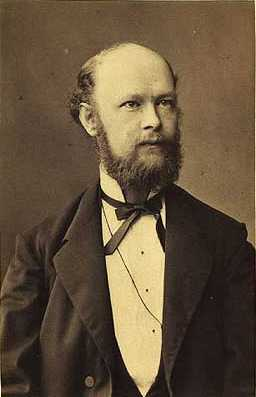
- Born: 7 March 1846; Aarhus, Denmark
- Died: 5 November 1896 (aged 50); Copenhagen, Denmark
- Citizenship: Danish
- Known for: Verner's law

Academic background
- Education: University of Copenhagen

Karl Adolph Verner (Danish: [ˈkʰɑˀl ˈvɛɐ̯ˀnɐ]; 7 March 1846 – 5 November 1896) was a Danish linguist. He is remembered best for Verner's law, which he published in 1876.

== Biography ==
Verner's interest in languages was stimulated by reading about the work of Rasmus Christian Rask. He began his university studies in 1864 in Oriental, Germanic, and Slavic languages, and then he served in the army before resuming his studies. He traveled to Russia in December 1871, spending nearly a year learning the Russian language. His first scientific paper was Nogle Raskiana (1874). He began to study the accent of Danish and Slavic languages, and he was puzzled by the fact that the Gothic words fadar and broþar have different consonants after the root vowel. He was preoccupied with the study of accent at the time, so he sought the explanation in that direction which resulted in the formation of Verner's Law. He finished the relevant paper and sent it to Vilhelm Thomsen in 1875; he published it a year later.

Despite his achievement, Verner considered himself only an amateur in Germanic philology. He long refused offers of professorship, contenting himself to be a librarian in Halle. He was taught by August Leskien, a pioneer of research into principles of sound changes, and he applied for the Bopp prize, which he received in 1877. He became a professor in 1888 when he was also elected a member of the Royal Danish Academy of Sciences and Letters.
