= Germanic a-mutation =

Historical sound change

In historical linguistics, a-mutation is a metaphonic process supposed to have taken place in late Proto-Germanic (c. 200).

== General description ==
In a-mutation, a short high vowel (*/u/ or */i/) was lowered when the following syllable contained a non-high vowel (*/a/, /oː/ or /æː/). Thus, since the change was produced by other vowels besides */a/, the term a-mutation is something of a misnomer. It has also been called "a-umlaut", "a/o-umlaut", "velar umlaut" and, formerly, "Brechung." (This last was Grimm's term, but nowadays German Brechung, and its English equivalents breaking and fracture, are generally restricted in use to other unrelated sound-changes which later affected individual Germanic languages.)

- *hurną > Old English horn "horn"
- *wiraz > Old English wer "man"

The high vowel was not lowered, however, if */j/ intervened between it and the following non-high vowel. An intervening nasal consonant followed by a consonant of any kind also blocked the process (and raised original */e/ to */i/).

- *gulþą > Old English gold "gold"
- *gulþijaną > Old English gyldan "to gild" (with later i-mutation of u to y).
- *hundaz > Old English hund "dog" (German Hund)
- *swemmaną > *swimmaną > Old English swimman "to swim"

a-mutation seems to have preceded the raising of unstressed final */oː/ to */uː/ in the dialects ancestral to Old English and Old Norse, hence in Old English the phenomenon is subject to many exceptions and apparent inconsistencies which are usually attributed to a mixture of paradigmatic leveling and phonetic context.

== Dialectal variation ==
a-mutation is more evident in some Germanic languages than others. It is widely found in Old High German, less so in other West Germanic languages and Old Norse. a-mutation is less extensive in Old East Norse (the precursor of Danish and Swedish) than Old West Norse (spoken in Norway and its colonies). There is no trace of it at all in Gothic, where the distinction between the short high and mid vowels had become allophonic (Proto-Germanic /e/ and /i/ merged). Old Gutnish, at the eastern end of the territory where Old Norse evolved, resembles Gothic in this respect. But there is some suggestion that a-mutation may have been preserved in Crimean Gothic.

- Old English fugol, fugel : Old High German fogal "bird"
- Old Gutnish hult "copse, wood" : Old English, Old Icelandic holt

Variation is found within dialects too with doublets such as Old English spora : spura "spur", spornan : spurnan "to spurn", cnocian : cnucian "to knock"; Old Icelandic fogl : fugl "bird", goð : guð "god", goll : gull "gold."

== i > e ==
According to Campbell, a-mutation of i is limited in Old English to just three words: nest "nest," spec "bacon," and wer "man." More plentiful instances of */i/ > */e/ have been cited in other West Germanic languages, with Old High German showing the greatest number of examples, including doublets such as skif : skef "ship".

The mutation is rare in Old Norse, e.g. verr "man", heðan "hence", neðan "from below" in contrast to niðr "down(wards)" and perhaps jafn "even." Instances where a-mutation has failed to occur in Old Norse can mostly be explained as analogical forms, although a palatal stop /ɡ/ or /k/ immediately preceding the /i/ in a short-root syllable has a tendency to block or reverse the process.

== u > o ==
While Proto-Germanic inherited both of the phonemes */i/ and */e/ from Proto-Indo-European, all instances of */o/ in the later languages arose from a-mutation of */u/, since Proto-Indo-European */o/ had already become Proto-Germanic */a/. a-mutation of /u/ is much more common than that of /i/ but also subject to many exceptions. In some dialects, the change may be blocked in labial contexts. Specifically, a tendency has been observed for the mutation not to occur next to initial or medial */f/ or */w/ in association with */l/. Other exceptions, in particular where there is disagreement between dialects, may be due to the word having once been a u-stem. Most dialects of late Old Dutch underwent a merger of /u/ and /o/, so that in Middle and Modern Dutch only /o/ appears, eliminating all traces of a-mutation of */u/.

The effects of a-mutation are perhaps most noticeable in certain verb types, e.g. strong verbs of classes 2, 3 and 4, where o in the past participle alternates with u in the preterite plural. For example, Old English flogen "flown" < *fluganaz alternated with flugon "they flew" < *flugun. Otherwise, where */u/ and */o/ would originally have alternated morphologically, the old Germanic languages had almost always generalised one vowel or the other throughout the paradigm, although there does occur in Old Swedish (especially in the laws of Östergötland) traces of regular alternation between /o/ and /u/ in line with a-mutation, e.g. kona (subj.) : kunu (obj.) "woman". As can be seen from the examples above, a-mutation is also found in lexical alternations.

== The diphthong */eu/ ==
In the West Germanic variety that gave rise to Old English, a-mutation did not affect the second element of the diphthong */eu/ (for which the earliest Old English texts have eu): treulesnis "faithlessness", steup- "step-" (Epinal Glossary 726, 1070); but in other branches of West Germanic */eu/ eventually became */eo/ unless followed by */w/, e.g. Old Saxon breost "breast" vs. treuwa "fidelity." In most variants of Old Norse, */eu/ > /jɒu/ > /ju:/ or /jo:/, without regard to a-mutation, e.g. Old Icelandic djúpr.

== Effects of a single nasal consonant ==
Old English derives from a type of Germanic in which single */m/ had the same effect on preceding */u/ and */e/ as a nasal stop followed by another consonant. The effect occurs in other West Germanic languages, though more erratically, and sometimes in Old Norse.

- Old Norse nema, Old High German neman : Old Frisian nima, nema, Old Saxon niman, neman : Old English niman "to take"
- Old High German gi-noman, Old Frisian nomen : Old Norse numinn, Old English numen, Old Saxon numan "taken" (past participle)
- Old High German gomo "man", Old Frisian gomo : Old Norse gumi, Old English guma, Old Saxon gumo

a-mutation was also sometimes blocked before single */n/, again with much variation among languages.

- Old Saxon honig, -eg, Old High German hona(n)g : Old English hunig (for older -æg), Old Frisian hunig, Old Norse hunang

== Alternative ideas ==
A number of scholars have questioned the traditional model of Proto-Germanic a-mutation in whole or in part. In particular, the rare a-mutation of */i/ to */e/ "as a Proto-Germanic phenomenon has always been contested." Lloyd, for example, proposed an alternative explanation for all apparent instances of a-mutation of */i/; he suggested that "the partial overlapping in Germanic of the two phonemes /i/ (represented in all environments by [i]) and /e/ (with the allophones [e] and [i]) led to the occasional development of an e-allophone of i by systemic analogy". Cercignani, on the other hand, argued that "no 'umlaut' phenomena can be assumed for Proto-Germanic", preferring to ascribe these changes to "the prehistory of the individual languages."

== See also ==
- I-mutation
- Germanic umlaut
- Vowel harmony
