= Verner's law =

Proto-Germanic sound law

A diagram of Grimm's law and Verner's law

Verner's law describes a historical sound change in the Proto-Germanic language whereby consonants that would have otherwise been the voiceless fricatives *f, *þ, *s, *h, *hʷ, when present following an unstressed syllable, evolved into the voiced fricatives *β, *ð, *z, *ɣ, *ɣʷ. (Note: In Proto-Germanic, voiced fricatives *[β ð ɣ] were allophones of their corresponding voiced plosives *[b d ɡ] when they occurred between vowels, semivowels, and liquid consonants. The situations where Verner's law applied resulted in fricatives in these very circumstances, so fricative *[b d ɡ] can be used in this context.) The law was formulated by Karl Verner, and first published in 1877.

== Problem ==
A seminal insight into how the Germanic languages diverged from their Indo-European ancestor had been established in the early nineteenth century, and had been formulated as Grimm's law. Amongst other things, Grimm's law described how the Proto-Indo-European voiceless stops *p, *t, *k, and *kʷ regularly changed into Proto-Germanic *f (bilabial fricative [ɸ]), *þ (dental fricative [θ]), *h (velar fricative [x]), and *hʷ (labio-velar fricative [xw]).

However, there appeared to be a large set of words in which the agreement of Latin, Greek, Sanskrit, Baltic, Slavic etc. guaranteed Proto-Indo-European *p, *t or *k, and yet the Germanic reflex was not the expected, unvoiced fricatives *f, *þ, *h, *hʷ but rather their voiced counterparts *β, *ð, *ɣ, *ɣʷ. A similar problem obtained with Proto-Indo-European *s, which sometimes appeared as Proto-Germanic *z.

At first, irregularities did not cause concern for scholars since there were many examples of the regular outcome. Increasingly, however, it became the ambition of linguists like the Neogrammarians to formulate general and exceptionless rules of sound change that would account for all the data (or as close to all the data as possible), not merely for a well-behaved subset of it.

One classic example of Proto-Indo-European *t → Proto-Germanic *ð is the word for 'father'. Proto-Indo-European *ph₂tḗr (here, the macron marks vowel length) → Proto-Germanic *faðēr (instead of expected *faþēr). In the structurally similar family term *bʰréh₂tēr 'brother', Proto-Indo-European *t did indeed develop as predicted by Grimm's Law (Germanic *brōþēr). Even more curiously, scholars often found both *þ and *ð as reflexes of Proto-Indo-European *t in different forms of one and the same root, e.g. werþaną 'to turn', preterite third-person singular *warþ 'he turned', but preterite third-person plural *wurðun and past participle *wurðanaz.

== Solution ==
Karl Verner is traditionally credited as the first scholar to note the factor governing the distribution of the two outcomes. Verner observed that the apparently unexpected voicing of Proto-Indo-European voiceless stops occurred if they were non-word-initial and if the vowel preceding them carried no stress in Proto-Indo-European. The original location of stress was often retained in Greek and early Sanskrit; in Germanic, though, stress eventually became fixed on the initial (root) syllable of all words.

The following table illustrates the sound changes according to Verner. In the bottom row, for each pair, the sound on the right represents the sound changed according to Verner's Law.

PIE	*p		*t		*k		*kʷ		*s	
Grimm	*ɸ		*θ		*x		*xʷ		*s	
Verner	*ɸ	*β	*θ	*ð	*x	*ɣ	*xʷ	*ɣʷ	*s	*z

The crucial difference between *patḗr and *bʰrā́tēr was therefore one of second-syllable versus first-syllable stress (compare Sanskrit pitā́ versus bhrā́tā).

The *werþaną : *wurðun contrast is likewise explained as due to stress on the root versus stress on the inflectional suffix (leaving the first syllable unstressed). There are also other Vernerian alternations, as illustrated by modern German ziehen 'to draw, pull': Old High German zogōn 'to tug, drag' ← Proto-Germanic teuhaną : *tugōną ← Pre-Germanic *déwk-o-nom : *duk-éh₂-yo-nom 'lead'.

The change described by Verner's Law also accounts for Proto-Germanic *z as the development of Proto-Indo-European *s in some words. Since this *z changed to *r in the North Germanics and in West Germanic (German, Dutch, English, Frisian), Verner's Law resulted in alternation of *s and *r in some inflectional paradigms, known as grammatischer Wechsel. For example, the Old English verb ceosan 'choose' had the past plural form curon and the past participle (ge)coren. These three forms derived from Proto-Germanic keusaną : *kuzun ~ *kuzanaz, which again derived from Pre-Germanic *géws-o-nom : *gus-únt ~ *gus-o-nós 'taste, try'. We would have **corn for chosen in Modern English if the consonants of choose and chose had not been morphologically levelled (compare the Dutch kiezen 'to choose' : verkoren 'chosen'). On the other hand, Vernerian *r has not been levelled out in English were ← Proto-Germanic *wēzun, related to English was. Similarly, English lose, though it has the weak form lost, also has the archaic form †lorn (now seen in the compounds forlorn and lovelorn) (compare Dutch verliezen : verloren); in German, on the other hand, the *s has been levelled out both in war 'was' (plural waren 'were') and verlieren 'lose' (participle verloren 'lost').

== Verner's law in Gothic ==
Whereas the North Germanic and West Germanic languages clearly show the effects of Verner's law, those patterns seldom appear in Gothic, the representative of East Germanic. This is usually thought to be because Gothic eliminated most Verner's law variants through analogy with the unaffected consonants.

== Significance ==
Karl Verner published his discovery in the article "Eine Ausnahme der ersten Lautverschiebung" (An exception to the first sound shift) in Kuhn's Journal of Comparative Linguistic Research in 1877, but he had already presented his theory on 1 May 1875 in a comprehensive personal letter to his friend and mentor, Vilhelm Thomsen.

A letter shows that Eduard Sievers had hit on the same explanation by 1874, but did not publish it.

Verner's theory was received with great enthusiasm by the young generation of comparative philologists, the so-called Junggrammatiker, because it was an important argument in favour of the Neogrammarian doctrine that the sound laws were without exceptions ("die Ausnahmslosigkeit der Lautgesetze").

== Dating the change described by Verner's law ==
The change in pronunciation described by Verner's Law must have occurred before the shift of stress to the first syllable: the voicing of the new consonant in Proto-Germanic is conditioned by which syllable is stressed in Proto-Indo-European, yet this syllabic stress has disappeared in Proto-Germanic, so the change in the consonant must have occurred at a time when the syllabic stress in earlier Proto-Germanic still conformed to the Indo-European pattern. However, the syllabic stress shift erased the conditioning environment, and made the variation between voiceless fricatives and their voiced alternants look mysteriously haphazard.

=== Which applied first: Grimm's law or Verner's law? ===
Until around the 1980s it was assumed that Verner's law was productive after Grimm's Law, and this remains the standard account: R. D. Fulk's 2018 Comparative Grammar of the Early Germanic Languages, for example, finds that 'Grimm's law should be assumed to antecede Verner's law'.

But it has been pointed out that, even if the sequence is reversed, the result can be just the same given certain conditions, and the thesis that Verner's Law might have been valid before Grimm's Law—maybe long before it—has been finding more and more acceptance. Accordingly, this order now would have to be assumed:

1. Verner's law (possible boundary for Indo-European/Germanic)
2. Grimm's law/First Sound Shift (does not mark the formation of Germanic accordingly)
3. Appearance of initial stress (third possible boundary for Indo-European/Germanic)

This chronological reordering would have far-reaching implications for the shape and development of the Proto-Germanic language. If Verner's law operated before Grimm's law, one would expect the voicing of Proto-Indo-European *p, *t, *k, and *kʷ to produce *b, *d, *g, and *gʷ, which would have been identical with the existing Proto-Indo-European voiced stops. Yet it is clear that consonants affected by Verner's law merged with the descendants of the Proto-Indo-European voiced aspirate stops, not of the plain voiced stops. The usual proposed explanation for this is to postulate aspiration in the voiceless stops of the dialect of Indo-European that gave rise to Proto-Germanic.

Here is a table describing the sequence of changes in this alternative ordering:

PIE	*p		*t		*k		*kʷ		*s	
PrePG	*pʰ		*tʰ		*kʰ		*kʷʰ		*s	
Verner	*pʰ	*bʱ	*tʰ	*dʱ	*kʰ	*ɡʱ	*kʷʰ	*ɡʷʱ	*s	*z
Grimm	*ɸ	*β	*θ	*ð	*x	*ɣ	*xʷ	*ɣʷ	*s	*z

(This can however be bypassed in the glottalic theory framework, where the voiced aspirate stops are replaced with plain voiced stops, and plain voiced stops with glottalized stops.)

Meanwhile, Noske argued that Grimm's Law and Verner's Law must have been part of a single bifurcating chain shift.

== Areal connections ==
An exact parallel to Verner's law is found in the neighboring Finnic languages, where it forms a part of the system of consonant gradation: a single voiceless consonant (*p, *t, *k, *s) becomes weakened (*b, *d, *g; *h < *z) when occurring after an unstressed syllable. As word stress in Finnic is predictable (primary stress on the initial syllable, secondary stress on odd-numbered non-final syllables), and has remained so since Proto-Uralic, this change did not produce any alternation in the shape of word roots. However, it manifests in the shape of numerous inflectional or derivational suffixes, and is therefore called "suffixal gradation".

Suffixal gradation in the Finnish partitive case
Meaning	Pre-Proto-Finnic	Proto-Finnic	modern Finnish
'tree' (nom. : part.)	*puu : *ˈpuu-ta	*puu : *puuta	puu : puuta
'hut, teepee' (nom. : part.)	*ˈkota : *ˈkota-ta	*ˈkota : *ˈkotada	kota : kotaa
'blind' (nom. : part.)	*ˈsoketa : *ˈsokeˌta-ta	*ˈsokeda : *ˈsokeˌdata	sokea : sokeata ~ sokeaa

Consonant gradation has been viewed as inheritance from Proto-Uralic, as it occurs also in other Uralic languages. In particular, suffixal gradation under identical conditions also exists in Nganasan. However, Lauri Posti argued that suffixal gradation in Finnic represents Germanic influence, in particular reflecting the pronunciation of Proto-Finnic by a hypothetical Germanic-speaking superstrate (often assumed to account for the great number of Germanic loanwords already in Proto-Finnic). The possibility of the opposite direction of influence – from Finnic to Germanic – has also been suggested.

== See also ==
- High German consonant shift
- Glossary of sound laws in the Indo-European languages
- Grimm's law
