= Middle High German verbs =

Verbs in Middle High German are divided into strong or weak verbs. Strong verbs indicate tense by a change in the quality of a vowel, while weak verbs indicate tense by the addition of an ending.

== Verb forms ==
The various forms of the Middle High German verb include the infinitive, the present participle, the past participle, and the gerund.

=== Infinitive ===
In Middle High German the infinitive usually ends in "-en" or simply "-n". The stem of the infinitive is the basic form from which all other verb forms are derived. The stem can be derived by simply taking the "-(e)n" ending off of the infinitive.

=== Present participle ===
The present participle of the verb in Middle High German is formed by adding "-de" to the infinitive. Thus, the present participle of "gëben" is "gëbende".

=== Past participle ===
The past participle in Middle High German is formed by prefixing "ge-" to the verb stem, in addition to a dental suffix ("-d-" or "-(e)t-") for weak verbs, or by prefixing "ge-" to the infinitive of a strong verb, with a possible vowel change in the stem. The past participle of "sëhen" is "gesëhen"; the past participle of "dienen" is "gedienet". These are general rules with many exceptions. As in English, the past participle can be used as part of a verbal phrase to form tenses (e.g., perfect, pluperfect), and as an adjective.

=== Gerund ===
Also called the inflected infinitive, the gerund is a verbal noun. That is, it is a verb used in the place of a noun. Middle High German has two special gerund forms, one for the dative case, and one for the genitive case. The former is created by adding "-(n)e" to the infinitive, the latter by adding "-(n)es" to the infinitive: "gëben(n)e/gëben(n)es", "sëhen(n)e/sëhen(n)es", and "tuon(n)e/ tuon(n)es". A verbal noun in the nominative case is identical to the infinitive form.

=== Number, person, tense, mood, voice, and basic paradigms ===
Middle High German had two numbers, singular and plural, and three persons. The language had two simple tenses: present and preterite (or "simple past"). In addition, there were also three tenses that made use of auxiliary verbs: perfect, pluperfect, and future, all much less frequently used than in the modern language.

Middle High German had three moods, indicative, imperative, and subjunctive mood (used much more frequently in Middle High German than in the modern language). In addition to wishes and other unreal conditions, it is used after imperatives, after indefinite pronouns (such as swaȥ and swer), and after comparatives. In addition, it often occurs in subordinate clauses where there is otherwise no evident need for a subjunctive. Two voices are exhibited in Middle High German: active and passive.

== Verb categories and classes ==
Verbs in Middle High German are divided into two basic categories, based upon the formation of the preterite: strong and weak. Strong verbs exhibit an alternation of the stem vowel in the preterite and past participle (called apophony, vowel gradation, or, traditionally, Ablaut), while in weak verbs, the vowel generally remains the same as in the present tense, and a dental suffix (usually "-(e)t-") is attached. In addition to the strong and weak classes, there are a few minor classes of verbs: the so-called "preterite-presents", which exhibit a strong preterite-like vowel alternation in the present tense, contracted verbs, which have full forms as well as shortened versions, and anomalous verbs, which are simply irregular and do not conform to a general pattern.

== Weak verbs ==
Weak verbs consist of two distinct classes: Class I, a small subset that exhibits changes in the stem vowel in present versus preterite, in addition to the dental suffix, and Class II, which covers the vast majority of weak verbs in which the stem vowel remains the same throughout the paradigm. Weak, Class I verbs are the descendants of a group of Old High German verbs ending in "-jan". They exhibit different stem vowels in the present and preterite (a result of umlaut from the "-jan" ending). Weak, Class II verbs exhibit no changes in the stem vowels in the present and preterite, i.e., the stem vowel in the present tense remains the same in the preterite (as well as in the past participle). An example of the weak paradigm for the Weak, Class II verb "lëben" ('to live') in the indicative and subjunctive moods follows.

Weak Conjugation
Infinitive:		lëben		Present Participle:		lëbende	
Gerund:		lëben(n)e, lëben(n)es		Past Participle:		gelëbet	
Imperative:		lëbe, lëbet, lëbe(n) wir					
Indicative				Subjunctive			
Present		Preterite		Present		Preterite	
ich	lëbe	ich	lëbete	ich	lëbe	ich	lëbete
du	lëbest	du	lëbetest	du	lëbest	du	lëbetest
ër	lëbet	ër	lëbete	ër	lëbe	ër	lëbete
wir	lëben	wir	lëbeten	wir	lëben	wir	lëbeten
ir	lëbet	ir	lëbetet	ir	lëbet	ir	lëbetet
si	lëbent	si	lëbeten	si	lëben	si	lëbeten

== Strong verbs ==
Strong verbs exhibit patterns of vowel change, called apophony, in the various numbers and tenses of the verb. Strong verbs are further divided according to the pattern of vowel change (the so-called "Ablautreihe"), of which there are seven major subdivisions, or classes, and often further subdivisions within a given class.

Below is a paradigm of the conjugation of a typical Middle High German strong verb, "gëben" (Modern German 'geben', English 'to give') for the indicative and subjunctive present and preterite, along with its principal parts.

Strong Conjugation
Infinitive:		gëben		Present Participle:		gëbende	
Gerund:		gëben(n)e, gëben(n)es		Past Participle:		gegëben	
Imperative:		gip, gëbet, gëbe(n) wir					
Indicative				Subjunctive			
Present		Preterite		Present		Preterite	
ich	gibe	ich	gap	ich	gëbe	ich	gæbe
du	gibest	du	gæbe	du	gëbest	du	gæbest
ër	gibet	ër	gap	ër	gëbe	ër	gæbe
wir	gëben	wir	gâben	wir	gëben	wir	gæben
ir	gëbet	ir	gâbet	ir	gëbet	ir	gæbet
si	gëbent	si	gâben	si	gëben	si	gæben

In the present indicative singular, many of the classes exhibit a change in the stem vowel (in this case, e -> i). The stem vowel of the indicative preterite singular is often different from that of the plural forms. The 2nd person singular preterite indicative has yet another stem vowel; it is usually the same as that of the preterite subjunctive. The 3rd person plural present indicative ending is also different from Modern German but is the same as that of the weak verbs: "-ent". However, the endings in the indicative preterite are different from those in the weak paradigm: 1st and 3rd person singular have no ending, and 2nd person singular has "-e". In addition, the spelling changes when final devoicing takes place in the 1st and 3rd person singular preterite indicative, where appropriate.

The subjunctive shows more regularity, with no stem vowel differences in singular versus plural and identical endings in both present and preterite. In the present subjunctive, the vowel is generally the same as that of the infinitive throughout, and in the preterite, the vowel is the umlauted version of the preterite plural indicative vowel. The 2nd person singular preterite form has the "-est" ending, the 3rd person singular subjunctive ends in "-e", and the 3rd person plural subjunctive has the "-en" ending, unlike their corresponding indicative counterparts.

Some early Middle High German texts have the 2nd person singular ending in "-es" rather than the more common "-est" in all tenses and moods. The addition of the "-t" to this ending began in the late Old High German era and was solidified fairly early on in the Middle High German era. (Its source is an enclitic: the 2nd person singular pronoun "du" often appeared after the verb: "gibis + du" ('give', the 2nd personal singular form in Old High German + 'you'), which eventually became "gibistu", and finally, the "-t" was reanalyzed by speakers as part of the verb conjugation itself, giving us "gibest (du)".

=== Strong verb vowel alternation table ===
The table below summarizes the defining characteristics and vowel alternation patterns of the strong verb classes:

Class		Inf. Root	Pres.		Pret.		Subj.		Past Part.
Class		Inf. Root	Sing.	Plur.	Sing.	Plur.	Pres.	Pret.	Past Part.
I	a	î	î	î	ei	i	î	i	i
I	b	î + h,w	î	î	ê	i	î	i	i
II	a	ie	iu	ie	ou	u	ie	ü	o
II	a	û	û	û	ou	u	û	ü	o
II	a	iuw	iuw	iuw	ou	ûw	iuw	iu	ûw
II	b	ie + d,t,s,z,h	iu	ie	ô	u	ie	ü	o
III	a	i + m/n + Cons.	i	i	a	u	i	ü	u
III	b	e + l/r + Cons.	i	e	a	u	e	ü	o
IV	a	e + m,n,l,r,ch	i	e	a	â	e	æ	o
IV	b	o + m	o/u	o	a	â	o/u	æ	o
V	a	e	i	e	a	â	e	æ	e
V	b	i	i	i	a	â	i	æ	e
VI	a	a	a^{1st} e^{2nd/3rd}	a	uo	uo	a	üe	a
VI	b	e	e	e	uo	uo	e	üe	a/o
VII	a	a	a (e^{2nd/3rd})	a	ie	ie	a	ie	a
VII	b	â	â (æ^{2nd/3rd})	â	ie	ie	â	ie	â
VII	c	ei	ei	ei	ie	ie	ei	ie	ei
VII	d	ô	ô	ô	ie	ie	ô	ie	ô
VII	e	ou	ou	ou	ie	ie	ou	ie	ou
VII	f	uo	uo	uo	ie	ie	uo	ie	uo

== Preterite-presents ==
Another important group of verbs are the so-called "preterite-presents". These verbs exhibit a present tense with vowel alternations and endings that are similar to those of a strong preterite, except in the 2nd person singular, where the ending is -t or -st (instead of the usual -e of strong verbs), and the 3rd person plural ending, which is the expected -ent of other verbs in the present indicative. Their preterites are generally formed as those of the weak verbs, as are their past participles (where one exists). This group is fairly small and includes the modal auxiliaries. "Wiȥȥen" (Modern German 'wissen', English 'to know') will serve as an example of this group.

Preterite-Present Conjugation
Infinitive:		wiȥȥen		Present Participle:		wiȥȥende	
Gerund:		wiȥȥen(n)e, wiȥȥen(n)es		Past Participle:		gewist, gewest	
Imperative:		weiȥ, wiȥȥet, wiȥȥe(n) wir					
Indicative				Subjunctive			
Present		Preterite		Present		Preterite	
ich	weiȥ	ich	wisse/wesse/wiste/weste	ich	wiȥȥe	ich	wisse/wesse/wiste/weste
du	weist	du	wissest/wessest/wistest/westest	du	wiȥȥest	du	wissest/wessest/wistest/westest
ër	weiȥ	ër	wisse/wesse/wiste/weste	ër	wiȥȥe	ër	wisse/wesse/wiste/weste
wir	wiȥȥen	wir	wissen/wessen/wisten/westen	wir	wiȥȥen	wir	wissen/wessen/wisten/westen
ir	wiȥȥet	ir	wisset/wesset/wistet/westet	ir	wiȥȥet	ir	wisset/wesset/wistet/westet
si	wiȥȥent	si	wissen/wessen/wisten/westen	si	wiȥȥen	si	wissen/wessen/wisten/westen

The preterite forms use -ss- instead of -ȥȥ-.. This is the easiest way to distinguish preterite forms of "wiȥȥen" from present tense forms. The past participle is either "gewist" or "gewest", the latter of which could be confused for the past participle of "sîn" (Modern German 'sein', English 'to be'), one form of which is "geweset".

The modals themselves are a somewhat larger class in Middle High German than in Modern German, and where there are superficial resemblances in the form, there is often a difference in meaning. Following are the common preterite-presents, including the modals, in Middle High German with their associated meanings:

1. "tugen"/"tügen" (Modern German 'taugen'): to be of use (often used impersonally).
2. "gunnen"/"günnen" (Modern German 'gönnen'): to grant.
3. "kunnen"/"künnen" (Modern German 'können'): knowing how to do things (this is not equivalent to the Modern German meaning, or the English meaning of 'can'.
4. "durfen"/"dürfen" (Modern German 'dürfen'): to need (not equivalent to the Modern German meaning, except in the Modern German form 'bedürfen').
5. "turren"/"türren": to dare.
6. "süln"/"suln" (Modern German 'sollen): ought to/should; this modal was also one of several possible choices for the future tense auxiliary, is in English 'shall'.
7. "mugen"/"mügen"/"magen"/"megen" (Modern German 'mögen'): can, may (not equivalent to the Modern German meaning of 'to like', but rather the same sense in "das mag sein" ('that may be'). This is the modal used in the sense of Modern German 'können'.
8. "müeȥen" (Modern German 'müssen'): must, to have to. This can also mean 'may' in the sense of a wish.
9. "wëllen"/"wollen" (Modern German 'wollen'): to want.

== Contracted verbs ==
Another small group of verbs are the so-called "contracted" verbs, named for their characteristic shortened forms alongside their regular forms:

1. "lân" (from "lâzen", Modern German 'lassen', English 'to let')
2. "vân" (from "vâhen", Modern German 'anfangen', English 'to begin')
3. "hân" (from "hâhen", Modern German 'hängen', English 'to hang')
4. "hân" (from "hâben", Modern German 'haben', English 'to have') This verb generally exhibits the contracted forms in the indicative and the uncontracted forms in the subjunctive.

== Anomalous verbs ==
Finally, there are several anomalous or irregular verbs that do not fit into a set pattern, and will thus make up the remaining group:

1. "tuon" (Modern German 'tun', English 'to do')
2. "gân"/"gên" (Modern German 'gehen', English 'to go')
3. "stân"/"stên" (Modern German 'stehen', English 'to stand')
4. "sîn"/"wesen" (Modern German 'sein', English 'to be')

== Sources ==
- Shay, Scott (2006). Middle High German Verbs. Washington, DC: Wardja Press. ISBN 1-4116-7932-6.
