= Old Saxon grammar =

The grammar of Old Saxon is highly inflected, similar to that of Old English or Latin. As an ancient Germanic language, the morphological system of Old Saxon is similar to that of the hypothetical Proto-Germanic reconstruction, retaining many of the inflections thought to have been common in Proto-Indo-European and also including characteristically Germanic constructions such as the umlaut. Among living languages, Old Saxon morphology most closely resembles that of modern High German.

Nouns, pronouns, adjectives and determiners were fully inflected with five grammatical cases (nominative, accusative, genitive, dative, and instrumental), two grammatical numbers (singular and plural) and three grammatical genders (masculine, feminine, and neuter).

First- and second-person personal pronouns also had dual forms for referring to groups of two people, in addition to the usual singular and plural forms. The instrumental case was somewhat rare and occurred mostly in the masculine singular, but also sometimes in the neuter singular. It never occurred in the feminine nor plural. Instrumental could typically be replaced by the dative.

Adjectives, pronouns and (sometimes) participles agreed with their antecedent nouns in case, number, and gender. Finite verbs agreed with their subject in person and number.

Nouns came in numerous declensions (with deep parallels in Latin, Ancient Greek and Sanskrit). Verbs came in ten main conjugations (seven strong and two weak + the remains of a third weak class), each with numerous subtypes, as well as a few additional smaller conjugations and a handful of irregular verbs.

The main difference from other ancient Indo-European languages, such as Latin, is that verbs can be conjugated in only two tenses (vs. the six "tenses" – really tense/aspect combinations – of Latin), and, like Old English, have no synthetic passive voice (although it did still exist in Gothic).

Gender in nouns was grammatical, as opposed to the natural gender that prevails in modern English. That is, the grammatical gender of a given noun did not necessarily correspond to its natural gender, even for nouns referring to people. For example, thiu sunna (the Sun) was feminine, thê mâno (the Moon) was masculine, and that wîf "the woman/wife" was neuter. (Compare Old English sēo sunne (f.), se mōna (m.) and þæt wīf (n.), but also modern German die Sonne, der Mond, das Weib.) Pronominal usage could reflect either natural or grammatical gender, when it is conflicted.

== Morphology ==
=== Verbs ===
Verbs in Old Saxon are divided into strong and weak verbs. Strong verbs indicate tense by a change in the quality of a vowel, while weak verbs indicate tense by the addition of an ending.

Here is a quick sum up of all the Old Saxon classes of strong and weak verbs. More information on these classes are given below.

		Strong verbs							Weak verbs
Conjugation	Pronoun	'to ride'	'to fly'	'to help'	'to break'	'to speak'	'to travel'	'to wield'	'to deem'	'to declare'	'to say'
Infinitive		rīdan	fliogan	helpan	brekan	sprekan	faran	waldan	dōmian	mahlōn	seggian
Present indicative	ik	rīdu	fliugu	hilpu	briku	spriku	faru	waldu	dōmiu	mahlo(n)	seggiu
Present indicative	thū	rīdis	fliugis	hilpis	brikis	sprikis	feris	weldis	dōmis	mahlos	sages
Present indicative	hē/it/siu	rīdid	fliugid	hilpid	brikid	sprikid	ferid	weldid	dōmid	mahlod	saged
Present indicative	wī/gī/sia	rīdad	fliogad	helpad	brekad	sprekad	farad	waldad	dōmiad	mahliod	seggiad
Past indicative	ik/hē/it/siu	rēd	flōg	help	brak	sprak	fōr	wēld	dōmda	mahloda	sagda
Past indicative	thū	ridi	flugi	hulpi	brāki	sprāki	fōri	wēldi	dōmdes	mahlodes	sagdes
Past indicative	wī/gī/sia	ridun	flugun	hulpun	brākun	sprākun	fōrun	wēldun	dōmdun	mahlodun	sagdun
Present subjunctive	ik/hē/it/siu	rīde	flioge	helpe	breke	spreke	fare	walde	dōmie	mahlo	seggie
Present subjunctive	thū	rīdes	flioges	helpes	brekes	sprekes	fares	waldes	dōmies	mahlos	seggies
Present subjunctive	wī/gī/sia	rīden	fliogen	helpen	breken	spreken	faren	walden	dōmien	mahlion	seggien
Past subjunctive	ik/hē/it/siu	ridi	flugi	hulpi	brāki	sprāki	fōri	wēldi	dōmdi	mahlodi	sagdi
Past subjunctive	thū	ridis	flugis	hulpis	brākis	sprākis	fōris	wēldis	dōmdis	mahlodis	sagdis
Past subjunctive	wī/gī/sia	ridin	flugin	hulpin	brākin	sprākin	fōrin	wēldin	dōmdin	mahlodin	sagdin
Imperative	Singular	rīd	fliog	help	brek	sprek	far	wald	dōmi	mahlo	sage
Imperative	Plural	rīdad	fliogad	helpad	brekad	sprekad	farad	waldad	dōmiad	mahliod	seggiad
Present participle		rīdandi	fliogandi	helpandi	brekandi	sprekandi	farandi	waldandi	dōmiandi	mahlondi	seggiandi
Past participle		(gi)ridan	(gi)flogan	(gi)holpan	(gi)brokan	(gi)sprekan	(gi)faran	(gi)waldan	(gi)dōmid	(gi)mahlod	(gi)sagd

==== Strong verbs ====
Strong verbs use the Germanic form of conjugation known as ablaut. In this form of conjugation, the stem of the word changes to indicate the tense. Verbs like this persist in modern English; for example sing, sang, sung is a strong verb, as is swim, swam, swum and choose, chose, chosen. The root portion of the word changes rather than its ending. In Old English, there were seven major classes of a strong verb; each class has its own pattern of stem changes. Learning these is often a challenge for students of the language, though English speakers may see connections between the old verb classes and their modern forms.

The classes had the following distinguishing features to their infinitive stems:

1. ī + one consonant.
2. io or ū + one consonant.
3. e or i + two consonants.
4. e + 1 consonant (usually l or r, plus the verb brekan 'to break').
5. e + 1 consonant (usually a stop or a fricative).
6. a + 1 consonant.
7. Other than the above. Always a heavy root syllable (either a long vowel or short + two consonants), almost always a non-umlauted vowel – e.g. ō, ā, ē, a. Infinitive is distinguishable from class 1 weak verbs by non-umlauted root vowel; from class 1 weak verbs by lack of suffix -ian and from class 2 weak verbs by lack of suffix -ōn. First and second preterite have identical stems, usually in io (occ. ē), and the infinitive and the past participle also have the same stem.

Stem changes in strong verbs
Class	Root weight	Infinitive	First preterite	Second preterite	Past participle
I	heavy	ī	ē	i
II	heavy	io or ū	ō	u	o
III	heavy	e or i	a	u	o or u
IV	light	e(+r/l)	a	ā	o
V	light	e(+other)	a	ā	e
VI	light	a	ō		a
VII	heavy	ō, ā, ē, a	ē or io		same as infinitive

The first preterite stem is used in the preterite, for the first- and third-person singular. The second preterite stem is used for second-person singular, and all persons in the plural (as well as the preterite subjunctive). Strong verbs also exhibit i-mutation of the stem in the second- and third-person singular in the present tense, and sometimes in the first person as well (especially class II, III, IV and V verbs).

Regular strong verbs were all conjugated roughly the same, with the main differences being in the stem vowel. Thus stelan 'to steal' represents the strong verb conjugation paradigm.

Conjugation	Pronoun	'steal'
Infinitives		stelan
Infinitives		tō/te stelanne
Present indicative	ik	stilu
Present indicative	thū	stilis
Present indicative	hē/it/siu	stilid
Present indicative	wī/gī/sia	stelad
Past indicative	ik/hē/it/siu	stal
Past indicative	thū	stāli
Past indicative	wī/gī/sia	stālun
Present subjunctive	ik/hē/it/siu	stele
Present subjunctive	thū	steles
Present subjunctive	wī/gī/sia	stelen
Past subjunctive	ik/hē/it/siu	stāli
Past subjunctive	thū	stālis
Past subjunctive	wī/gī/sia	stālin
Imperative	Singular	stel
Imperative	Plural	stelad
Present participle		stelandi
Past participle		(gi)stolan

==== Weak verbs ====
The past and past-participle forms of weak verbs are formed with a (t or d) added to the end of the stem. Some modern English examples of this are love, loved or look, looked.

Originally, the weak ending was used to form the preterite of informal, noun-derived verbs such as often emerge in conversation and which have no established system of stem-change. By nature, these verbs were almost always transitive, and even today, most weak verbs are transitive verbs formed in the same way. The same process is found in Old English, and throughout the history of the English language. As English came into contact with non-Germanic languages, it invariably borrowed useful verbs which lacked established stem-change patterns. Rather than inventing and standardizing new classes or learning foreign conjugations, English speakers simply applied the weak ending to the foreign bases. The same process also happened with Dutch, German and occurs in modern Germanic languages.

There are three major classes of weak verbs in Old Saxon. The two first classes are recognizable as all their infinitives have the same ending -ian (1st class) and -ōn/-oian (2nd class). There is also a third class explained below, also ending with -ian.

Class-one verbs with short roots exhibit gemination of the final stem consonant in certain forms. Geminated ⟨f⟩ appears as ⟨bb⟩, and that of ⟨g⟩ appears as ⟨gg⟩.

Class-two verbs are recognizable in having an o-theme throughout the whole conjugation.

The following table shows the conjugation of three verbs: swebbian, "to put to sleep" is a class-one verb exhibiting gemination and an epenthetic vowel; dēlian "to share, deal" is a class-one verb exhibiting neither gemination nor an epenthetic vowel; galpon 'to cry' is a class-two verb.

Conjugation	Pronoun	'put to sleep'	'deal'	'journey'
Infinitives		swebbian	dēlian	galpon
Infinitives		tō/te swebbianne	tō/te dēlianne	tō/te galponne
Present indicative	ik	swebbiu	dēliu	galpo(n)
Present indicative	thū	sweƀis	dēlis	galpos
Present indicative	hē/it/siu	sweƀid	dēlid	galpod
Present indicative	wī/gī/sia	swebbiad	dēliad	galpiod
Past indicative	ik/hē/it/siu	sweƀida	dēlda	galpoda
Past indicative	thū	sweƀides	dēldes	galpodes
Past indicative	wī/gī/sia	sweƀidun	dēldun	galpodun
Present subjunctive	ik/hē/it/siu	swebbie	dēlie	galpo
Present subjunctive	thū	swebbies	dēlies	galpos
Present subjunctive	wī/gī/sia	swebbien	dēlien	galpion
Past subjunctive	ik/hē/it/siu	sweƀidi	dēldi	galpodi
Past subjunctive	thū	sweƀidis	dēldis	galpodis
Past subjunctive	wī/gī/sia	sweƀidin	dēldin	galpodin
Imperative	Singular	sweƀi	dēli	galpo
Imperative	Plural	swebbiad	dēliad	galpiod
Present participle		swebbiandi	dēliandi	galpondi
Past participle		(gi)sweƀid	(gi)dēlid	(gi)galpod

==== Preterite-present verbs ====
The preterite-present verbs are a class of verbs which have a present tense in the form of a strong preterite and a past tense like the past of a weak verb. These verbs derive from the subjunctive or optative use of preterite forms to refer to present or future time. For example, witan, "to know" comes from a verb which originally meant "to have seen". The present singular is formed from the original singular preterite stem and the present plural from the original plural preterite stem. As a result of this history, the first-person singular and third-person singular are the same in the present.

Few preterite present appear in the Old Saxon corpus, and some are not attested in all forms.

Conjugation	Pronoun	'know how to'	'be able to'	'be obliged'	'to know'	'own'	'to avail'	'dare to do'	'to remember'	'to need'	'be allowed'	'allow'	'have use of'
Infinitives		kunnan	mugan	skulan	witan	ēgan	dugan	*(gi-)durran	far-munan	thurƀan	mōtan	gi-unnan	*gi-nugan
Present Indicative	ik/hē/it/siu	kan	mag, mah	skal	wēt	ēh	dōg, dōh	gidar	far-man	tharf	mōt	gi-an	ginah
Present Indicative	thū	kanst	maht	skalt	wēst	ēhst	*dōht	*(gi)darst	far-manst	tharft	mōst	gi-anst	*ginaht
Present Indicative	wī/gī/sia	kunnun	mugun	skulun	witun	ēgun	dugun	(gi)durrun	*far-munun	thurƀun	mōtun	*gi-unnun	*ginugun
Past Indicative	ik/hē/it/siu	konsta	mohta	skolda	wissa	ēhta	dohta	(gi)dorsta	far-monsta	thorfta	mōsta	gi-onsta	*ginohta
Past Indicative	thū	konstes	mohtes	skoldes	wisses	ēhtes	*dohtes	*(gi)dorstes	*far-monstes	thorftes	mōstes	*gi-onstes	*ginohtes
Past Indicative	wī/gī/sia	konstun	mohtun	skoldun	wissun	ēhtun	*dohtun	(gi)dorstun	far-monstun	thorftun	mōstun	*gi-onstun	*ginohtun
Present subjunctive	ik/hē/it/siu	kunni	mugi	skuli	witi	ēgi	dugi	*(gi)durri	far-muni	thurƀi	mōti	*gi-unni	*ginugi
Present subjunctive	thū	kunnis	mugis	skulis	witis	ēgis	*dugis	*(gi)durris	*far-munis	thurƀis	mōtis	*gi-unnis	*ginugis
Present subjunctive	wī/gī/sia	kunnin	mugin	skulin	witin	ēgin	*dugin	*(gi)durrin	far-munin	thurƀin	mōtin	*gi-unnin	*ginugin
ik/hē/it/siu	Past subjunctive	konsti	mohti	skoldi	wissi	ēhti	*dohti	gidorsti	far-monsti	thorfti	mōsti	*gi-onsti	*ginohti
thū	Past subjunctive	konstis	mohtis	skoldis	wissis	ēhtis	*dohtis	*(gi)dorstis	*far-monstis	thorftis	mōstis	*gi-onstis	*ginohtis
wī/gī/sia	Past subjunctive	konstin	mohtin	skoldin	wissin	ēhtin	*dohtin	gidorstin	*far-monstin	thorftin	mōstin	*gi-onstin	*ginohtin

[Forms above with asterisk (*) unattested]

==== Anomalous verbs ====
Additionally, there is a further group of five verbs which are anomalous:

- dōn (to do)
- gān (to go)
- stān (to stand)
- wesan/sīn (to be)
- willian (to want)

These five have their own conjugation schemes which differ significantly from all the other classes of verb. This is not especially unusual: "want", "do", "go", and "be" are the most commonly used verbs in the language, and are very important to the meaning of the sentences in which they are used. Idiosyncratic patterns of inflection are much more common with important items of vocabulary than with rarely used ones.

The verbs dōn 'to do', stān 'to stand' and gān 'to go' are conjugated alike; willian 'to want' is similar outside of the present tense.

Conjugation	Pronoun	'do'	'go'	'stand'	'will'
Infinitive	–	dōn	gān	stān	willian
Present indicative	ik	dōm	gā	*stā	williu
Present indicative	thū	dēs	gēs	stēs	wilt, wilis
Present indicative	hē/it/siu	dēd	gēd	stēd	wili
Present indicative	wī/gī/sia	dōd	gād	stād	williad
Past indicative	ik/hē/it/siu	deda	geng	stōd	welda
Past indicative	thū	dedes	gengi	stōdi	weldes
Past indicative	wī/gī/sia	dedun	gengun	stōdun	weldun
Present subjunctive	ik/hē/it/siu	dō(e)	gā(e)	stā(e)	willie
Present subjunctive	thū	dō(e)s	gā(e)s	stā(e)s	willies
Present subjunctive	wī/gī/sia	dō(e)n	gā(e)n	stā(e)n	willien
Past subjunctive	ik/hē/it/siu	dedi	gengi	stōdi	weldi
Past subjunctive	thū	dedis	gengis	stōdis	weldis
Past subjunctive	wī/gī/sia	dedin	gengin	stōdin	weldin
Present participle		dōndi	gānde	stānde	willende
Past participle		gidān	gigangan	gistandan	—

The verb 'to be' is actually composed of three different stems:

Conjugation	Pronoun	s-stem	b-stem	w-stem
Infinitive	–	sīn	*bion?	wesan
Present indicative	ik	*eom	bium	wisu
Present indicative	thū	*art	bis(t)	wisis
Present indicative	hē/it/siu	is(t)	*bid	wis(id)
Present indicative	wī/gī/sia	sind(un)	*biod	wesad
Past indicative	ik	–	–	was
Past indicative	thū	–	–	wāri
Past indicative	hē/it/siu	–	–	was
Past indicative	wī/gī/sia	–	–	wārun
Present subjunctive	ik/thū/hē/it/siu	sī(e)	–	wese
Present subjunctive	wī/gī/sia	sī(e)n	–	wesen
Past subjunctive	ik/thū/hē/it/siu	–	–	wāri
Past subjunctive	wī/gī/sia	–	–	wārin
Imperative	(singular)	–	–	wis, wes
Imperative	(plural)	–	–	wesad
Present participle		–	–	wesandi
Past participle		–	–	(gi)wesan

The present forms of wesan are almost never used. Therefore, wesan is used as the past, imperative, and present participle versions of sīn, and does not have a separate meaning. The b-stem is only met in the present indicative of wesan, and only for the 1st and 2nd persons in the singular.

=== Nouns ===
Old Saxon is an inflected language, and as such its nouns, pronouns, adjectives and determiners must be declined in order to serve a grammatical function. A set of declined forms of the same word pattern is called a declension. As in several other ancient Germanic languages, there are five major cases: nominative, accusative, dative, genitive and instrumental.

- The Nominative case indicated the subject of the sentence, for example: thē kuning means 'the king'. It was also used for direct address. Adjectives in the predicate (qualifying a noun on the other side of 'to be') were also in the nominative.
- The Accusative case indicated the direct object of the sentence, for example: Adam gisah thena kuning means "Adam saw the king", where Adam is the subject and the king (here God) is the object. Already the accusative had begun to merge with the nominative; it was never distinguished in the plural, or in a neuter noun.
- The Genitive case indicated possession. For example: thes kuninges word means "the word of the king" or "the king's word". It also indicated partitive nouns.
- The Dative case indicated the indirect object of the sentence; To/for whom the object was meant. For example: Hē gaf is brōd thēmu kuninge means "he gave his bread to the king". Here, the word kuning is its dative form: kuninge. There were also several verbs that took direct objects in the dative.
- The Instrumental case indicated an instrument used to achieve something, for example: he warð swerde gikwelid, "he was killed by the sword", where swerde is the instrumental form of swerd. During the Old Saxon period, the instrumental was falling out of use, having largely merged with the dative. Only pronouns and strong adjectives retained separate forms for the instrumental.

In addition to inflection for case, nouns take different endings depending on whether the noun was in the singular (for example, berg 'one mountain') or plural (for example, bergos 'many mountains'). Also, some nouns pluralize by way of Umlaut, and some undergo no pluralizing change in certain cases.

Nouns are also categorized by grammatical gender – masculine, feminine, or neuter. In general, masculine and neuter words share their endings. Feminine words have their own subset of endings. The plural of some declension types distinguishes between genders, e.g., a-stem masculine nominative plural stēnos "stones" vs. neuter nominative plural skipu "ships" and word "words".

Furthermore, Old Saxon nouns are divided as either strong or weak. Weak nouns have their own endings. In general, weak nouns are easier than strong nouns, since they had begun to lose their declensional system. However, there is a great deal of overlap between the various classes of noun: they are not totally distinct from one another.

Old Saxon language grammars often follow the common NOM-ACC-GEN-DAT-INST order used for the Germanic languages.

==== Strong nouns ====
Here are the strong a-stem declensional endings and examples for each gender:

The Strong Noun Declension
Case	Masculine		Neuter		Feminine
Case	Singular	Plural	Singular	Plural	Singular	Plural
Nominative−Accusative	dag	dagos	–	-u/–	-a	-a
Genitive	dages	dago	-es	-a	-o	-ono
Dative	dage	dagum/un	-e	-um/un	-u	-um/un

For the '-u/–' neuter forms above, the '-u' is used with a root consisting of a single short syllable such as bak ('back'), skip ('ship') or fat ('vat'). The feminine nominative -a is due to analogy with the accusative.

Here are the strong ja-stem declensional endings and examples for each gender:

The Strong Noun Declension
Case	Masculine		Neuter		Feminine
Case	Singular	Plural	Singular	Plural	Singular	Plural
Nominative−Accusative	-i	-ios	-i	-i	-ia	-ia
Genitive	-ies	-io	-ies	-o	-io	-iono
Dative	-ie	-ium/iun	-ie	-ium/iun	-iu	-ium/iun

Here is the i-stem declension. We will be using examples to display mutations:

The Strong Noun Declension
Case	Masculine		Feminine
Case	Singular	Plural	Singular	Plural
Nominative−Accusative	gast	gesti	anst	ensti
Genitive	gastes	gestio	ensti	enstio
Dative	gaste	gestium	ensti	enstium

Here is the u-stem declension. We will be using examples to display mutations:

The Strong Noun Declension
Case	Masculine		Neuter
Case	Singular	Plural	Singular	Plural
Nominative−Accusative	sunu	suni(os)	fehu	?
Genitive	sunu/ies	sunio	fehes	?
Dative	sunu/i.e.	sunium	fehe	*fehum?

== Syntax ==
Old Saxon syntax is mostly different from that of English. Some were simply consequences of the greater level of nominal and verbal inflection – e.g., word order was generally freer. In addition:

- The default word order demanded that the second verb in a sentence be placed in the end of said sentence, such as that of modern Dutch or modern German.
- There was no do-support in questions and negatives.
- Multiple negatives could stack up in a sentence, and intensify each other (negative concord), which is not always the case in modern English nor modern Dutch nor modern German.
- Sentences with subordinate clauses of the type "when X, Y" (e.g. "When I got home, I ate dinner") did not use a wh-type conjunction, but rather used a th-type correlative conjunction (e.g. thô X, thô Y in place of "when X, Y"). The wh-type conjunctions were used only as interrogative pronouns and indefinite pronouns.
- Similarly, wh- forms were not used as relative pronouns (as in "the man who saw me" or "the car that I bought"). Instead, an indeclinable word the was used, often in conjunction with the definite article (which was declined for case, number and gender).
