= Old English grammar =

Grammatical features of Old English

The grammar of Old English differs greatly from Modern English, predominantly being much more inflected. As a Germanic language, Old English has a morphological system similar to that of the Proto-Germanic reconstruction, retaining many of the inflections thought to have been common in Proto-Indo-European and also including constructions characteristic of the Germanic daughter languages such as the umlaut.

Among living languages, Old English morphology most closely resembles that of modern Icelandic, which is among the most conservative of the Germanic languages. To a lesser extent, it resembles modern German.

Nouns, pronouns, adjectives and determiners were fully inflected, with four grammatical cases (nominative, accusative, genitive, dative), and a vestigial instrumental, two grammatical numbers (singular and plural) and three grammatical genders (masculine, feminine, and neuter). First and second-person personal pronouns also had dual forms for referring to groups of two people, in addition to the usual singular and plural forms. The instrumental case was somewhat rare and occurred only in the masculine and neuter singular. It was often replaced by the dative. Adjectives, pronouns and (sometimes) participles agreed with their corresponding nouns in case, number and gender. Finite verbs agreed with their subjects in person and number.

Nouns came in numerous declensions (with many parallels in Latin, Ancient Greek and Sanskrit). Verbs were classified into ten primary conjugation classes seven strong and three weak each with numerous subtypes, alongside several smaller conjugation groups and a few irregular verbs. The main difference from other ancient Indo-European languages, such as Latin, is that verbs could be conjugated in only two tenses (compared to the six "tenses", really tense/aspect combinations, of Latin), and the absence of a synthetic passive voice, which still existed in Gothic.

== Nouns ==
Old English nouns are grouped by grammatical gender, and inflect based on case and number.

=== Gender ===
Old English retains all three genders of Proto-Indo-European: masculine, feminine, and neuter.

Each noun belongs to one of the three genders, while adjectives and determiners take different forms depending on the gender of the noun they describe. The word for "the" or "that" is sē with a masculine noun, sēo with a feminine noun, and þæt (which sounds like “that”) with a neuter noun. Adjectives change endings: for instance, since hring ("ring") is masculine and cuppe ("cup") is feminine, a golden ring is gylden hring, while a golden cup is gyldenu cuppe.

In Old English the words for "he" (hē) and "she" (hēo) also mean "it". Hē refers back to masculine nouns, hēo to feminine nouns, reserving the neuter pronoun hit for grammatically neuter nouns. That means even inanimate objects are frequently called "he" or "she". See the following sentence, with the masculine noun snāw:

| Old English | Mē līcaþ sē snāw for þon þe hē dēþ þā burg stille. |
| Literal gloss | Me liketh the snow for that he doth the borough still. |
| Translation | I like the snow because it makes the city quiet. |

Compare this parallel sentence, where the neuter noun fȳr (OE equivalent of NE fire) is referred to with hit (OE equivalent of neuter singular nominative NE it):

| Old English | Mē līcaþ þæt fȳr for þon þe hit dēþ þā burg hlūde. |
| Translation | I like the fire because it makes the city loud. |

Only a few nouns referring to people have a grammatical gender that does not match their natural gender, as in the neuter word mæġden ("girl"). In such cases, adjectives and determiners follow grammatical gender, but pronouns follow natural gender: Þæt mæġden sēo þǣr stent, canst þū hīe? ("The [neuter] girl who [feminine] is standing there, do you know her?").

When two nouns have different genders, adjectives and determiners that refer to them together are inflected neuter: Hlīsa and spēd bēoþ twieċġu ("Fame [masculine] and success [feminine] are double-edged [neuter plural]").

==== Gender assignment ====
In Old English (and Indo-European languages generally), each noun's gender derives from morphophonology rather than directly from semantics. In other words, the gender of a noun derives as much or more from its structural form than any properties of the referent.

The gender of a given Old English noun is partly predictable, based on a combination of semantic and historical morphophonological grounds. What follows are some general principles in assigning noun gender in Old English.

In general, a thing that has biological sex will have that same gender; masculine fæder ("father") and feminine mōdor ("mother"), masculine cyning ("king") and feminine cwēn ("queen"), masculine munuc ("monk") and feminine nunne ("nun"), etc. The three major exceptions are neuter wīf ("woman", "wife") and neuter mæġden ("girl"), and masculine wīfmann ("woman"). The gender of mæġden can be explained by its diminutive suffix, as in German Mädchen and Dutch meisje, while wīfmann is a compound whose final element mann is masculine. This leaves wīf as the clearest major anomaly, being grammatically neuter despite referring specifically to a female person with no obvious structural explanation for its gender.

Animal names that refer only to males are masculine (e.g. hana "rooster", henġest "stallion", eofor "boar", fearr "bull", ramm "ram", and bucc "buck"), and animal names that refer only to females are feminine (e.g. henn "hen", mīere "mare", sugu "sow", cū "cow", eowu "ewe", and dā "doe"). The only exception is drān ("drone"), which is feminine even though it refers to male bees. This places it in an extremely small list, along with wīf.

General names for animals (of unspecified sex) could be of any gender: for example, ūr ("aurochs") is masculine, fifalde ("butterfly") is feminine, and swīn ("pig") is neuter.

If a noun could refer to both males and females, it was usually masculine. Hence frēond ("friend") and fēond ("enemy", "fiend") were masculine, along with many other examples such as lufiend ("lover"), bæcere ("baker"), hālga ("saint"), sċop ("poet"), cuma ("guest", "comer"), mǣġ ("relative"), cristen ("Christian"), hǣðen ("heathen"), āngenġa ("loner"), selfǣta ("cannibal", "self-eater"), hlēapere ("dancer", "leaper"), and sangere ("singer"). The main exceptions are the two words for "child", ċild and bearn, which are both neuter, although words referring to young beings are often neuter, unless they refer to a young being of a specific sex, as is the case in modern German.

It is not easy to predict the gender of a noun that refers to a thing without biological sex, such as neuter seax ("knife"), feminine gafol ("fork"), and masculine cucler ("spoon"). The gender of nouns with inanimate referents is usually determined by historical morphophonological principles:

- Nouns ending in -a are almost all masculine. The exceptions are a small number of learned borrowings from Latin, such as Italia ("Italy") and discipula ("[female] disciple").
- Compound words always take the gender of their final element, which is the grammatical head of the compound. Thus wīfmann ("woman") is masculine because mann ("person") is masculine, even though the compound refers to a female person.
- Similarly, if a noun ends in a suffix, the suffix determines its gender. Nouns ending in the suffixes -oþ, -dōm, -end, -els, -uc, -ling, -ere, -hād, and -sċipe are all masculine, nouns ending in -ung, -þu, -nes, -estre, -rǣden, and -wist are all feminine, and nouns ending in -lāc, -et, -ærn, and -ċen are all neuter. Mæġden ("girl") is neuter because it ends in the neuter diminutive suffix -en.
- Letters of the alphabet are all masculine.
- Metals are all neuter.
- Adjectives used as nouns, such as colors, are neuter unless they refer to people. When they do refer to people, they are masculine by default unless the person is known to be a female, in which case they duly follow the feminine inflections: fremde ("stranger"), fremdu ("[female] stranger"); dēadlīċ ("mortal"), dēadlīcu ("[female] mortal").
- Verbs are neuter when used as nouns.

Since gender is noun-specific and ultimately a feature of morphophonology rather than semantics (word-meaning), it goes without saying that any "thing" (referent) might be referred to as a different name (noun) of a different gender: a "mountain" could be denoted by the masculine beorg or feminine dūn, a "star" could be denoted by masculine steorra or neuter tungol, a "window" could be denoted by neuter ēagþȳrel or feminine ēagduru, a "tree" could be denoted by neuter trēo ("tree") or masculine bēam, a "shield wall" denoted by masculine sċieldweall or feminine sċieldburg.

==== Feminizing suffixes ====
Old English has two nouns for many types of people: a general term which can refer to both males and females, like Modern English "waiter", and a separate term which refers only to females, like Modern English "waitress". Several different suffixes are used to specify females:

- -en is added to miscellaneous words such as god ("god") → gyden ("goddess"), ielf ("elf") → ielfen ("female elf"), þeġn ("servant") → þiġnen ("female servant"), þēow ("slave") → þiewen ("female slave"), and nēahġebūr ("neighbor") → nēahġebȳren ("female neighbor").
- -estre is the female equivalent of -ere and -end, both meaning "-er". It is used on many nouns such as sangere ("singer") → sangestre ("female singer"), lufiend ("lover") → lufestre ("female lover"), bæcere ("baker") → bæcestre, tæppere ("bartender") → tæppestre, and forspennend ("pimp") → forspennestre.
- -e is the female equivalent of -a, which was sometimes a regular noun ending with no meaning and sometimes yet another suffix meaning "-er". Examples include wyrhta ("worker") → wyrhte and foregenġa ("predecessor") → foregenġe.

Sometimes the female equivalent is a totally separate word, as in lārēow ("teacher") ~ lǣrestre ("female teacher", as if the general term were *lǣrere), lǣċe ("doctor") ~ lācnestre ("female doctor", as if the general term were *lācnere), and hlāford ("master", literally "bread guardian") ~ hlǣfdiġe ("mistress", literally "bread kneader").

=== Case ===
As in several other old Germanic languages, Old English declensions include five cases: nominative, accusative, dative, genitive, and instrumental.

- Nominative: the subject of a sentence, which carries out the action. Hē lufode hīe ("he loved her"), þæt mæġden rann ("the girl ran"). Words on the other side of "to be" also take this case: in the phrase wyrd is eall ("destiny is all"), both "destiny" and "all" are nominative.
- Accusative: the direct object, that which is acted upon. Hē lufode hīe ("he loved her"), sē ridda ācwealde þone dracan ("the knight slew the dragon").
- Genitive: the possessor of something. Ġesāwe þū þæs hundes bān? ("Have you seen the dog's bone?"). The genitive in Old English corresponds to 's in present-day English and to "of" in present-day English. Hence, "The fall of Rome" was Rōme hryre, literally "Rome's fall", and "the god of thunder" was þunres god, literally "thunder's god". Old English has the preposition "of" but the genitive was the main way of indicating possession. The genitive case could be used partitively, to signify that something was composed of something else: "a group of people" was manna hēap (literally "people's group"), "three of us" was ūre þrī ("our three"), and "a cup of water" was wætres cuppe ("water's cup").
- Dative: the indirect object. Iċ sealde hire þone beall ("I gave her the ball").
- Instrumental: something that is being used. Hwæl mē meahte mid āne sleġe besenċan oþþe ofslēan ("A whale could sink or kill me with one blow"). This case can be used without prepositions when the meaning is clear, as in ōðre naman, which means "[by] another name": Ūhtred sē Godlēasa æt Bebban byrġ, ōðre naman sē Deneslaga ("Uhtred the Godless of Bebbanburg, also known as the Daneslayer"). During the Old English period, the instrumental was falling out of use, having mostly merged with the dative. It was distinguished from the dative only in the masculine and neuter singular of strong adjectives and demonstratives, and even then the dative was often used instead.

=== Noun classes ===
Not all nouns take the same endings to inflect for number and case. Instead, each noun belongs to one of eight different classes, and each class has a different set of endings (sometimes several, depending on subtype).

In Proto-Germanic, one could tell which class a noun was by its ending in the nominative singular. But by the Old English period, most of these endings had disappeared or merged with other endings, so this was no longer possible.

==== a-stems ====
A-stem nouns are by far the largest class, totaling 60% of all nouns. Some are masculine, some are neuter. They are called a-stems because in Proto-Germanic times, they ended in -az (if masculine) or -ą (if neuter). However, in Old English, both these endings have vanished, and masculines only differ from neuters in the nominative/accusative plural.

Masculine a-stems are almost all inflected the same, as in hund ("dog") below. The neuter a-stems, however, are split in two: some of them end in -u in the nominative/accusative plural, while others have no ending there at all. This was caused by a sound change called high vowel apocope, which occurred in the prehistory of Old English. Short -i and -u disappeared at the ends of words after a heavy syllable—that is, a syllable containing a long vowel or long diphthong or ending in two or more consonants—and after two light syllables. Nouns which kept short -i/-u are called light, while nouns which lost them are called heavy.

The a-stems come in three separate declensions: one for masculine nouns, one for "heavy" neuter nouns, and one for "light" neuter nouns. They are exemplified by hund ("dog"), sċip ("boat"), and hūs ("house"):

a-stem declension
| Case | Masculine hund « dog » | | Neuter | | | |
| Case | Masculine hund « dog » | | Light sċip « boat » | | Heavy hūs « house » | |
| Case | Singular | Plural | Singular | Plural | Singular | Plural |
|---|---|---|---|---|---|---|
| Nominative−Accusative | hund | hundas | sċip | sċipu | hūs | hūs |
| Genitive | hundes | hunda | sċipes | sċipa | hūses | hūsa |
| Dative | hunde | hundum | sċipe | sċipum | hūse | hūsum |

==== ō-stems ====
The ō-stems are by far the largest class after a-stems. They include the vast majority of feminine nouns, and zero nouns with Null morphemes of any other gender.

They are called ō-stems because they ended in -ō in Proto-Germanic, but in Old English that ending has changed to -u or vanished. In the nominative singular, "light" ō-stems end in -u while "heavy" ō-stems have no ending, just like neuter a-stems in the nominative/accusative plural.

ō-stem declension
| Case | Light ġiefu « gift » | | Heavy rād « ride » | |
| Case | Singular | Plural | Singular | Plural |
|---|---|---|---|---|
| Nominative | ġiefu | ġiefa | rād | rāda |
| Accusative | ġiefe | ġiefa, -e | rāde | rāda, -e |
| Genitive | ġiefe | ġiefa | rāde | rāda |
| Dative | ġiefe | ġiefum | rāde | rādum |

==== n-stems ====
N-stems can be any gender, though there are only a few neuters: ēage ("eye"), ēare ("ear"), wange ("cheek"), and compounds ending in them, such as þunwange ("temple [of the head]"). N-stems are also called "weak nouns", because they are "weakly" inflected; i.e., most of their inflections have the same ending, -an. All other nouns are called "strong nouns".

Masculine and feminine n-stems are inflected the same except in the nominative singular, where masculines end in -a, feminines in -e:

n-stem declension
| Case | Masculine mōna « moon » | | Feminine sunne « sun » | |
| Case | Singular | Plural | Singular | Plural |
|---|---|---|---|---|
| Nominative | mōna | mōnan | sunne | sunnan |
| Accusative | mōnan | mōnan | sunnan | sunnan |
| Genitive | mōnan | mōnena | sunnan | sunnena |
| Dative | mōnan | mōnum | sunnan | sunnum |

The few neuter n-stems are declined the same as feminines, except they also have -e in the accusative singular:

n-stem declension
Neuter ēage « eye »
| Case | Singular | Plural |
|---|---|---|
| Nominative−Accusative | ēage | ēagan |
| Genitive | ēagan | ēagena |
| Dative | ēagan | ēagum |

==== i-stems ====
The i-stems are so called because they ended in -iz in Proto-Germanic, but in Old English that ending has either become -e (in light i-stems) or vanished (in heavy i-stems). These nouns come in every gender, though neuter i-stems are rare.

By the earliest Old English prose, this class has already largely merged with other classes: masculine and neuter i-stems have taken on the same declension as a-stems, and feminine i-stems have almost the same declension as ō-stems. So, they are really only called i-stems because of their history, not because of how they inflect.

Their only distinct inflection survives in the accusative singular of feminine heavy i-stems, which fluctuates between -e (the ō-stem ending) and no ending (the inherited ending):

tīd « time »
| Case | Singular | Plural |
|---|---|---|
| Nominative | tīd | tīda |
| Accusative | tīd, tīde | tīda, -e |
| Genitive | tīde | tīda |
| Dative | tīde | tīdum |

The exceptions are a few nouns that only come in the plural, namely lēode ("people") and various names of nationalities, such as Engle ("the English") and Dene ("the Danes"). These nouns kept the nominative/accusative plural -e that they inherited through regular sound change.

| Case | Engle « the English » |
|---|---|
| Nominative−Accusative | Engle |
| Genitive | Engla |
| Dative | Englum |

==== u-stems ====
The u-stems are all masculine or feminine. They are all declined the same way, regardless of gender:

u-stem declension
| Case | Light sunu « son » | | Heavy hand « hand » | |
| Case | Singular | Plural | Singular | Plural |
|---|---|---|---|---|
| Nominative−Accusative | sunu | suna | hand | handa |
| Genitive | suna | suna | handa | handa |
| Dative | suna | sunum | handa | handum |

There are few pure u-stem nouns, but some are very common: duru ("door"), medu ("mead"), wudu ("wood"). Most historical u-stems have been transferred over to the a-stems. Some nouns follow the a-stem inflection overall, but have a few leftover u-stem forms in their inflection. These forms may exist alongside regular a-stem forms:

- feld: dative singular felda
- ford: dative singular forda
- winter: dative singular wintra
- æppel: nominative/accusative plural æppla

==== Root nouns ====
Root nouns are a small class of nouns which, in Proto-Germanic, had ended in a consonant without any intervening vowel.

These nouns undergo i-umlaut in the dative singular and the nominative/accusative plural. This is the source of nouns in Modern English which form their plural by changing a vowel, as in man ~ men, foot ~ feet, tooth ~ teeth, mouse ~ mice, goose ~ geese, and louse ~ lice. In Old English, there were many more such words, including bōc ("book"), cū ("cow"), gāt ("goat"), āc ("oak"), hnutu ("nut"), burg ("city"), and sulh ("plow").

All root nouns are either masculine or feminine. Masculine root nouns are all heavy, but among feminines there is a contrast between light nouns and heavy nouns: light nouns end in -e where they have umlaut of the root vowel, while heavy nouns have no ending. The typical declension is this:

root noun declension
| Case | Masculine mann « person » | | Feminine | | | |
| Case | Masculine mann « person » | | Light hnutu « nut » | | Heavy gōs « goose » | |
| Case | Singular | Plural | Singular | Plural | Singular | Plural |
|---|---|---|---|---|---|---|
| Nominative−Accusative | mann | menn | hnutu | hnyte | gōs | gēs |
| Genitive | mannes | manna | hnute | hnuta | gōse | gōsa |
| Dative | menn | mannum | hnyte | hnutum | gēs | gōsum |

==== nd-stems ====
Nd-stems are nouns formed with the suffix -end, which creates agent nouns from verbs: āgan ("to own") → āgend ("owner"). All are masculine.

Single-syllable nd-stems are only possible when the stem ends in a vowel, which is rare; hence, only three are attested: frēond ("friend") ← frēoġan ("to love"), fēond ("enemy") ← fēoġan ("to hate"), and tēond ("accuser") ← tēon ("to accuse"). They are declined just like masculine root nouns:

nd-stem declension (one-syllable)
frēond « friend »
| Case | Singular | Plural |
|---|---|---|
| Nominative−Accusative | frēond | frīend |
| Genitive | frēondes | frēonda |
| Dative | frīend | frēondum |

The multi-syllable nd-stems are declined very differently. Their stem vowel never undergoes i-umlaut, and in fact, they are inflected just like a-stems in the singular. Moreover, their plural forms are truly unique: the genitive plural always ends in -ra, which is normally used for adjectives, and the nominative/accusative plural varies between no ending, the adjective ending -e, and the a-stem ending -as. The adjectival endings are a relic of the nd-stems' origin as present participles.

nd-stem declension (multi-syllable)
ymbstandend « bystander »
| Case | Singular | Plural |
|---|---|---|
| Nominative−Accusative | ymbstandend | ymbstandend, -e, -as |
| Genitive | ymbstandendes | ymbstandendra |
| Dative | ymbstandende | ymbstandendum |

==== r-stems ====
The r-stems comprise only five nouns: fæder, mōdor, brōþor, sweostor, and dohtor.

Brōþor, mōdor, and dohtor are all inflected the same, with i-umlaut in the dative singular. Sweostor is inflected the same except without i-umlaut. Fæder is indeclinable in the singular like sweostor, but has taken its nominative/accusative plural from the a-stems. In addition, brōþor and sweostor often take the prefix ġe- in the plural, while the rest never do.

r-stem declension
| Case | fæder | | mōdor | | brōþor | | sweostor | | dohtor | |
| Case | Singular | Plural | Singular | Plural | Singular | Plural | Singular | Plural | Singular | Plural |
|---|---|---|---|---|---|---|---|---|---|---|
| Nominative−Accusative | fæder | fæderas | mōdor | mōdru, -a | brōþor | (ġe)brōþor, -ru, -ra | sweostor | (ġe)sweostor, -ru, -ra | dohtor | dohtor, -ru, -ra |
| Genitive | fæder | fædera | mōdor | mōdra | brōþor | (ġe)brōþra | sweostor | (ġe)sweostra | dohtor | dohtra |
| Dative | fæder | fæderum | mēder | mōdrum | brēþer | (ġe)brōþrum | sweostor | (ġe)sweostrum | dehter | dohtrum |

==== z-stems ====
Z-stems are the name given to four neuter nouns which inflect like light neuter a-stems, except the plural endings begin with -r-. These nouns are ċild ("child"), ǣġ ("egg"), lamb ("lamb"), and ċealf ("calf").

z-stem declension
lamb
| Case | Singular | Plural |
|---|---|---|
| Nominative−Accusative | lamb | lambru |
| Genitive | lambes | lambra |
| Dative | lambe | lambrum |

==== Irregularities ====
The above only mentions the most common ways each noun class is inflected. There are many variations even within classes, some of which include:

- High vowel apocope (loss of short -i and -u at the end of a word) is not entirely consistent. At first, these sounds were lost after a heavy syllable or two light syllables. But then, at some point before the written period, speakers started re-adding -u to the plurals of some neuter nouns where it had originally vanished. These nouns have two competing plurals, one with -u and one without it. So, "dreams" is either swefn or swefnu, "sails" is either seġl or seġlu, and "waters" is either wæter or wætru, among many other examples. Note that this mainly happened to a very specific set of nouns: those whose inflectional endings are preceded by a consonant plus /n/, /l/, or /r/.
- Some nouns have -u after a heavy syllable because, when high vowel apocope occurred, they had an intervening light syllable which later disappeared. Examples include nouns with the suffix -þu such as strengðu ("strength") and iermðu ("poverty"), z-stem plurals such as ǣġru ("eggs") and ċealfru ("calves"), and the a-stem plurals hēafdu ("heads") and dēoflu ("demons"). Also the plurals of all neuter a-stems that end in -e: wīte ("punishment"), pl. wītu; ǣrende ("message"), pl. ǣrendu.
- Some ō-stems unexpectedly end in -u in the singular, such as þīestru ("darkness"), hǣtu ("heat"), meniġu ("crowd"), ieldu ("age"), and bieldu ("bravery"). These nouns once belonged to a separate class called the īn-stems, which all ended in -ī. Then they merged with the ō-stems when this ending was replaced with -u—well after high vowel apocope had gone to completion, so the -u remained.
- Many nouns which end with an unstressed vowel plus a single consonant lose the unstressed vowel when they take inflectional endings: gristel ("cartilage"), gristles ("of cartilage"). However, it is impossible to predict which nouns this happens to without knowing the history of the word. For example, Dryhten ("the Lord") loses its unstressed -e- when inflected, but nīeten ("animal") does not; ēðel ("homeland") does, but crypel ("cripple") does not.
- If an a-stem ends in one consonant and its stem vowel is short /æ/, it becomes /ɑ/ in the plural. "Day" is dæġ but "days" is dagas, "bath" is bæþ but "baths" is baðu. Other examples include fæt ("container"), sċræf ("cave"), stæf ("staff"), pæþ ("path"), hwæl ("whale"), and blæd ("blade").
- A-stems which end in ġ, ċ, or sċ after a vowel have hard g, c, or sc in the plural: fisċ /fiʃ/ ("fish"), pl. fiscas /ˈfiskɑs/. Other examples include dæġ ("day"), weġ ("way"), twiġ ("twig"), disċ ("plate"), dīċ ("ditch"), līċ ("corpse"), and wīċ ("village").
- If a noun ends in h, the h disappears before inflectional endings. This lengthens the preceding vowel or diphthong (if it is short). Unless the h comes right after a consonant, it also deletes the following vowel, except in the genitive plural, where an -n- has been inserted to prevent this from happening. All this is exemplified by two masculine a-stems, sċōh and fearh:

nouns ending in h
| Case | sċōh « shoe » | | fearh « piglet » | |
| Case | Singular | Plural | Singular | Plural |
|---|---|---|---|---|
| Nominative−Accusative | sċōh | sċōs | fearh | fēaras |
| Genitive | sċōs | sċōna | fēares | fēara |
| Dative | sċō | sċōm | fēare | fēarum |

- If an a-stem ends in -u, the u is replaced with w before inflectional endings: searu ("machine"), dat. sg. searwe.
- Something similar happens with a subgroup of ō-stem nouns called the wō-stems. These nouns once ended in -wu, before a sound change occurred which caused the w to disappear in the nominative singular; subsequently some also lost the -u by high vowel apocope. By the written period, they are indistinguishable from other ō-stems in the nominative singular, except they keep the w before inflectional endings. These nouns include sċeadu ("shadow/shade"), sinu ("sinew"), mǣd ("meadow"), and lǣs ("pasture").

wō-stem declension
| Case | Light sċeadu « shadow » | | Heavy mǣd « meadow » | |
| Case | Singular | Plural | Singular | Plural |
|---|---|---|---|---|
| Nominative | sċeadu | sċeadwa | mǣd | mǣdwa |
| Accusative | sċeadwe | sċeadwa, -e | mǣdwe | mǣdwa, -e |
| Genitive | sċeadwe | sċeadwa | mǣdwe | mǣdwa |
| Dative | sċeadwe | sċeadwum | mǣdwe | mǣdwum |

== Adjectives ==
Adjectives take different endings depending on the case, gender, and number of the noun they describe. The adjective cwic ("alive"), for example, comes in eleven different forms: cwic, cwicu, cwicne, cwice, cwices, cwicre, cwicum, cwica, cwicra, cwican, and cwicena.

=== Strong and weak declension ===
There are two separate sets of inflections, traditionally called the "strong declension" and the "weak declension". Together, both declensions contain many different inflections, though just ten or eleven unique forms typically cover all of them. The usual endings are exhibited by cwic ("alive") among many other adjectives:

Strong declension of cwic
| Singular | Masculine | Neuter | Feminine |
|---|---|---|---|
| Nominative | cwic | cwic | cwicu |
| Accusative | cwicne | cwic | cwice |
| Genitive | cwices | | cwicre |
| Dative | cwicum | | cwicre |
| Instrumental | cwice | | cwicre |
| Plural | Masculine | Neuter | Feminine |
| Nominative | cwice | cwicu | cwica |
| Accusative | cwice | cwicu | cwica, -e |
| Genitive | cwicra | | |
| Dative−Instrumental | cwicum | | |

Weak declension of cwic
| | Singular | | | Plural |
| | Masculine | Feminine | Neuter | Any gender |
|---|---|---|---|---|
| Nominative | cwica | cwice | cwice | cwican |
| Accusative | cwican | | cwice | cwican |
| Genitive | cwican | | | cwicena |
| Dative−Instrumental | cwican | | | cwicum |

In general, the weak declension is used after the words for "the/that" and "this" and possessive determiners such as "my", "your", and "his", while the strong declension is used the rest of the time. Hence "a live scorpion" is cwic þrōwend, while "the live scorpion" is sē cwica þrōwend. Further details:

- The weak declension is also used in direct address, as in Ēalā fæġere mæġden ("Hey beautiful girl").
- Ordinal numbers and comparative adjectives only take the weak declension, even in situations that would otherwise call for the strong declension. The most important exception is ōðer ("other/second"), which is always strong despite being both an ordinal number and a comparative. Of the four words for "first", forma and ǣrra are always weak, but ǣrest and fyrest can be either strong or weak just like most other adjectives.
- The adjective āgen ("own") is usually strong in the phrase "one's own": Hēo forlēt ōðre dæġe on hire āgnum horse ("She left the next day on her own horse").

=== Irregularities ===
Adjectives once came in many different classes just like nouns, but by Old English times, all adjectives have basically the same endings as cwic above. However, there are still a good number of differences and irregularities:

- As with nouns, there are "light" adjectives which retain the inflectional ending -u (which occurs in the feminine nominative singular and neuter nominative/accusative plural), and "heavy" adjectives which have lost it. Originally -u disappeared after a heavy syllable or two light syllables, but speakers have re-added it to some adjectives where it had been lost. Namely, those with the suffixes -iġ or -līċ: bisigu sweord ("busy swords" [nom. pl. neut.]), broðorlīcu lufu ("brotherly love" [nom. sg. fem.]).
- Some adjectives have -u after a heavy syllable because, when high vowel apocope occurred, they had an intervening light syllable which later disappeared. Examples include lȳtel ("little"), nom. sg. fem./nom-acc. pl. neut lȳtlu; ōðer ("other"), nom. sg. fem./nom-acc. pl. neut ōðru; and ēower ("your"), nom. sg. fem./nom-acc. pl. neut. ēowru.
- Adjectives ending in -e all lose the -e before inflectional endings: blīðe ("happy"), nom. sg. masc. blīðne. They also all retain -u: blīðu ċildru ("happy children").
- If an adjective ends in short æ plus a single consonant, the æ becomes a before endings beginning with a vowel: glæd ("glad"), nom. pl. masc. glade.
- If an adjective ends in h, the h disappears before inflectional endings. This lengthens the preceding vowel or diphthong: þweorh ("crooked"), þwēorre gen. sg. fem. Also, if the h comes right after a vowel, any immediately following vowel disappears: hēah ("high"), acc. sg. masc. hēane, dat. sg. masc. hēam, nom. pl. masc. hēa.
- If an adjective ends in -u, it changes to o before an inflectional ending beginning with a consonant: ġearu ("ready"), acc. sg. masc. ġearone, dat. sg. fem. ġearore. Before a vowel, it changes to w: nom. pl. masc. ġearwe.
- Most adjectives ending in ġ, ċ, or sċ have hard g, c, or sc before an ending beginning with a back vowel (/ɑ/, /o/, /u/). Ġesċādlīċ ("rational"), nom. pl. fem. ġesċādlīca; mennisċ ("human"), dat. sg. neut. menniscum.
- Many adjectives which end in an unstressed vowel plus a single consonant lose the unstressed vowel before endings beginning with vowels: lȳtel ("little"), nom. pl. fem. lȳtla.

=== Degree ===
Old English never uses the equivalents of "more" and "most" to form comparative or superlative adjectives. Instead, the equivalents of "-er" and "-est" are used (-ra and -ost, for some words -est). "More beautiful" is fæġerra, literally "beautiful-er", and "most beautiful" is fæġerost, literally "beautiful-est". (Note: Compare their descendents fairer and fairest in Modern English, as in "who is the fairest of them all?") Other examples include beorht ("bright") → beorhtra ("brighter"), beorhtost ("brightest"); bearnēacen ("pregnant") → bearnēacenra ("more pregnant"), bearnēacnost ("most pregnant"); and cnihtlīċ ("boyish") → cnihtlīcra ("more boyish"), cnihtlīcost ("most boyish"). The only exception is that "more" (mā or swīðor) and "most" (mǣst or swīðost) were sometimes used with participles: swīðor ġelufod ("more loved"), swīðost ġelufod ("most loved").

A handful of words form the comparative and superlative with i-umlaut, namely eald ("old") → ieldra, ieldest; ġeong ("young") → ġingra, ġinġest; strang ("strong") → strengra, strenġest; lang ("long") → lengra, lenġest; sċort ("short") → sċyrtra, sċyrtest; and hēah ("high") → hīera, hīehst.

A few more become totally different words: gōd ("good") → betera, betst; yfel ("bad") → wiersa, wierrest; miċel ("much/a lot/big") → māra ("more/bigger"), mǣst ("most/biggest"); lȳtel ("little") → lǣssa ("less/smaller"), lǣsest ("least/smallest").

== Articles ==
Old English has no indefinite article. Instead, a noun is most often used by itself:

| Old English | Ūs is lēofre þæt wē hæbben healtne cyning þonne healt rīċe. |
| Literal gloss | Us is dearer that we have crippled king than crippled kingdom. |
| Translation | We would rather have a crippled king than a crippled kingdom. |

The definite article is sē, which doubles as the word for "that", comes in eleven different forms depending on case, gender, and number: sē, sēo, þæt, þone, þā, þæs, þǣre, þām, þon, þȳ, and þāra.

Declension of sē
| | Singular | | | Plural |
| | Masculine | Neuter | Feminine | Plural |
|---|---|---|---|---|
| Nominative | sē | þæt | sēo | þā |
| Accusative | þone | þæt | þā | þā |
| Genitive | þæs | | þǣre | þāra |
| Dative | þām | | þǣre | þām |
| Instrumental | þon, þȳ | | þǣre | þām |

The word "the" was used very much like in Modern English. The main difference is that it was used somewhat more sparingly, due to numerous groups of nouns which usually went without it. These include:

- All river names. On Temese flēat ān sċip ("A boat was floating on the Thames").
- Names of peoples. Ex: Seaxan ("the Saxons"), Winedas ("the Slavs"), Siġelhearwan ("the Ethiopians"), Indēas ("the Indians"). Names of peoples also frequently stand for the place they are from: for example, the word for Essex was Ēastseaxan ("the East Saxons"), and "the prince of Denmark" was Dena æðeling, literally "prince of the Danes".
- A few nouns denoting types of locations, namely sǣ ("the sea"), wudu ("the woods"), and eorðe ("the ground"). Þū fēolle on eorðan and slōge þīn hēafod ("You fell on the ground and hit your head"). Also "the world", whether expressed with weorold or middanġeard. Note that "sea" is still sometimes used without "the" in Modern English, in fossilized phrases like "at sea" and "out to sea".
- A couple of abstract concepts, namely sōþ ("the truth") and ǣ ("the law").
- Many divisions of time. Namely, the words for the morning, the evening, the four seasons, the past, the present, and the future. Iċ ārās on lætne morgen and ēode niðer ("I got up late in the morning and went downstairs"). Note that this is similar to Modern English "I go out at night".
- Dryhten ("the Lord"). Dēofol ("the Devil") often occurs with "the" and often without it.
- The cardinal directions: norþ, sūþ, ēast, and west. Also the intercardinal directions: norðēast, sūðēast, sūðwest, and norðwest.
- A few set phrases, including ealle hwīle ("the whole time", literally "all/whole while"), be weġe ("on the way", lit. "by way"), and ealne weġ ("all the way" or "always", lit. "all way"). Also forma sīþ ("the first time"), ōðer sīþ ("the second time"), and so on.

Note that those words still occur with "the" when they refer to a specific iteration, as in "the future that I want", "the woods behind my house", or "the law they just passed".

== Demonstratives ==
Declension of þēs
| | Singular | | | Plural |
| | Masculine | Neuter | Feminine | Plural |
|---|---|---|---|---|
| Nominative | þēs | þis | þēos | þās |
| Accusative | þisne | þis | þās | þās |
| Genitive | þisses | | þisse | þissa |
| Dative | þissum | | þisse | þissum |
| Instrumental | þȳs | | þisse | þissum |

There is also the distal demonstrative ġeon, the source of Modern English "yon". It means "that over there" and refers to things far away. Ġeon is declined like a regular adjective, that is like cwic above.

== Pronouns ==
=== Interrogative pronouns ===
Hwā ("who") and hwæt ("what") follow socio-cultural gender, (Note: Although often referred to simply as gender, this is distinct from grammatical gender.) not grammatical gender: as in Modern English, hwā is used with people, hwæt with things. However, that distinction only matters in the nominative and accusative cases, because in every other case they are identical:

Declension of hwā and hwæt
| | "who" | "what" |
|---|---|---|
| Nominative | hwā | hwæt |
| Accusative | hwone | hwæt |
| Genitive | hwæs | |
| Dative | hwām | |
| Instrumental | hwon, hwȳ | |

Hwelċ ("which" or "what kind of") is inflected like an adjective. Same with hwæðer, which also means "which" but is only used between two alternatives:

| Old English | Hwæðer wēnst þū is māre, þē þīn sweord þē mīn? |
| Translation | Which one do you think is bigger, your sword or mine? |

=== Personal pronouns ===
The first and second-person pronouns are the same for all genders. They also have special dual forms, which are only used for groups of two things, as in "we both" and "you two". The dual forms are common, but the ordinary plural forms can always be used instead when the meaning is clear.

Personal pronouns
| Case | 1st person | | | 2nd person | | | 3rd person | | | |
| Case | Singular | Dual | Plural | Singular | Dual | Plural | Singular | | | Plural |
| Case | Singular | Dual | Plural | Singular | Dual | Plural | Masculine | Neuter | Feminine | Plural |
|---|---|---|---|---|---|---|---|---|---|---|
| Nominative | iċ | wit | wē | þū | ġit | ġē | hē | hit | hēo | hīe |
| Accusative | mē | unc | ūs | þē | inc | ēow | hine | hit | hīe | hīe |
| Dative | mē | unc | ūs | þē | inc | ēow | him | | hire | him |
| Genitive | mīn | uncer | ūre | þīn | incer | ēower | his | | hire | heora |

Whilst most Old English texts have the accusative and dative pronouns in the first and second person merged, some texts, most notably those of Anglian dialects and in poetry, preserve the distinction. mec (accusative) and þec (accusative), the first and second person singular respectively, are descended from the original Proto-Germanic stressed pronouns, meanwhile for the dual and plural, whose accusative and dative forms had merged through regular sound change by the time of Proto-West Germanic, new forms were coined by suffixing -iċ or -it to the dative forms. This gave ūsiċ and ēowiċ for the first and second plural, and uncit and incit for the first and second dual.

Many of the forms above bear a strong resemblance to the Modern English words they eventually became. For instance, in the genitive case, ēower became "your", ūre became "our", and mīn became "my". However, in stressed positions, the plural third-person personal pronouns were all replaced with Old Norse forms during the Middle English period, yielding "they", "them" and "their". (The Old English dative pronoun is retained as unstressed 'em.)

== Verbs ==
Old English verbs are divided into two groups: strong verbs and weak verbs. Strong verbs form the past tense by changing a vowel, while weak verbs add an ending.

=== Strong verbs ===
Strong verbs use a Germanic form of conjugation known as ablaut. They form the past tense by changing their stem vowel. These verbs still exist in modern English; sing, sang, sung is a strong verb, as are swim, swam, swum and break, broke, broken. In modern English, strong verbs are rare, and they are mostly categorised as irregular verbs.

In Old English, meanwhile, strong verbs were much more common and were not considered irregular. The system of strong verbs was more coherent, including seven major classes, each with its own pattern of stem changes.

Over time the system of strong verbs became less functional: new verbs were coined or borrowed as weak verbs, meaning strong verbs became rarer, and sound changes made their patterns harder to distinguish. Many verbs that in Old English were strong verbs, such as: abide, bake, ban, bark, bow, braid, burst, carve, chew, climb, creep, delve, drag, fare, fart, flee, float, flow, gnaw, grip, help, laugh, leap, let, load, lock, melt, milk, mow, quell, read, row, shine, shove, slay, sleep, sneeze, spurn, starve, step, suck, swallow, sweep, swell, thresh, walk, wash, weep, wreak, and yield have become weak verbs in modern English. This tendency for strong verbs to become weak dates as far back as Old English: sleep (slǣpan) and read (rǣdan) both shifted from strong to weak in the Old English period.

Learning strong verbs is often a challenge for students of Old English, though modern English speakers may see connections between the old verb classes and their modern forms.

The classes had the following distinguishing features to their infinitive stems, each corresponding to particular stem changes within their strong-conjugating paradigms:

1. ī + one consonant.
2. ēo or ū + one consonant.
3. Originally e + two consonants. By the time of written Old English, many had changed. If C is used to represent any consonant, verbs in this class usually had short e + lC; short eo + rC; short i + nC/mC; or (g̣ +) short ie + lC.
4. e + one consonant (usually l or r, plus the verb brecan 'to break').
5. e + one consonant (usually a stop or a fricative).
6. a + one consonant.
7. Other than the above. Always a heavy root syllable (either a long vowel or short + two consonants), almost always a non-umlauted vowel – e.g., ō, ā, ēa, a (+ nC), ea (+ lC/rC), occ. ǣ (the latter with past in ē instead of normal ēo). Infinitive is distinguishable from class 1 weak verbs by non-umlauted root vowel; from class 2 weak verbs by lack of suffix -ian. First and second preterite have identical stems, usually in ēo (occ. ē), and the infinitive and the past participle also have the same stem.

Stem changes in strong verbs
| Verb class | | Stem vowel | | | |
| Class | Root weight | Non-past | First past | Second past | Past participle |
|---|---|---|---|---|---|
| 1 | heavy | ī | ā | i | |
| 2 | heavy | ēo, ū | ēa | u | o |
| 3 | heavy | e (+CC) | æ | u | o |
| 3 | heavy | e (+lC), eo (+rC/ hC) | ea | u | o |
| 3 | heavy | i (+nC) | a | u | u |
| 4 | light | e(+r/l) | æ | ǣ | o |
| 5 | light | e(+other) | æ | ǣ | e |
| 6 | light | a | ō | | a |
| 7 | heavy | various | ē or ēo | | same as infinitive |

The first past stem is used in the past, for the first and third-person singular. The second past stem is used for second-person singular, and all persons in the plural (as well as the preterite subjunctive). Strong verbs also exhibit i-mutation of the stem in the second and third-person singular in the present tense.

The third class went through many sound changes, becoming barely recognisable as a single class. The first was a process called 'breaking'. Before ⟨h⟩, and ⟨r⟩ + another consonant, ⟨æ⟩ turned into ⟨ea⟩, and ⟨e⟩ to ⟨eo⟩. Also, before ⟨l⟩ + another consonant, the same happened to ⟨æ⟩, but ⟨e⟩ remained unchanged (except before the combination ⟨lh⟩).

A second sound change turned ⟨e⟩ to ⟨i⟩, ⟨æ⟩ to ⟨a⟩, and ⟨o⟩ to ⟨u⟩ before nasals.

Altogether, this split the third class into four sub-classes:

1. e + two consonants (apart from clusters beginning with l).
2. eo + r or h + another consonant.
3. e + l + another consonant.
4. i + nasal + another consonant.

Regular strong verbs were all conjugated roughly the same, with the main differences being in the stem vowel. Thus stelan "to steal" represents the strong verb conjugation paradigm.

Strong verb conjugation
| Strong verb conjugation | | | | Stelan "to steal" | |
|---|---|---|---|---|---|
| Infinitives | | | | stelan | -an |
| Infinitives | | | | tō stelanne | tō -anne |
| Participle | Present | | | stelende | -ende |
| Participle | Past | | | (ġe)stolen | (ġe)- -en |
| Indicative | Present | Singular | 1st person | stele | -e |
| Indicative | Present | Singular | 2nd person | stilst | -st |
| Indicative | Present | Singular | 3rd person | stilþ | -þ |
| Indicative | Present | Plural | | stelaþ | -aþ |
| Indicative | Past | Singular | 1st person | stæl | -_ |
| Indicative | Past | Singular | 2nd person | stǣle | -e |
| Indicative | Past | Singular | 3rd person | stæl | -_ |
| Indicative | Past | Plural | | stǣlon | -on |
| Subjunctive | Present | Singular | | stele | -e |
| Subjunctive | Present | Plural | | stelen | -en |
| Subjunctive | Past | Singular | | stǣle | -e |
| Subjunctive | Past | Plural | | stǣlen | -en |
| Imperative | | Singular | | stel | -_ |
| Imperative | | Plural | | stelaþ | -aþ |

=== Weak verbs ===
Weak verbs form the past tense by adding endings with -d- in them (sometimes -t-) to the stem. In Modern English, these endings have merged as -ed, forming the past tense for most verbs, such as love, loved and look, looked.

Weak verbs already make up the vast majority of verbs in Old English. There are two major types: class I and class II. A class III also existed, but contained only four verbs.

==== Class I ====
By the Old English period, new class I weak verbs had stopped being produced, but so many had been coined in Proto-Germanic that they were still by far the most common kind of verb in Old English. These verbs are often recognizable because they feature i-umlaut of the word they were derived from, as in dēman ("to judge") from dōm ("judgment"), blǣċan ("to bleach") from blāc ("pale"), tellan ("to count") from tæl ("number"), and rȳman ("to make room") from rūm ("room"). They are also the source of alterations in Modern English such as feed ~ food, fill ~ full, and breed ~ brood.

Class I weak verbs are not all conjugated the same. Their exact endings depend on a complex combination of factors, mostly involving the length of the stem vowel and which consonants the stem ends in, and sometimes also the history of the word. But the largest number are conjugated the same as dǣlan ("to share"):

Conjugation of dǣlan
| Infinitive | dǣlan | (tō) dǣlenne |
| Indicative | Present | Past |
| 1sg. | dǣle | dǣlde |
| 2sg. | dǣlst | dǣldest |
| 3sg. | dǣlþ | dǣlde |
| pl. | dǣlaþ | dǣldon |
| Subjunctive | Present | Past |
| sg. | dǣle | dǣlde |
| pl. | dǣlen | dǣlden |
Imperative
| sg. | dǣl | |
| pl. | dǣlaþ | |
| Participle | Present | Past |
| | dǣlende | (ġe)dǣled |

Many verbs ending in a double consonant are conjugated like temman ("to tame"), with the same endings and the same alternation between single and double consonants:

Conjugation of temman
| Infinitive | teman | (tō) temenne |
| Indicative | Present | Past |
| 1sg. | temme | temede |
| 2sg. | temest | temedest |
| 3sg. | temeþ | temede |
| pl. | temmaþ | temedon |
| Subjunctive | Present | Past |
| sg. | temme | temede |
| pl. | temmen | temeden |
Imperative
| sg. | teme | |
| pl. | temmaþ | |
| Participle | Present | Past |
| | temmende | (ġe)temed |

Class I weak verbs that end in -rian are conjugated like styrian ("to move"):

Conjugation of styrian
| Infinitive | styrian | (tō) styrienne |
| Indicative | Present | Past |
| 1sg. | styrie | styrede |
| 2sg. | styrest | styredest |
| 3sg. | styreþ | styrede |
| pl. | styraþ | styredon |
| Subjunctive | Present | Past |
| sg. | styrie | styrede |
| pl. | styrien | styreden |
Imperative
| sg. | styre | |
| pl. | styriaþ | |
| Participle | Present | Past |
| | styriende | (ġe)styred |

==== Class II ====
Class II weak verbs are easily recognized by the fact that nearly all of them end in -ian: hopian ("to hope"), wincian ("to wink"), wandrian ("to wander").

By the Old English period, this was the only productive verb class left. Newly created verbs were almost automatically weak class II.

Unlike weak class I, they never cause i-umlaut, so their stems are usually identical to the stem of the word they were derived from: lufu ("love") → lufian ("to love"), mynet ("coin") → mynetian ("to coin"), hwelp ("puppy") → hwelpian ("[of animals] to give birth").

Their conjugation is also much simpler than all other verb classes. Almost all weak class II verbs have precisely the same endings, completely unaffected by the makeup of the stem or the history of the word. A typical example is lufian ("to love"):

Conjugation of lufian
| Infinitive | lufian | (tō) lufienne |
| Indicative | Present | Past |
| 1sg. | lufiġe | lufode |
| 2sg. | lufast | lufodest |
| 3sg. | lufaþ | lufode |
| pl. | lufiaþ | lufodon |
| Subjunctive | Present | Past |
| sg. | lufiġe | lufode |
| pl. | lufiġen | lufoden |
Imperative
| sg. | lufa | |
| pl. | lufiaþ | |
| Participle | Present | Past |
| | lufiende | (ġe)lufod |

==== Class III ====
Though it was once much larger, containing many verbs which later became class II, only four verbs still belonged to this group by the period of written texts: habban ("to have"), libban ("to live") seċġan ("to say"), and hyċġan "to think". Each of these verbs is distinctly irregular, though they share some commonalities.

Class 3 weak verbs
| Class 3 weak verbs | | | | Suffixes | Habban "to have" | Libban "to live" | Seċġan "to say" | Hyċġan "to think" |
|---|---|---|---|---|---|---|---|---|
| Infinitives | | | | -an | habban | libban | seċġan | hyċġan |
| Infinitives | | | | tō -enne | tō hæbbenne | tō libbenne | tō seċġenne | tō hyċġenne |
| Participle | Present | | | -ende | hæbbende | libbende | seċġende | hyċġende |
| Participle | Past | | | (ġe) -d | (ġe)hæfd | (ġe)lifd | (ġe)sæġd | (ġe)hogd |
| Indicative | Present | Singular | 1st person | -e | hæbbe | libbe | seċġe | hyċġe |
| Indicative | Present | Singular | 2nd person | -st | hæfst | leofast | sæġst | hyġst |
| Indicative | Present | Singular | 3rd person | -þ | hæfþ | leofaþ | sæġþ | hyġþ |
| Indicative | Present | Plural | | -aþ | habbaþ | libbaþ | seċġaþ | hyċġaþ |
| Indicative | Past | Singular | 1st person | -de | hæfde | lifde | sæġde | hogde |
| Indicative | Past | Singular | 2nd person | -dest | hæfdest | lifdest | sæġdest | hogdest |
| Indicative | Past | Singular | 3rd person | -de | hæfde | lifde | sæġde | hogde |
| Indicative | Past | Plural | | -don | hæfdon | lifdon | sæġdon | hogdon |
| Subjunctive | Present | Singular | | -e | hæbbe | libbe | seċġe | hyċġe |
| Subjunctive | Present | Plural | | -en | hæbben | libben | seċġen | hyċġen |
| Subjunctive | Past | Singular | | -de | hæfde | lifde | sæġde | hogde |
| Subjunctive | Past | Plural | | -den | hæfden | lifden | sæġden | hogden |
| Imperative | | Singular | | -a | hafa | leofa | sæġe | hyġe |
| Imperative | | Plural | | -aþ | habbaþ | libbaþ | seċġaþ | hyċġaþ |

=== Preterite-present verbs ===
The preterite-presents are verbs whose present tenses look like the past tenses of strong verbs. This resemblance is not coincidental, since they descend from Proto-Indo-European stative verbs, which normally developed into the past tense of Germanic languages. The preterite-present verbs are an exception to this development, remaining as independent verbs. For example, the first-person present of witan ("to know") originally meant "I have seen", referring to the state of having seen, and by implication "I know". At some point well before Old English, these verbs were given their own past tenses by adding weak past endings, but without an intervening vowel. This lack of an intervening vowel then led to alternations in the consonants, and sometimes vowels as well.

There are only a dozen preterite-presents, but most are among the most frequent verbs in the language. They are magan ("can"), sċulan ("should/must/to owe"), mōtan ("may"), þurfan ("to need"), witan ("to know"), cunnan ("to know/know how"), ġemunan ("to remember"), durran ("to dare"), āgan ("to own"), dugan ("to be useful"), ġenugan ("to suffice"), and unnan ("to grant").

In spite of heavy irregularities, these can be grouped into four groups of similarly conjugated verbs:

1. Āgan, durran, mōtan, and witan
2. Cunnan, ġemunan (outside the past tense), and unnan
3. Dugan, magan, and ġenugan
4. Sċulan and þurfan

Preterite-present stems
| Preterite-present verbs | | Participle | | Indicative | | | Subjunctive | | Imperative | |
| Class | Infinitive (Meaning) | Present | Past | Present | | Past | Present | Past | Singular | Plural |
| Class | Infinitive (Meaning) | Present | Past | Singular | Plural | Past | Present | Past | Singular | Plural |
|---|---|---|---|---|---|---|---|---|---|---|
| 1 | Āgan "to own" | āgende | (ġe)āgen | āh- | āg- | āht- | āg- | āht- | āge | āgaþ |
| 1 | Durran "to dare" | durrende | (ġe)dorren | dearr- | durr- | dorst- | dyrr- | dyrst- | dyrre | durraþ |
| 1 | Mōtan "may, to be allowed to" | mōtende | (ġe)mōten | mōt- | | mōst | mōt- | mōst- | mōte | mōtaþ |
| 1 | Witan "to know (a fact)" | witende | (ġe)witen | wāt- | wit- | wist- | wit- | wist- | wite | witaþ |
| 2 | Cunnan "to know (how to)" | cunnende | (ġe)cunnen, (ġe)cūþ | cann- | cunn- | cūþ- | cunn- | cūþ- | cunne | cunnaþ |
| 2 | Ġemunan "remember" | ġemunende | ġemunen | ġeman- | ġemun- | ġemund- | ġemun- | ġemund- | ġemune | ġemunaþ |
| 2 | Unnan "grant" | unnende | (ġe)unnen | ann- | unn- | ūþ- | unn- | ūþ- | unne | unnaþ |
| 3 | Dugan "work with, avail" | dugende | (ġe)dugen | deah- | dug- | doht- | dug- | doht- | ġeduge | ġedugaþ |
| 3 | Ġenugan "to suffice, be enough" | ġenugende | ġenugen | ġeneah- | ġenug- | ġenoht- | ġenug- | ġenoht- | ġenuge | ġenugaþ |
| 3 | Magan "can, be able to" | mæġende | (ġe)mæġen | mæg- | mag- | meaht- | mæg- | miht- | mæge | magaþ |
| 4 | Sċulan "should, must" | sċuldende | (ġe)sċulen | sċeal- | sċul- | sċold- | sċyl- | sċyld- | sċyle | sċulaþ |
| 4 | Þurfan "to need" | þurfende | (ġe)þurfen | þearf- | þurf- | þorft- | þyrf- | þyrft- | þyrfe | þurfaþ |

=== Anomalous verbs ===
Additionally, there is a further group of four verbs which are anomalous: "want", "do", "go" and "be". These four have their own conjugation schemes which differ significantly from all the other classes of verb. This is not especially unusual: "want", "do", "go", and "be" are the most commonly used verbs in the language, and are very important to the meaning of the sentences in which they are used. Idiosyncratic patterns of inflection are much more common with important items of vocabulary than with rarely used ones.

Dōn 'to do' and gān 'to go' are conjugated alike; willan 'to want' is similar outside of the present tense.

The verb 'to be' is actually composed of three different stems: one beginning with w-, one beginning with b-, and one beginning with s-. These are traditionally thought of as forming two separate words: wesan, comprising the forms beginning with w- and s-, and bēon, comprising the forms beginning with b-.

In the present tense, wesan and bēon carried a difference in meaning. Wesan was used in most circumstances, whereas bēon was used for the future and for certain kinds of general statements.

Anomalous verbs
| Anomalous verbs | | | | Bēon, "to be" | Wesan, "to be" | Dōn, "to do" | Gān, "to go" | Willan "to want" |
|---|---|---|---|---|---|---|---|---|
| Infinitive | | | | bēon | wesan | dōn | gān | willan |
| Infinitive | | | | tō bēonne | to wesanne | tō dōnne | tō gānne | tō willenne |
| Participle | Present | | | bēonde | wesende | dōnde | gānde | willende |
| Participle | Past | | | (ġe)bēon | | (ġe)dōn | (ġe)gān | *(ġe)willen |
| Indicative | Present | Singular | 1st person | bēo | eom | dō | gā | wille |
| Indicative | Present | Singular | 2nd person | bist | eart | dēst | gǣst | wilt |
| Indicative | Present | Singular | 3rd person | biþ | is | dēþ | gǣþ | wile |
| Indicative | Present | Plural | | bēoþ | sind | dōþ | gāþ | willaþ |
| Indicative | Past | Singular | 1st person | wæs | | dyde | ēode | wolde |
| Indicative | Past | Singular | 2nd person | wǣre | | dydest | ēodest | woldest |
| Indicative | Past | Singular | 3rd person | wæs | | dyde | ēode | wolde |
| Indicative | Past | Plural | | wǣron | | dydon | ēodon | woldon |
| Subjunctive | Present | Singular | | bēo | sīe | dō | gā | wille |
| Subjunctive | Present | Plural | | bēon | sīen | dōn | gān | willen |
| Subjunctive | Past | Singular | | wǣre | | dyde | ēode | wolde |
| Subjunctive | Past | Plural | | wǣren | | dyden | ēoden | wolden |
| Imperative | | Singular | | bēo | wes | dō | gā | wille |
| Imperative | | Plural | | bēoþ | wesaþ | dōþ | gāþ | willaþ |

== Prepositions ==
Prepositions (like Modern English words by, for, and with) sometimes follow the word which they govern (especially pronouns), in which case they are called postpositions.

The following is a list of prepositions in the Old English language. Prepositions may govern the accusative, genitive, dative or instrumental cases.

Prepositions
| Old English | Definition | Notes |
|---|---|---|
| æfter | after | Related to Frisian efter, Dutch achter ("behind"), Icelandic eftir. Ancestor of modern after. |
| ǣr | before | Related to German eher and Icelandic áður. Ancestor of modern ere. |
| æt | at | Related to Icelandic að ("to, towards"), and more distantly Latin ad and its descendants in the Romance languages. Ancestor of modern at. |
| andlang | along | Related to German entlang. Ancestor of modern along. Governs the genitive. |
| bæftan | behind | Ancestor of modern (nautical) abaft. |
| be, bī | by, about | Related to West Frisian by, Low German bi, Dutch bij, German bei. Ancestor of modern by. |
| beforan | before | Related to German bevor. Ancestor of modern before. |
| beġeondan | beyond | Ancestor of modern beyond |
| behindan | behind | Ancestor of modern behind. Related to German hinter. |
| binnan | in, within | Related to German and Dutch binnen |
| benēoðan | beneath | Ancestor of modern beneath. |
| betwēonum | between | Ancestor of modern between |
| bufan | above | Ancestor of modern above through compound form onbufan |
| būtan | without, except | Related to Dutch buiten. Ancestor of modern but. |
| ēac | also | Related to Frisian ek, Low German ook, Dutch ook, and German auch. Ancestor of modern (archaic) eke |
| for | for, because of, instead of | Ancestor of modern for, related to modern German für |
| fram | from, by | Ancestor of modern from |
| ġeond | through | Ancestor of modern yonder through comparative form ġeondra. Related to Dutch ginds and (archaic) ginder |
| in | in | Ancestor of modern in, related to German and Latin in |
| innan | within | Related to modern German innen |
| intō | into | Ancestor of modern into |
| mid | with | Related to modern German mit |
| nēah | near | Ancestor of modern nigh. German nah |
| of | from, out of | Ancestor of modern of and off |
| ofer | over | Ancestor of modern over |
| on | on, in | Ancestor of modern on |
| onbūtan | around | Ancestor of modern about |
| onġēan | opposite, against; towards; in reply to | Ancestor of modern again. Related to German entgegen |
| oþ | until | |
| samod | together | Related to German samt |
| tō | to | Ancestor of modern to, related to German zu |
| tōeācan | in addition to, besides | |
| tōforan | before | Related to Dutch tevoren, German zuvor |
| tōgeagnes | towards, against | Related to Dutch tegen |
| tōweard | toward | Ancestor of modern toward |
| þurh | through | Ancestor of modern through. Related to German durch. |
| under | under | Ancestor of modern under, related to German unter |
| undernēoðan | underneath | Ancestor of modern underneath |
| uppon | upon, on | Not the ancestor of modern upon, which came from "up on". |
| ūtan | without, outside of | Related to modern Swedish utan, German außen. The adverbial form ūt is the ancestor of modern out. |
| wiþ | against | Ancestor of modern with |
| wiþinnan | within | Ancestor of modern within |
| wiþūtan | outside of | Ancestor of modern without |
| ymb | around | Related to modern German um and Latin ambi |

== Syntax ==
Old English syntax was similar in many ways to that of Modern English. However, there were some important differences. Some were simply consequences of the greater level of nominal and verbal inflection, and word order was generally freer. There are also differences in the default word order and in the construction of negation, questions, relative clauses and subordinate clauses.

- The default word order was verb-second; this resembles modern German or Dutch more than Modern English.
- There was no do-support in questions and negatives.
- Multiple negatives could stack up in a sentence and intensified each other (negative concord).
- Sentences with subordinate clauses of the type "When X, Y" did not use a wh-type word for the conjunction but used a th-type correlative conjunction (e.g., þā X, þā Y instead of "When X, Y").

=== Word order ===
There was some flexibility in word order of Old English since the heavily inflected nature of nouns, adjectives, and verbs often indicated the relationships between clause arguments. Scrambling of constituents was common. Even sometimes scrambling within a constituent occurred, as in Beowulf line 708 wrāþum on andan:

| wrāþum | on | andan |
| hostile (Dative Singular) | on/with | malice (Dative Singular) |
"with hostile malice"

Something similar occurs in line 713 in sele þām hēan "in the high hall" (lit. "in hall the high").

Extraposition of constituents out of larger constituents is common even in prose, as in the well-known tale of Cynewulf and Cyneheard, which begins

Hēr Cynewulf benam Sigebryht his rīces ond westseaxna wiotan for unryhtum dǣdum, būton Hamtūnscīre; ...
(Literally) "Here Cynewulf deprived Sigebryht of his kingdom and West Saxons' counselors for unright deeds, except Hampshire"
(translated) "Here Cynewulf and the West Saxon counselors deprived Sigebryht of his kingdom, other than Hampshire, for unjust actions"

The words ond westseaxna wiotan "and the West Saxon counselors" (lit. "and (the) counselors of (the) West Saxons") have been extraposed from (moved out of) the compound subject they belong in, in a way that would be impossible in modern English. In Old English, case inflection preserves the meaning: the verb beniman "to deprive" (appearing in this sentence in the form benam, "[he] deprived") needs a word in the genitive case to show what someone or something is deprived of, which in this sentence is rīces "of kingdom" (nominative rīce, "kingdom"), whereas wiotan "counselors" is in the nominative case and therefore serves a different role entirely (the genitive of it would be wiotana, "of counselors"); for this reason the interpretation that Cynewulf deprived Sigebryht of the West Saxon counselors was not possible for speakers of Old English. The Old English sentence is in theory ambiguous, as it contains one more word in the genitive: westseaxna ("of West Saxons", nominative westseaxan "West Saxons"), and the form wiotan "counselors" may also represent the accusative case in addition to the nominative, thus for example creating the grammatical possibility of the interpretation that Cynewulf also took the West Saxons away from the counselors, but this would have been difficult to conceive.

Main clauses in Old English tend to have a verb-second (V2) order, where the finite verb is the second constituent in a sentence, regardless of what comes first. There are vestigial examples of this in modern English: Rarely have I seen ... However, V2 order was much more extensive in Old English.

In subordinate clauses, the word order is less restricted, with both verb-second and verb-final word order occurring, though verb-final is more common. Furthermore, in poetry, the rules of prose are frequently broken. In Beowulf, for example, main clauses frequently have verb-initial or verb-final order, recalling earlier stages of Old English syntax. (However, in clauses introduced by þā, which can mean either "when" or "then", and where word order is crucial for telling the difference, the normal word order is nearly always followed.)

Linguists who work within the Chomskyan transformational grammar paradigm often believe that it is more accurate to describe Old English (and other Germanic languages with the same word-order patterns like modern German) as having underlying subject-object-verb (SOV) ordering. According to this theory, all sentences are initially generated using this order, but in main clauses, the verb is moved back to the V2 position (technically, the verb undergoes V-to-T raising). That is said to explain the fact that Old English allows inversion of subject and verb as a general strategy for forming questions, while modern English uses this strategy almost only with auxiliary verbs and the main verb "to be", requiring do-support in other cases.

==== Questions ====
Questions are normally formed in Old English by inverting the order of subject and finite verb. For example, hīe libbaþ "they live" becomes libbaþ hīe, literally "live they?" This is still followed in modern English with verbs such as be (am I?) and have (have they?) but for most other contexts it has been replaced by do-support.

=== Relative and subordinate clauses ===
Old English did not use forms equivalent to "who, when, where" in relative clauses (as in "The man whom I saw") or subordinate clauses ("When I got home, I went to sleep").

Instead, relative clauses used one of the following:

1. An invariable complementizer þe
2. The demonstrative pronoun se, sēo, þæt
3. The combination of the two, as in se þe

Subordinate clauses tended to use correlative conjunctions, e.g.

Þā ic hām ēode, þā slēp ic.
(word-for-word) "Then I home went, then slept I."
(translated) "When I went home, I slept."

The word order usually distinguished the subordinate clause (with verb-final order) from the main clause (with verb-second word order).

The equivalents of "who, when, where" were used only as interrogative pronouns and indefinite pronouns, as in Ancient Greek and Sanskrit.

Besides þā ... þā ..., other correlative conjunctions occurred, often in pairs of identical words, e.g.:

- þǣr X, þǣr Y: "Where X, Y"
- þanon X, þanon Y: "Whence (from where/wherefrom) X, Y"
- þider X, þider Y: "Whither (to where/whereto) X, Y"
- þēah (þe) X, þēah Y: "Although X, Y"
- þenden X, þenden Y: "While X, Y"
- þonne X, þonne Y: "Whenever X, Y"
- þæs X, þæs Y: "As/after/since X, Y"
- þȳ X, þȳ Y: "The more X, the more Y"

== Phonology ==
The phonology of Old English is necessarily somewhat speculative, since it is preserved purely as a written language. Nevertheless, there is a very large corpus of Old English, and the written language apparently indicates phonological alternations quite faithfully, so it is not difficult to draw certain conclusions about the nature of Old English phonology.

== See also ==
- Middle English
- Old English phonology

== Sources ==
- Hogg, Richard M. (2011). A Grammar of Old English: Morphology. Vol. 2. Oxford: Wiley-Blackwell.
- Mitchell, Bruce (1985). Old English Syntax. Oxford: Oxford University Press.
- Moore, Samuel; Knott, Thomas A. (1958) [1919]. Hulbert, James R. (ed.). The Elements of Old English (10th ed.). Ann Arbor, Michigan: George Wahr Publishing Co.
- Ringe, Don; Taylor, Ann (2014). The Development of Old English. Oxford: Oxford University Press.
- The Magic Sheet, one page color PDF summarizing Old English declension, from Peter S. Baker, inspired by Moore and Marckwardt's 1951 Historical Outlines of English Sounds and Inflections
- J. Bosworth & T.N. Toller, An Anglo-Saxon dictionary: Germanic Lexicon Project
