= Weak verb =

Weak verb may refer to:

- Germanic weak verb, verbs in Germanic languages that form their preterites and past participles by means of a dental suffix
- Weak inflection, a system of verb conjugation contrasted with an alternative "strong inflection" in the same language
- Light verb, a verb that has little semantic content of its own

== See also ==
- Strong verb (disambiguation)
- Regular verb, a verb whose conjugation follows the typical pattern of the language to which it belongs
