= Strong verb =

Strong verb may refer to:

- Germanic strong verb, a verb that marks its past tense by means of changes to the stem vowel
- Strong inflection, a system of verb conjugation contrasted with an alternative "weak" system in the same language
- Irregular verb, any verb whose conjugation does not follow the typical pattern of the language to which it belongs

== See also ==
- Weak verb (disambiguation)
