= Old Saxon phonology =

Pronunciation and sounds of Old Saxon

The phonology of Old Saxon mirrors that of the other ancient Germanic languages, and also, to a lesser extent, that of modern West Germanic languages such as English, Dutch, Frisian, German, and Low German.

Old Saxon is an Ingvaeonic language, which means that it belongs to the West Germanic branch of the Germanic languages and that it is particularly closely related to Old English and Old Frisian. Thus, anyone looking at Old Saxon phonology will recognize some typical West-Germanic phonological features also found in Old English, such as gemination and the different pronunciations of the letter g.

== Distinctive features ==
Old Saxon was in a direct continuum with Old Dutch, with which it shares the distribution of the reflexes of Proto-Germanic *ai and *au, which monophthongize to /ɛː/ and /ɔː/ unless followed by a semivowel or, in the case of *ai, under the influence of an umlaut. This contrasts with Old High German and South Low Franconian, which monophthongizes *ai and *au only in front of certain consonants and word-finally, thus creating no distinction between older *ai and its umlaut. In a similar vein, Old English merges both Proto-Germanic *au and *auw into /æːɑ/, whereas Old Frisian partially merges older *ai and *au into /ā/.

Old Saxon, unlike the other West Germanic languages, consistently preserves Germanic -j- after a consonant, e.g. hēliand ('savior'), cf. Old High German: heilant, Old English: hǣlend, Gothic: háiljands.

== Consonants ==
The table below lists the consonantal phonemes of Old Saxon.

Old Saxon consonant phonemes
	Labial		Dental/ Alveolar		Palatal/ Velar		Glottal
Nasal		m		n			
Plosive	p	b	t	d	k		
Fricative (sibilant)	f	(v)	θ	(ð)	(x)	ɣ	h
Fricative (sibilant)			s̺	(z)			
Approximant		w		l		j	
Rhotic				r			

Notes

- The voiceless spirants /f/, /θ/, and /s/ gain voiced allophones ([v], [ð], and [z]) when between vowels. This change is only faithfully reflected in writing for [v] (represented with letters such as ⟨ƀ⟩ and ⟨u⟩). The other two allophones continued to be written as before.
- Fricatives were devoiced again word finally and before voiceless consonants. Beginning in the later Old Saxon period, stops became devoiced word-finally as well.
- [x] is an allophone of both /h/ and /ɣ/ in these positions. In some regions, it might have been realized as palatal [ç] when in contact with front vowels. For /h/, the allophone does not result from devoicing, it is rather a retention of the original sound from Proto-Germanic, where /h/ was realised as [x] in all positions.
- The fricatives /f, v/ might have been labiodental or bilabial, as in Proto-Germanic. Low German dialects, the modern descendants of Old Saxon, have both variants, realizing Old Saxon /v/ variably as [v, ʋ, β, w]; /f/ on the other hand is invariably [f].
- /n, t, d, θ, l/ could have been either dental [n̪, t̪, d̪, θ, l̪] or alveolar [n͇, t͇, d͇, θ͇, l͇].
- /s̺/ was almost certainly apico-alveolar, and possibly retracted, as in Old and Middle High German, modern Icelandic and most notably Westphalian Low German, the most conservative modern descendant of Old Saxon.
- /n/ had a velar allophone [ŋ] when it occurred before the velars /k, ɡ/.
- /ɣ/ was stopped in gemination and after [ŋ]. This process occurs in all West Germanic languages.
  - Before front vowels, it was palatalized to some extent, probably resulting in post-palatal [ʝ̠] or palatal [ʝ].
- /r/ was most likely alveolar, either a trill [r͇] or a tap [ɾ͇].
- Most consonants could be geminated. Notably, gemination of /v/ gave [bː], and gemination of /ɣ/ gave [ɡː]. In the gemination of /h/, the older pronunciation [xː] was retained.
  - [v] was not devoiced before /d/.
- /k/ was strongly palatalized before front vowels and affricated in the late stages of the language. The spellings of the affricate are ⟨x⟩, ⟨z⟩, ⟨c⟩ etc. This process was fully reverted in Middle Low German, with the exception of very few relic words, where the consonant merges into /s̺/.

== Vowels ==
Old Saxon monophthongs
	Front				Back	
	unrounded		rounded		Back	
	short	long	short	long	short	long
Close	ɪ	iː	(ʏ)	(yː)	ʊ	uː
Close-mid	(e)	eː		(øː)		oː
Open-mid	ɛ	ɛː	(œ)	(œː)	ɔ	ɔː
Open	(æ)	(æː)			ɑ	ɑː

Notes:

- Although not indicated in spelling, it is likely that all vowels also occurred in a nasalized form where Proto-Germanic had a nasal consonant before a fricative. This can be inferred from the fact that Middle Low German restores the consonant in almost all instances, which would not have been possible from oral vowels.
- Long vowels were rare in unstressed syllables and mostly occurred due to suffixation or compounding.
- The pronunciations of most vowels are only given as indicators of their pronunciation relative to each other and do not represent absolute values, which might be higher or lower. For example, some modern dialects pronounce the Old Saxon pair of /e/ and /ɛ/ as such (i.e. [e] and [ɛ]) while others pronounce them lower, i.e. [ɛ] and [æ].
- All front rounded vowels are non-phonemic allophones of the back rounded vowels of the same height, occurring if the following syllable contained an /i/ or /j/. Similarly, /e/ is an allophone of /ɛ/ and /ɑ/ in the same position. The process was blocked by certain consonant clusters beginning with [x]. These allophones became phonemicized when unstressed vowels were elided in later stages of Old Saxon. This process of fronting and phonemization is called 'primary umlaut' by scholars of Old Saxon and Old High German. In later stages of the language, the process repeated once more, but this time was blocked solely by [xː]. This second wave is called 'secondary umlaut'. Only the primary umlaut of /ɑ/ is indicated in Old Saxon spelling, so it cannot be said for certain whether the other front rounded vowels are a result of the primary or secondary umlaut wave.
- The backness of /ɑ/ and /ɑː/ is unknown, but fully front realizations [a, aː] are the most unlikely due to the presence of distinctive /æ(ː)/, which are their umlauted forms. Thus, they were likely no more front than central [ä, äː], with back [ɑ, ɑː] being also possible realizations. The merger of /ɑ/ and /ɔ/ into /ɔ/ in front of /ld/, as well as the tendency of Westphalian Old Saxon of spelling /ɔr/ as ⟨ar⟩ is thus another indicator that /ɑ/ was not as strongly fronted as it is in some modern Low German variants.
  - Long /ɑː/ offers no hint as to its pronunciation. It descends from Proto-Germanic /æː/ (*ē^{1}) hinting at a frontal pronunciation in old West Germanic times. On the other hand, it became a rounded back vowel in all descendants of Old Saxon.
- The more open /ɛ/ represents Proto-Germanic *e. It was spelled ⟨e⟩.
- The closed phoneme /e/ represents the umlaut of Proto-Germanic *a and *e. It was also spelled ⟨e⟩ and probably was identical with /ɛ/ in its earlier stages. The two phonemes are only distinguished in southern dialects in modern times, merging into /ɛ/ in most regions. This might have already been the case in Old Saxon, i.e. the distinction between /e/ and /ɛ/ might not have developed in all areas.
- The frontal phone /æ/ is the secondary umlaut of /ɑ/. It was spelled ⟨a⟩ well into the Renaissance, before ⟨e⟩ became the dominant spelling. Its pronunciation was either [æ] or [a].
- /ɛː/ and /ɔː/ stem from Proto-Germanic *ai and *au.
- Closed /eː/ and /oː/ continue Proto-Germanic *ē^{2} and *ō.
- /æː/ is the primary umlaut of /ɑː/. It was spelled ⟨a⟩, just like its short equivalent of later times.

== Diphthongs ==
Old Saxon diphthongs
	Front	Back
Opening	io/ia/ie	(uo)
Height-harmonic	iu	
Closing	aːi ɛi ɛu	ɑu ɔːi oːi

Notes:

- The diphthong spelled ⟨io⟩ in the Heliand, the most extensive piece of Old Saxon writing, is spelled ⟨ia⟩ in most texts and ⟨ie⟩ in some. It might have been opening /io/ or /iə/, or harmonic /eo/, as in Old English. It is likely that it gradually opened from /io/ to /iɒ/, accounting for different spellings. In later times, it merged with /eː/ in all dialects except southeastern Eastphalian.
- The opening diphthong /uo/ is a regional variant for /oː/. There is a similar situation for /eː/ and /ie/, although it is less spread.
- A closing diphthong /ɛi/ or /ei/ (possibly long /ɛːi/ or /eːi/) is the umlaut of /ɛː/, as well as the result of a Proto-Germanic *ajj-. It was not usually indicated in writing, as seen in e.g. the spelling heliand for /hɛɪljand/, but is thoroughly distinguished from Old Saxon /ɛː/ in the majority of the Low German area until the current day.
- Similarly, /au/ and /ɛu/ are descendants of Proto-Germanic *aww- and *eww-. Unlike /ɛi/, they are always followed by a corresponding semivowel, as in hauwan and breuwan. Thus they could just as well be analyzed as a short vowel followed by a geminated consonant.
- The closing diphthongs ⟨ei⟩ and ⟨ou⟩ sometimes occur in texts (especially in Genesis), probably under the influence of Franconian or Old High German dialects, where they replace Old Saxon developments /ɛː/ and /ɔː/ in all positions.
- /ɔːi/ is the known umlaut of /au/. The situation in Middle Low German hints that there could have been unrecorded reflexes for this umlaut in other dialects, e.g. /œːi/ or /ɛu/, but Middle Low German forms sometimes are analogous or secondary, rather than directly reflecting Old Saxon structures, and often hard to interpret due to warring orthographic traditions.
- /oːi/ as well as /aːi/ are created in class 7 strong verbs whose stem ended in a vowel, partially by the insertion of epenthetic /j/. For example, Proto-Germanic *blōaną/*wēaną gave Old Saxon blōian and wāian, whose 3rd person singulars were blōid/wāid. (Cf. a class 7 verb with medial consonant: hētan, 3rd Person hētid.)
- ⟨iu⟩ is the umlaut of the diphthong spelled ⟨io⟩ and ⟨ia⟩. It was probably realized as [iy].
- There were also "long" diphthongs /oːu/, /aːu/ and /eːu/. These were however treated as two-syllable sequences of a long vowel followed by a short one, not proper diphthongs.

== See also ==
- Old Saxon
- Old Saxon grammar

== General references ==
- Johan Hendrik Gallée (1910). Altsächsische Grammatik (in German) (2nd ed.). Halle (Saale): Max Niemeyer Verlag. LCCN 12005859. OCLC 3128438. OL 6541088M. Wikidata Q131582014.
- Robinson, Orrin W. (1992). Old English and its closest relatives. Stanford: Stanford University Press. ISBN 0804714541. LCCN 90024700. OCLC 1150958619. OL 1866584M.
- Helfenstein, Jacob (1870). Comparative Grammar of the Teutonic languages. London: Macmillan. OCLC 456068779. OL 7706011W.
- Rauch, Irmengard (1992). The Old Saxon Language. New York: Peter Lang Publishing. ISBN 0820418935. LCCN 92020320. OCLC 26052698. OL 1717740M.
