= Old English subjunctive =

In Old English, the subjunctive mood is a flexible grammatical instrument for expressing different gradients in thought when referring to events that are not stated as fact. In modern English, only remnants of a once complex system of separate conjugations exist. Where Old English tended to use conjugation to concisely express meaning, modern English instead relies on modal constructions which typically require an extra word.

== Etymology ==
The word subjunctive as used to denote grammatical mood derives directly from the Latin modus subjunctivus. This, in itself, is a translation from Greek. The original Greek term is hypotaktike enklisis (i.e. subordinated mood). In Greek, the subjunctive is almost exclusively used in subordinate clauses. The earliest known usage of the term subjunctive in English dates from the 16th century.

== History ==
The subjunctive mood in Old English can, theoretically, be traced back to its origins in the Indo-European proto-language (i.e. the reconstructed hypothetical proto-language that is deemed to be the parent of many language families). These include Germanic languages (including English), Latinate Romance languages, Slavic languages, Celtic languages and several others, of which the Anatolian Branch is completely extinct. It has two closely related moods: the subjunctive and the optative. Many of its daughter languages combined or confounded these moods.

== Indo-European optative ==
In Indo-European, the optative mood was formed with a suffix *ieh or *ih (containing sounds as explained by laryngeal theory). It expressed wishes or hopes.

== Indo-European subjunctive ==
In Indo-European, the subjunctive was formed by using the full ablaut grade of the root of the verb, and adding the thematic vowel *-e- or *-o- to the root stem, with the full, primary set of personal inflections. The subjunctive was the Indo-European irrealis, used for hypothetical or nonfactual situations.

== Proto-Germanic subjunctive ==
Already in Proto-Germanic (the distant ancestor of English, German, Dutch and Yiddish, as well as others), the optative became completely subsumed by the subjunctive. An example of the sound shifts evident after this subsuming can be seen in the verb beran 1st pers. sing. pret. sub. bērī, 2nd pers. sing. pret. sub. bērīz, 3rd pers. sing. bērī and respectively the plural forms bērīme, bērīd̵, bērīd̵.

From Proto-Germanic, the subjunctive mood passed down into the Ingvaeonic Anglo-Frisian group, also referred to as Insular Germanic, of which Old English is a member. Simplification of inflections took place along the way. The preterite subjunctive of beran now has only one form for singular, bǣre, and also only one form for plural, bǣren.

Uses Of Subjunctive	Detail
1. Wish or Desire	Nó ðæt ýde byð tó be-fleonne – fremme sé þe wille- (Beowulf, ll. 1003-04) Not at all is [it] easy to escape – try as he might, he who will- The weak (I) verb “fremman” is rendered here in the third person singular present subjunctive. The phrase “try as he might” is an idiom in English and retains the now almost defunct subjunctive. In the indicative form of the verb, this would be “tries”. In order to render the correct nuance in modern English the modal verb “might” needs to be employed. In Old English a simple change from indicative to subjunctive suffices for such a shift in meaning.
2. Command, Requirement, Suggestion and Recommendation	Hroðgar sume worde hét þæt iċ his ǽrest ðé ést ġe-sæde... (Beowulf, ll. 2156-57) Hrothgar commanded through certain word[s] that I first should declare to you his regard... The sense of a transferred imperative (i.e. the imperative of Hrothgar as transferred to the iċ character) rendered by the third person singular past subjunctive form of (ge)secgan is expressed in modern English with the modal construction should + infinitive.
3. After impersonal verbs	Ús dafenaþ ðæt wé waċien. [It] is fitting for us that we should stay awake. Here the subjunctive gives a sense of a moral code acting on the speaker from outside and also adds to the sense of the stated not being in the realm of facts.
4. Hypothetical Situations	Sentences introducing a hypothetical concept often start with swelċe (as if), ġif (if), bútan (unless) and þéah or þéah þe (although). Ġif messe-preost his áġen líf ríhtliċe fadie, þonne is ríht þæt his wurðscipe wexe. If a priest lives his own life in a righteous way, then [it] is right that his honour should grow.

== Modern English ==
The subjunctive is rarely used in modern English presenting difficulties for modern speakers. One use in modern English is to state conclusions contrary to fact, as in the example from the song If I Were a Carpenter: "If I were a carpenter, and you were a lady, would you marry me anyway?" - the use of the subjunctive were (compared with the indicative was) implies that the speaker is not a carpenter.

Another use of the subjunctive in modern English is for noun clauses that follow certain types of verbs of command and desire. In this usage the subjunctives convey that the noun clause is describing a state that is a possibility driven by a command or desire, yet not a present reality or future certainty. The following are examples: "I wish that I were wiser", "I move that the knight be deposed" or "The king commanded that the knight go on a quest".

== See also ==
- English subjunctive

== Bibliography ==
- Hasenfratz, Robert and Jambeck, Thomas. Reading Old English. West Virginia, USA, West Virginian Press, 2005.
