= Strong inflection =

Verb conjugation system

A strong inflection is a system of verb conjugation or noun/adjective declension which can be contrasted with an alternative system in the same language, which is then known as a weak inflection. The term strong was coined with reference to the Germanic verb, but has since been used of other phenomena in these and other languages, which may or may not be analogous. Note that there is nothing objectively "strong" about a strong form; the term is only meaningful in opposition to "weak" as a means of distinguishing paradigms within a single language. Nor is there any distinguishing feature common to all strong forms, except that they are always counterpoints to "weak" ones.

The Germanic strong verb, occurring in Germanic languages such as German and English, is characterised by a vowel shift called ablaut. Examples in English include give/gave, come/came, fall/fell. There is nothing comparable in the German strong adjective inflections. For a full discussion of this distinction see weak inflection.

The strong inflection has been studied in the Greek language since the late eighteenth century. There has also been research into strong inflection in the English language.
