= Weak inflection =

Verb conjugation system

In grammar, the term weak (originally coined in German: schwach) is used in opposition to the term strong (stark) to designate a conjugation or declension when a language has two parallel systems. The only constant feature in all the grammatical usages of the word "weak" is that it forms a polarity with "strong"; there is not necessarily any objective "weakness" about the forms so designated.

== Germanic grammar ==
=== Verbs ===
This terminology seems to have been used first in relation to Germanic verbs. In this context, "strong" indicates those verbs whose past tenses are formed by ablaut (the vocalic conjugations), "weak" those whose past tenses are formed by the addition of a dental suffix (the consonantal conjugations). It is only in this context that the term would be applied to modern English.

=== Nouns ===
By extension, the terminology was also applied to Germanic nouns. Here too, the weak noun was the consonantal declension, such as the German nouns that form their genitive in -n. Examples:

standard noun: der Mann, des Mannes 'man'
weak noun (or n-declension): der Junge, des Jungen 'boy'

Although the term "weak noun" is very useful in German grammar to describe this very small and distinctive group, the term "strong noun" is less commonly heard, since it would have to include many other noun types that should not necessarily be grouped together. Some of these have umlaut plurals (die Männer), but most do not.

=== Adjectives ===
There are also strong and weak declensions of German adjectives. This differs from the situation in nouns and verbs in that every adjective can be declined using either the strong or the weak declension. As with the nouns, weak in this case means the declension in -n. In this context, the terms "strong" and "weak" seem particularly appropriate, since the strong declension carries more information about case and gender, while the weak declension is used in situations where the definite article already provides this information. Examples:

strong:

guter Wein (nom)
guten Wein (acc)
gutem Wein (dat)

adjectives signal case with unambiguous inflections.

weak:

der gute Wein (nom)
den guten Wein (acc)
dem guten Wein (dat)

articles signal case, so adjectives need less inflectional specificity.

== Other languages ==
In other languages the strong-weak polarity is used to express distinctions that may or may not be analogous. In Hebrew, most verbs have three consonants known as radicals. These can be strong (able to carry a full syllable) or weak (likely to collapse under the weight of a prefix or suffix). Verbs with a weak radical are termed weak verbs, and form partially regular exceptions to the normal conjugation rule. The consonants he, waw, and nun are among those likely to make a verb weak.

== Regularity ==
The terms "weak" and "strong" rarely overlap with the idea of "regular" and "irregular"; some descriptions of English verbs contrast "weak" with "irregular", but this is misleading. It is true that most English or German weak verbs are regular, whereas Germanic strong verbs, despite the regularity of the system, are normally taught as irregular verbs; but there are also irregular weak verbs in English and German, and in Hebrew the weak verbs are the most irregular ones. In the case of the German noun, the strong noun is the norm, while the weak noun is usually taught as the anomalous form, though in fact it has its own regularity. In the German adjective, both systems are equally regular and equally common.
