= Peter Schrijver =

Dutch linguist

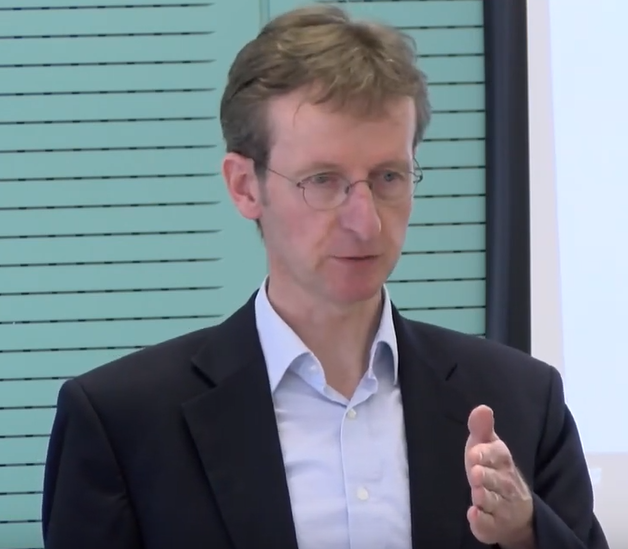
- Schrijver in 2019
- Born: 1963 (age 62–63)

Academic background
- Education: Leiden University

Peter Schrijver (Dutch: [ˈpeːtər ˈsxrɛivər]; born 1963) is a Dutch linguist. He is a professor of Celtic languages at Utrecht University and a researcher of ancient Indo-European linguistics. He worked previously at Leiden University and LMU Munich.

He has published four books and numerous articles on the history and the linguistics of Indo-European languages, particularly the description, reconstruction and syntax of the Celtic languages, and has lately been researching language change and language contact in ancient Europe.

== Biography ==
Born in Delft in 1963, Schrijver studied from 1981 classical philology, comparative Indo-European linguistics and Caucasian linguistics at Leiden University and obtained a PhD cum laude there in 1991 with the dissertation The Reflexes of the Proto-Indo-European Laryngeals in Latin. He did postdoctoral research in historical Celtic linguistics as a fellow of the Royal Netherlands Academy of Arts and Sciences between 1992 and 1997.

Schrijver became the chair of linguistics at LMU Munich in 1999. Since 2005, he has been the chair of Celtic languages and culture at Utrecht University and he has been vice-dean of the Faculty of Humanities since 2015.

== Works ==
=== Books ===
- 1991: The Reflexes of the Proto-Indo-European Laryngeals in Latin. Doctoral dissertation. Leiden Studies in Indo-European 2. Amsterdam/Atlanta: Rodopi. ISBN 978-90-5183-308-9
- 1995: Studies in British Celtic Historical Phonology. Amsterdam: Rodopi. ISBN 90-5183-820-4.
- 1997: Studies in the History of Celtic Pronouns and Particles. Maynooth: Department of Old Irish, National University of Ireland. ISBN 0-901519-59-6.
- 2014: Language Contact and the Origins of the Germanic Languages. New York & Abingdon: Routledge. ISBN 978-0-415-35548-3.

Edited volume

- 2004: with Peter-Arnold Mumm (eds.), Sprachtod und Sprachgeburt. Bremen: Dr. Ute Hempen.

=== Articles and book chapters ===
- 1990: “Latin festīnāre, Welsh brys”, Münchener Studien zur Sprachwissenschaft 51: 243–247.
- 1991: “The development of primitive Irish *aN before voiced stop”, Ériu 42: 13–25.
- 1992: “The development of PIE *sk- in British”, Bulletin of the Board of Celtic Studies 39: 1–15.
- 1993:
  - “On the development of vowels before tautosyllabic nasals in Primitive Irish”, Ériu 44: 33–52.
  - “Varia IV. OIr. dëec, dëac”, Ériu 44: 181–184.
- 1994: “The Celtic adverbs for ‘against’ and ‘with’ and the early apocope of *-i”, Ériu 45: 151–189.
- 1996: “OIr. gor ‘pious, dutiful’: meaning and etymology”, Ériu 47: 193–204.
- 1997: “Animal, vegetable and mineral: Some western European substratum words”, in Sound Law and Analogy: Papers in Honor of Robert S.P. Beekes on the Occasion of His 60th Birthday, ed. Alexander Lubotsky. Amsterdam–Atlanta: Rodopi, pp. 293–316.
- 1998: “The British word for ‘fox’ and its Indo-European origins”, JIES 26: 421–434.
- 1999:
  - “Vedic gr̥bhṇā́ti, gr̥bhāyáti and the semantics of *ye- derivatives of nasal presents”, Münchener Studien zur Sprachwissenschaft 59: 115–162.
  - “Vowel rounding by Primitive Irish labiovelars”, Ériu 50: 133–137.
  - “On henbane and early European narcotics”, Zeitschrift für celtische Philologie 51: 17–45.
  - “The Celtic contribution to the development of the North Sea Germanic vowel system, with special reference to Coastal Dutch”, NOWELE 35: 3–47.
- 2001: “Lost languages in Northern Europe”, in Early Contacts Between Uralic and Indo-European: Linguistic and Archaeological Considerations, eds. C. Carpelan, A. Parpola & P. Koskikallio. Helsinki: Mémoires de la Société Finno-Ougrienne: 417–425.
- 2002: “The Rise and Fall of British Latin: Evidence from English and Brittonic”, in The Celtic Roots of English, eds. Markkuu Filppula, Juhani Klemola, & Heli Pitkänen. Joensuu: University of Joensuu, Faculty of Humanities, pp. 87–110.
- 2003:
  - “Athematic i-presents: the Italic and Celtic evidence”, Incontri Linguistici 26: 59–86.
  - “The etymology of Welsh chwith and the semantics and etymology of PIE *k^{(}ʷ^{)}sweibʰ-”, Yr Hen Iaith: Studies in Early Welsh, ed. P. Russell. Aberystwyth: 1–23.
- 2004:
  - “Indo-European *smer- in Greek and Celtic”, in Indo-European perspectives: Studies in honour of Anna Morpurgo Davies, ed. J. Penney. Oxford: Oxford University Press, 292–299.
  - “Apes, dwarfs, rivers and Indo-European Internal Derivation”, in Per aspera ad asteriscos: Studia Indogermanica in honorem Jens Elmegård Rasmussen sexagenarii Idibus Martiis anno MMIV, eds. Adam Hyllested, Anders Richardt Jørgensen, Jenny Helena Larsson, & Thomas Olander. Innsbruck: Institut für Sprachwissenschaft der Universität Innsbruck, pp. 507–511.
  - “Der Tod des Festlandkeltischen und die Geburt des Französischen, Niederländischen und Hochdeutschen”, in Sprachtod und Sprachgeburt, eds. Peter Schrijver & Peter-Arnold Mumm. Bremen: Dr. Ute Hempen, pp. 1–20.
- 2005: “Early Celtic diphthongization and the Celtic-Latin interface”, in New Approaches to Celtic Placenames in Ptolemy’s Geography, eds. J. de Hoz, R.L. Luján & Patrick Sims-Williams. Madrid: Ediciones Clásicas, 55–67.
- 2007:
  - “Some common developments of Continental and Insular Celtic”, in Gaulois et celtique continental, eds. Pierre-Yves Lambert & Georges-Jean Pinault. Geneva: Droz, 357–371.
  - “What Britons spoke around 400 AD”, in Britons in Anglo-Saxon England, ed. N. J. Higham. Woodbridge: Boydell, 2007, pp. 165–71.
- 2009: “Celtic influence on Old English: Phonological and phonetic evidence”, English Language and Linguistics 13, no. 2 (2009): 193–211.
- 2011: Brythonic Celtic—Britannisches Keltisch: From Medieval British to Modern Breton, ed. Elmar Ternes. Bremen: Hempen Verlag.
  - “Old British”, 1–85.
  - “Middle Breton”, 358–429.
- 2015:
  - “Pruners and trainers of the Celtic family tree: The rise and development of Celtic in the light of language contact”, in Proceedings of the XIV International Congress of Celtic Studies Maynooth 2011. Eds. Liam Breatnach, Ruairí Ó hUiginn, Damian McManus, & Katherine Simms. Dublin: Dublin Institute for Advanced Studies, 2015, pp. 191–219.
  - “Recognizing prehistoric sound change caused by language contact: The rise of Irish (c. 100–600 AD)”. Handout from the workshop ‘Managing multilingualism: Contact, attitudes and planning in historical contexts’ at the 48th Annual Meeting of the Societas Linguistica Europaea, Leiden University, 2–5 September 2015.

=== Reviews ===
- 2003: Review of UCLA Indo-European Studies Volume 1, edited by Brent Vine & Vyacheslav V. Ivanov, Kratylos 48: 89–93.
- 2006: Review of Veni Vidi Vici: Die Vorgeschichte des lateinischen Perfektsystems, by Gerhard Meiser, Kratylos 51: 46–64.
