= Language Contact and the Origins of the Germanic Languages =

2014 book by Peter Schrijver

- Author: Peter Schrijver
- Language: English
- Subject: Linguistics
- Publication date: 2014
- Media type: Hardcover, paperback, ebook
- ISBN: 978-0-415-35548-3 (Hardcover)

Language Contact and the Origins of the Germanic Languages is a 2014 scholarly book by the Dutch linguist Peter Schrijver, published by Routledge.

== Summary ==
Chapter 1 starts from the observation that recent work on contact linguistics in well understood social contexts provides a new platform for trying to use evidence for historical language change as evidence for past social contexts and interactions. It emphasises the role of human social interactions in language change, rather than viewing language change as happening abstractly outside human interactions. A key premise is that people often adopt a new language because it is socially expedient to do so, but learn it with an accent determined by their native language. In some circumstances, this can lead to the pronunciation of the expanding language to change among all its speakers. A simple way to put many of Schrijver's arguments is to say that different Germanic dialects came to be spoken with the foreign accents of people who switched language to Germanic: thus Old English came to be characterised by a British Celtic accent, Old High German by a late Latin accent, and so forth.

The book focuses on the history of the Germanic languages but discusses the Finnic languages, Romance languages and Celtic languages extensively. Compared with other academic studies in historical linguistics, it is written in a usually plain and accessible style.

Chapter 2, 'The Rise of English', focuses on the much debated question of whether English, and particularly Old English, shows any sign of contact between the West Germanic-speaking immigrants who became the Anglo-Saxons and the speakers of British Celtic and Latin whom these immigrants encountered during the Anglo-Saxon settlement of Britain around the fifth century CE. The chapter argues that Middle English betrays the belated appearance of contact features, which had been previously obscured by the literary conservatism of Anglo-Saxon writing, but focuses on Old English phonology. It argues that this contains features strikingly similar to Old Irish (particularly regarding the Old English vowel-changes known as 'i-umlaut' and 'breaking'), and that in these respects Old Irish may provide good evidence for the kind of Celtic spoken in south-eastern Roman Britain at the time of the Anglo-Saxon settlements. Thus it argues that Old English does show Celtic influence.

On the way, Chapter 2 also argues that a Latin-speaking elite fled southern Britain to the northern and eastern uplands, and that their imperfect adoption of British Celtic there helps to explain the dramatic changes apparent in the medieval Brittonic languages, and to explain why those changes were so similar to the changes Latin underwent as it became the Romance languages. It further suggests that Brittonic and Irish began to diverge only around the first century AD, and accordingly that the language that became Irish only came to Ireland at that time (perhaps due to migrations prompted by the Roman conquest of Britain). In this reading, the rapid changes undergone by Irish around the fifth to sixth centuries also reflected the adoption of the language by speakers of Ireland's former language (which is known to have given Irish some loan-words but is otherwise now lost).

Chapter 3, 'The Origin of High German', focuses on the High German consonant shift. It argues that the way the shift manifested in Old Low Franconian in the Rhineland and in Langobardic in Italy is so similar to the manifestation of affrication in Late Spoken Latin in those areas that there must be a causal connection. Thus the chapter argues that the shift reflects Latin-speakers switching to German and carrying features of their own pronunciation over to it. The change then spread to other High German-speaking regions, being simplified and extended in the process.

Chapter 4, 'The Origins of Dutch' argues that several developments distinctive to Western Dutch—particularly the dialectally complex frontings of various vowels—also arose from contact with Old French as Dutch expanded into previously Romance-speaking regions.

Chapter 5, 'Beginnings', considers the origin of the Germanic languages themselves, addressing how Common Germanic came to emerge from its Indo-European ancestor. Germanic loanwords show that the Finnic languages were heavily influenced by Germanic at an early stage, and Schrijver argues that key developments in the Germanic consonant system arose by Finnic-speakers in the southern Baltic region transferring aspects of their native sound-system to Germanic. Thus Schrijver sees the rhythmic consonant gradation distinctive to the Uralic languages that include Finnic being the underlying cause of the Germanic sound-change described by Verner's law, and even speculates that the first Germanic consonant shift was triggered by native Finnic-speakers' inability to cope with the difference between voiced and voiceless plosives in the language that became Germanic.

The chapter also examines how the changes to the low vowels ā, ō and ǣ which marked the divergence of both North Germanic and West Germanic from Common Germanic have surprising parallels in the development of the Saami languages. None of these languages seems likely as the source of these changes to the others. Since Saami is known to have borrowed many words from a language now lost as Saami culture spread northwards into Scandinavia, Schrijver argues that Saami, West Germanic and North Germanic were all affected in similar ways by contact with a language or group of languages which 'shared a peculiar vowel system, whose features were impressed on North and West Germanic as well as Saami' (p. 194).

== Reviews ==
- Ronan, Patricia, in: Kelten: Mededelingen van de Stichting A. G. van Hamel voor Keltische Studies, 68 (November 2015)

Schrijver's ideas, many of which appeared in the form of articles prior to the publication of the book, have been the focus of fairly extensive academic discussion.
