= Old English phonology =

Pronunciation and sounds of Old English

Old English phonology is the pronunciation system of Old English, the Germanic language spoken on Great Britain from around 450 to 1150 and attested in a body of written texts from the 7th–12th centuries. Its reconstruction is necessarily somewhat speculative, but features of Old English pronunciation have been inferred based on the sounds used in modern varieties of English (including dialects), the spellings used in Old English literature, analysis of Old English poetry, and comparison with other Germanic languages.

Some words were pronounced differently in different dialects of Old English. The dialect called West Saxon is the best documented in surviving texts, and so is commonly treated as a default reference in descriptions of Old English, even though it is not a direct ancestor of the modern English language (which is more closely related to the Mercian dialect).

Old English had a distinction between short and long (doubled) consonants, at least between vowels (as seen in sunne "sun" and sunu "son", stellan "to put" and stelan "to steal"), and a distinction between short vowels and long vowels in stressed syllables. It had a larger number of vowel qualities in stressed syllables (/i y u e o æ ɑ/ and in some dialects /ø/) than in unstressed ones (/ɑ e u/). It had diphthongs that no longer exist in Modern English (such as /eo æɑ/), with both short and long versions.

== Consonants ==
The inventory of consonant surface sounds (whether allophones or phonemes) of Old English is shown below. Allophones are enclosed in parentheses.

Consonants
	Labial	Dental	Alveolar	Palatal	Velar	Glottal
Nasal	m		(n̥) n		(ŋ)	
Stop	p b		t d	tʃ (dʒ)^{1}	k (ɡ)	
Fricative	f (v)	θ (ð)	s (z)	ʃ^{1} (ç)	x ɣ	(h)
Lateral			(l̥) l			
Approximant			(r̥) r^{2}	j	(ʍ) w^{3}	

Notes:

^{1} [tʃ dʒ ʃ] are categorized as palatal by Minkova 2014, §4.1.1, as postalveolar by Ringe & Taylor 2014, p. 3.
^{2} /r/ is categorized as alveolar by Minkova 2014, §4.1.1, as postalveolar by Ringe & Taylor 2014, p. 3.
^{3} /w/ is categorized as labial by Minkova 2014, §4.1.1, as round velar by Ringe & Taylor 2014, p. 3.

The following consonants were generally both spelled and pronounced approximately as in modern English: /m n p b t d l/. Others are described at Help:IPA/Old English and discussed below.

=== Gemination ===
Old English had a contrast between short and long consonant sounds. For example, short /n/ in banan 'slayers' was distinguished from long /nn/ in bannan 'summon'. Long consonants were written with double consonant letters. Long consonants are also called geminate consonants (or just "geminates") from the Latin word geminus 'twin, double'.

Geminate consonants could occur only in certain positions in a word. They were typically found in the middle of a word after a stressed short vowel and before a vowel or sonorant, as in cynnes 'kin' (genitive) or bettra 'better'. In pronunciation, they were split between the preceding and following syllable, as in pyffan [pyf.fɑn] 'puff' and dogga [doɡ.ɡɑ] 'dog'.

Geminates were shortened next to other consonants, at the end of a word, or after an unstressed vowel. In writing, however, double consonant letters were sometimes used in these contexts by analogy to inflected forms, or as etymological spellings. It is likely that early on, short and long consonants did contrast in word-final position, but even early texts show variation in spelling in this position: e.g. between bedd and bed 'bed', pronounced something like /bed/.

It appears that geminate consonants could cause a preceding long vowel to be shortened, although this change may have been sporadic or the long vowel may have been subject to analogical restoration in some cases. (Note: Pre-geminate shortening is seen in the Mercian/Northumbrian form ⟨enne⟩ for the masculine accusative singular of ān 'one', since raising of ⟨æ⟩ to ⟨e⟩ specifically affected short /æ/. However, in Early West Saxon, the same form is spelled ⟨anne⟩ or ⟨ænne⟩, which indicate a pronunciation ānne or ǣnne with a long vowel restored through leveling. In Kentish the form ⟨sioþþan⟩ 'since' is attested, where the sound change of back umlaut shows that the vowel was short; in contrast, it is unclear whether the spelling ⟨siþþan⟩ indicates a short vowel or a long vowel restored by analogy.)

The short-long contrast was distinctive for most consonant phonemes. Minimal pairs can be cited for long and short /p t k tʃ d θ s m n l r/, and also for /ɣ/ and /j/ assuming that phonetic [ɡɡ], [ddʒ] are phonemically analyzed as /ɣɣ/, /jj/. Sometimes [j] and [(d)dʒ] are instead analyzed as separate phonemes, in which case neither has a distinctive length contrast. The affricate [dʒ] was always phonetically long between vowels; it could also occur after /n/ or at the end of a word. There seems to have been no merge between [dʒ] and [j] at the end of a word, so there was a distinction in pronunciation between weġ 'way', pronounced [wej], and weċġ 'wedge', pronounced [wedːʒ] or [wedʒ]. (Note: Historically, intervocalic [ddʒ] developed from the palatalization and gemination of Proto-Germanic *ɡj (e.g. Proto-Germanic *aɡjō 'edge' > Proto-West-Germanic *aɡʲɡʲu > Old English eċġ, pronounced [ˈedʒ]), whereas short [j] in Old English comes either from Proto-Germanic *j, or from Proto-Germanic singleton *g when palatalized by an adjacent front vowel. Proto-Germanic geminate *jj was changed in Proto-West-Germanic into /j/ preceded by a diphthong (e.g. Proto-Germanic *ajją 'egg' > Proto-West-Germanic *aij > Old English ǣġ, pronounced [ˈæːj]).) The approximant /w/ was always short. (Note: Proto-Germanic geminate *ww was changed in Proto-West-Germanic into singleton /w/ preceded by a diphthong: for example, Proto-Germanic *hawwaną 'to chop' became Proto-West-Germanic *hauwan, which became Old English hēawan, pronounced [ˈhæ͞ɑwɑn].) The fricative /f/ could be short or long, but geminate /ff/ was fairly marginal. In the context of verb conjugation, intervocalic singleton /f/ often originated from Proto-Germanic *b and showed alternation with the geminate /bb/. The change of intervocalic *b to /f/ had the effect of eliminating former minimal pairs between /b/ versus /bb/. The fricative /x/ (spelled ⟨h⟩) came to be lost when single between voiced sounds: since only long /xx/ remained in this position (in words such as hlihhan, hweohhol), its length was no longer contrastive. Spellings with single ⟨h⟩ for original /xx/ are sometimes seen, e.g. hlæhað, croha. Length was not distinctive for the phoneme /ʃ/, which originated from a cluster and was probably always phonetically long [ʃʃ] when it came between vowels within a word, and phonetically short [ʃ] in word-initial or word-final position.

=== Fricative voicing ===
The three phonemes /f θ s/, which all belong to the phonetic category of fricatives, had different pronunciations depending on the context (allophones). One set of allophones, transcribed as [f θ s], were phonetically voiceless. The other set of allophones, transcribed as [v ð z], were phonetically voiced. The difference between [f θ s] and [v ð z] was generally not marked in Old English spelling. The sounds [f v] were both written with the letter ⟨f⟩, the sounds [s z] were both written with the letter ⟨s⟩, and the sounds [θ ð] were both written with the letters ⟨ð⟩ and ⟨þ⟩. (Both ⟨ð⟩ and ⟨þ⟩ could represent either the voiceless or voiced version of the phoneme /θ/: the two letters were not used in Old English to distinguish between the allophones [θ ð].) However, certain alternative spellings existed for some sounds (e.g. [v] was sometimes written ⟨u⟩, as in Latin).

The pronunciation of /f θ s/ as [f θ s] versus [v ð z] was generally predictable from context. The voiced allophones [v ð z] were used between voiced sounds (between vowels, between a vowel and a voiced consonant, or between voiced consonants) so long as the immediately preceding syllable had some degree of stress. For example, the phoneme /θ/ was pronounced as the voiced sound [ð] in the words eorðe 'earth' and fæþm 'fathom', which can be phonemically transcibed as /ˈe͝orθe/, /ˈfæθm/ and phonetically transcribed as [ˈe͝orðe], [ˈfæðm]. The voiceless allophones [f θ s] were used next to voiceless consonants, at the beginning (Note: Although the consensus view is that word-initial ⟨f þ~ð s⟩ were pronounced as voiceless [f θ s], Lass 1991–1993 considers it probable that word-initial ⟨f þ~ð s⟩ were pronounced as [v ð z] in at least some accents of Old English (suggesting this occurred in West Saxon, Kentish, and West Mercian, but not in East Mercian or Northumbrian). A change of word-initial /f θ s/ to voiced [v ð z] is seen in some dialects of Middle English and also in some continental Germanic languages, such as Dutch and High German (although not in Frisian). Lass argues it is unlikely that this change occurred multiple times independently, and so concludes that word-initial [v ð z] were likely present in Old English, even if there is not unambiguous written evidence of this pronunciation feature until Middle English.) and end of words, after unstressed syllables, and at the start of the second elements of compound words.

In accordance with these rules, the allophones [f θ s] and [v ð z] alternated in many pairs of related words or word-forms, such as the following:

Fricative voicing alternations
Phoneme	/f/		/θ/		/s/	
Allophone	[f]	[v]	[θ]	[ð]	[s]	[z]
Example word	ċealf	ċealfru	smiþ	smiþas	hūs	hūsian
Phonemic transcription	/tʃæ͝ɑlf/	/ˈtʃæ͝ɑlfru/	/smiθ/	/ˈsmiθɑs/	/ˈxuːs/	/ˈxuːsiɑn/
Phonetic transcription	[tʃæ͝ɑɫf]	[ˈtʃæ͝ɑɫvru]	[smiθ]	[ˈsmiðɑs]	[ˈhuːs]	[ˈhuːziɑn]
Translation	'calf, young cow'	'calves'	'blacksmith'	'blacksmiths'	'house' (noun)	'to house'

==== Exceptions to voicing ====
There may have been some exceptions to the distribution of [f θ s] and [v ð z] according to these rules.

One category of potential exceptions is words where the fricative originally stood after an unstressed vowel, but the vowel was lost (a sound change called syncope). Examples include the Old English words strengþu 'strength' and hālsian 'to take an oath', from Proto-West-Germanic *strangiþu and *hailisōn, with loss of the medial unstressed vowel *-i-. These words may have been pronounced [ˈstreŋɡθu] and [ˈhɑːlsiɑn], with voiceless [θ] and [s].

- A piece of evidence for fricatives being voiceless in this context is the verb blētsian 'to bless', which contains the same suffix -sian attached to the root of blōd 'blood'. The replacement of voiced [d] with voiceless [t] suggests that ⟨s⟩ in this word was a phonetically voiceless sound.
- On the other hand, there is evidence that some word-medial fricatives did become voiced after syncope. Old English anfilt(e) or anfealt evolved from Proto-West-Germanic *anafalt-, and Old English sīþe evolved from Proto-West-Germanic *sigiþī, with loss of the unstressed vowels *-a- and *-i- respectively. The modern English forms of these words, anvil and scythe, are pronounced with the voiced fricative sounds [v] and [ð].

Another category of potential exceptions is words where original geminate /ss/ became shortened, such as cærse (derived from *cræsse by metathesis of /ræ/ to /ær/).

Despite the evidence for some exceptions to the voicing of word-medial /f θ s/ to [v ð z] in Old English, it is not clear that voiced and voiceless fricatives contrasted in this context. Some scholars have argued that the contrast had already become phonemic (if marginally so) in Old English whereas Minkova 2011, citing the absence of minimal pairs, argues that they were not lexically contrastive segments and so should be analyzed as allophones during Old English, even if their distribution was not determined solely by phonology.

The Old English fricative voicing rule did not apply to the fricatives /x/ (spelled ⟨h⟩) or /ʃ/ (spelled ⟨sc⟩, often written ⟨sċ⟩ in modern editions).

- In contexts where other fricatives became voiced, Proto-Germanic *x came to be lost entirely in Old English, though before it was lost it caused certain sound changes such as breaking of preceding vowels. Old English did possess a voiced velar fricative sound [ɣ], which developed from Proto-Germanic *ɡ, but [ɣ] is usually analyzed as a separate phoneme from /x/: the sounds were normally distinguished in spelling, with [ɣ] written as ⟨g⟩ and /x/ as ⟨h⟩, although some unetymological interchange of these spellings occurs, especially in word-final position (where the sounds seem to have merged into one phoneme by late Old English). The fricative [ɣ] seems to have instead been phonemically identified in Old English with the plosive [ɡ], also written ⟨g⟩.
- The fricative /ʃ/ developed later than other fricative sounds, as it evolved from the West Germanic cluster /sk/. It is likely that sċ was pronounced as geminate [ʃʃ] between vowels, and possibly also at the end of a word after a short vowel. In Old English poetry, ⟨sc⟩ between vowels seems to have been treated metrically like a cluster rather than like a single consonant.

==== Origins of /f, θ, s/ ====
The Old English phoneme /f/ descended in some cases from Proto-Germanic *f, which became [v] between voiced sounds as described above. But /f/ also had another source. In the middle or at the end of words, Old English /f/ was often derived from Proto-Germanic *[β] (also written *ƀ), a fricative allophone of the phoneme *b. Proto-Germanic *b became Old English /b/ only at the start of a word, after [m], or when geminated. In other contexts, it became Old English /f/, pronounced either as [v] or [f] based on its position (the originally voiced fricative was devoiced before voiceless sounds or in final position):

- PG *stabaz [ˈstɑβɑz] > OE stæf /ˈstæf/
- PG *habdē > OE hæfde [ˈhævde] 'had', but PG *habjaną > OE habban [ˈhɑbbɑn] 'to have'

In contrast, the Old English phonemes /θ/ and /s/ generally descend only from Proto-Germanic voiceless *θ and *s. Proto-Germanic *[ð] (a fricative allophone of *d, sometimes derived by voicing of *θ in the context of Verner's Law) regularly developed in all positions into the Old English stop /d/, as in fæder /ˈfæder/ from Proto-Germanic *fadēr [ˈɸɑðɛːr]. Proto-Germanic *z (which existed only as the Verner's Law counterpart of *s) regularly developed to Old English /r/ (a sound change called rhotacism). As a result, some Old English verbs show alternations between /θ/ [θ~ð] and /d/ or between /s/ [s~z] and /r/, although in others this alternation was leveled, resulting in /θ/ [θ~ð] or /s/ [s~z] throughout.

Examples of Old English verbs that retained inherited /θ/–/d/ or /s/–/r/ alternations:

- snīþan, snāþ, snidon, sniden /ˈsniːθɑn, ˈsnɑːθ, ˈsnidon, ˈsniden/ [ˈsniːðɑn, ˈsnɑːθ, ˈsnidon, ˈsniden] from Proto-Germanic: *snīθaną, *snaiθ, *snidun, *snidanaz 'cut'
- frēosan, frēas, fruron, froren /ˈfre͞osɑn, ˈfræ͞ɑs, ˈfruron, ˈfroren/ [ˈfre͞ozɑn, ˈfræ͞ɑs, ˈfruron, ˈfroren] from Proto-Germanic: *freusaną, *fraus, *fruzun, *fruzanaz 'freeze'

Examples of Old English verbs that leveled the consonant to only /θ/ or only /s/:

- wrīþan, wrāþ, wriþon, wriþen /ˈwriːθɑn, ˈwrɑːθ, ˈwriθon, ˈwriθen/ [ˈwriːðɑn, ˈwrɑːθ, ˈwriðon, ˈwriðen], versus Proto-Germanic: *wrīθaną, *wraiθ, *wridun, *wridanaz 'wrap, twist'
- lesan, læs, lǣson, lesen /ˈlesɑn, ˈlæs, ˈlæːson, ˈlesen/ [ˈlezɑn, ˈlæs, ˈlæːzon, ˈlezen], versus Proto-Germanic: *lesaną, *las, *lēzun, *lezanaz 'gather'

=== Velar consonants ===
The voiceless velar plosive [k] was typically spelled ⟨c⟩. The sound [k] alternated in some circumstances with the voiceless palatal affricate [tʃ], also spelled ⟨c⟩.

The voiced velar plosive [ɡ] and fricative [ɣ] were both typically spelled ⟨g⟩ and can be analyzed as allophones of a single phoneme. In early Old English, the plosive [ɡ] was used only in two contexts: after /n/, as in singan 'sing', or as part of the geminate [ɡɡ], as in frogga 'frog' (also written frocga). (Geminate [ɡɡ] was uncommon, because West Germanic gemination caused palatalization of original velar consonants.) In later Old English (possibly after around 950 or 1000 AD), [ɡ] was also used in a third context: at the start of a word, or at the start of a morpheme in compound or prefixed words. In contrast, early Old English is believed to have used [ɣ] in word-initial position. In both early and late Old English, [ɣ] was used medially after vowels or after consonants other than /n/. The sounds [ɡ] and [ɣ] were mostly in complementary distribution. However, either sound could occur after /n/, since phonetic [nɣ] occurred as the result of syncope in some words such as syngian. The phonemic transcription used in this article ignores such exceptional cases and treats [ɣ] and [ɡ] as allophones of a phoneme /ɣ/. As with ⟨c⟩, the letter ⟨g⟩ in Old English represented not only velar but also palatal consonant sounds: [ɣ] had a palatal counterpart [j] and [ɡ] had a palatal counterpart [dʒ], described in the following section.

The voiceless glottal fricative [h] and voiceless velar fricative [x] were both typically spelled ⟨h⟩ and are generally considered allophones of a single phoneme, which can be analyzed as /x/, at least in early Old English. The glottal allophone [h] was used at the start of a word, or at the start of a morpheme in compound or prefixed words. For example, the words hund 'dog' and ġehālgian 'to hallow' can be transcribed phonetically as [ˈhund], [jeˈhɑːɫɣiɑn], phonemically as /ˈxund/, /jeˈxɑːlɣiɑn/. The velar allophone [x] was used at the end of a syllable (by itself or in clusters with other consonants) or as part of the geminate [xx]. This phoneme is often assumed to have had a third allophone, a voiceless palatal fricative [ç], used after front vowels (or possibly only after stressed front vowels). For example, cniht ('boy') /knixt/, may have been phonetically realized as [kniçt]. (Note: The use of the sound [ç] after front vowels is supported by developments in English pronunciation seen from the thirteenth century onward: original /x/ sometimes became /f/ after a back vowel (e.g. rough, tough, trough), but this change is never seen after a front vowel. That is explained if the allophone [x] sometimes became [f], but the allophone [ç] never did so. Lass 1994 considers it uncertain that [ç] was used already in Old English, whereas Hogg 1992 regards it as certain that ⟨h⟩ had developed a palatal version, like other velar consonants.)

The consonants /ɣ/ and /x/ are analyzed as separate phonemes in at least the early stages of Old English, because it appears that they originally stood in direct contrast at the start of a word (as in [ɣoːd] gōd 'good' vs. [hoːd] hōd 'hood') or at the end of a word (as in [læ͞ɑɣ] lēag 'lye' vs. [læ͞ɑx] lēah 'clearing, meadow'). However, the contrast between /ɣ/ and /x/ was reduced by certain sound changes in some later varieties of Old English.

- Word-final /ɣ/ and /x/ eventually merged in some dialects. This is shown by spellings with ⟨h⟩ for words that originally ended with /ɣ/, as well as some "inverted" spellings with final ⟨g⟩ for words that originally ended with /x/. Such spellings occur regularly in Late West Saxon, and in Kentish texts from around 900 onwards, suggesting both sounds had come to be pronounced [x] in this position (compare the devoicing of final /f/). They are not attested in older Kentish charters, and are seen only occasionally in Early West Saxon. Spellings with ⟨h⟩ for original /ɣ/ are comparatively rare in Anglian dialects, with hardly any clear examples in Northumbrian texts.
- Word-medial /x/ was lost early on between voiced sounds. After this sound change, there was no direct contrast between /ɣ/ and /x/ in this position. In the same dialects where final /ɣ/ came to be spelled with ⟨h⟩, there are occasional examples of word-medial /ɣ/ being written with ⟨h⟩: for example, ⟨fuhlas⟩ for fuglas. Spellings like this have been interpreted as evidence that /ɣ/ could be devoiced to [x] in syllable-final, as well as in word-final position. Alternatively, the voiced sound [ɣ] may have been written ⟨h⟩ here by analogy to the interchangeable use of the spellings ⟨h⟩ and ⟨g⟩ in word-final position. In support of the latter interpretation, Fulk 2002 points out examples of ⟨h⟩ being used in place of medial ⟨g⟩ at the start of a word-medial syllable, such as ⟨dahum, sorhe⟩ for dagum, sorge.

It is possible that medial [ɣ] became reanalyzed as an allophone of /x/ after the sound changes described above. In Late West Saxon texts, ⟨g⟩ and ⟨h⟩ were in complementary distribution everywhere except for at the start of a word. Word-initial [ɣ] never merged with /x/ [h], but the eventual replacement of word-initial [ɣ] with the plosive [ɡ] might have been a consequence of the sound becoming phonemically reanalyzed as /ɡ/ in this position.

A morphological contrast is seen between inflected forms with medial -⟨g⟩- [ɣ], and forms that show contraction of adjacent vowels after the loss of original intervocalic [x] or [h]. These alternate in certain classes of strong verbs as a result of Verner's Law: an example is the strong class 6 infinitive slēan (from Proto-West Germanic *slahan) versus the corresponding plural past form slōgon (from Proto-West Germanic *slōgun).

The inflectional paradigms of some words show alternation between [ɣ], [j], and [x] as a result of devoicing and palatalization:

- dæġ ('day') [ˈdæj], dæġes (gen.sg) [ˈdæjes] vs. dagas (nom.pl) [ˈdɑɣɑs] (also dagung ('dawn') [ˈdɑɣuŋɡ])
- burg, burh ('castle') /burɣ/ > [burx], vs. burgum (dat.pl) [ˈburɣum], vs. byrġ (nom.pl) [ˈbyrj] (Note: In West Saxon, an epenthetic vowel could be inserted to separate clusters of a consonant + [j] or [w] if the preceding vowel was short; hence forms such as byrġ, bylġ, herġas varied with byriġ (or byri), byliġ, heriġas.)

Distribution of consonant phones written with ⟨h⟩ and ⟨g⟩
Position		Phone					
Position		[h]	[x]	[ɣ]	[ɡ]	[j]	[dʒ]
Initial onset		hōd [hoːd]	-	gāt [ˈɣɑːt], later [ˈɡɑːt]		ġēar [ˈjæ͞ɑr]	-
Medial onset	After a vowel	(swehoras* (Note: Spellings showing retention of medial [h] between voiced sounds can be found only in the earliest texts.))	-	dagas /ˈdɑ.ɣɑs/	-	dæġes [ˈdæ.jes]	-
Medial onset	After /r/ or /l/	(furhum*)	-	burga [ˈbur.ɣa]	-	herġa [ˈher.ja]	-
Medial onset	After /n/	-	-	syngian [ˈsyn.ɣi.ɑn]	þingian [ˈθiŋ.ɡi.ɑn]	menġu [ˈmen.ju]	menġan [ˈmen.dʒɑn]
Medial onset	Geminate	-	pohha [ˈpox.xɑ]	-	frogga [ˈfroɡ.ɡɑ]	-	seċġan [ˈsed.dʒɑn]
Final coda	After a vowel	-	nēah [ˈnæ͞ɑx]	bēag [ˈbæ͞ɑɣ]* (Note: In dialects without devoicing of final [ɣ] to [x].)	-	weġ [ˈwej]	weċġ [ˈwedʒ]
Final coda	After /r/ or /l/	-	seolh [ˈse͝olx]	burg [ˈburɣ]*	-	byrġ [ˈbyrj]	-
Final coda	After /n/	-	-	-	sang [ˈsɒŋɡ]	-	lenġ [ˈlendʒ]

=== Palatal consonants ===
The palatal consonants [tʃ, dʒ, j, ʃ] were represented in Old English spelling with the same letters as velar consonants or clusters [k, ɡ, ɣ, sk]:

- ⟨c⟩ represented either palatal [tʃ] or velar [k].
- ⟨g⟩ represented either palatal [j] or velar [ɣ]. After the letter ⟨n⟩, it usually represented palatal [dʒ] or velar [ɡ].
- ⟨cg⟩ or ⟨gg⟩ represented double consonants between vowels: either palatal [ddʒ] or (rarely) velar [ɡɡ].
- ⟨sc⟩ represented either palatal [ʃ] or velar [sk].

Modern editors may mark the palatal consonants with a dot above the letter: ⟨ċ⟩, ⟨ġ⟩, ⟨sċ⟩. Historically, [tʃ, ʃ, dʒ] developed from [k, sk, ɡ] by palatalization. Some cases of [j] developed from palatalization of [ɣ], while others developed from Proto-Germanic *j. Even though palatalization was originally a regular sound change, later sound changes and borrowings meant that the occurrence of the palatal forms was no longer predictable. (Note: Note that Old English had palatalized ⟨g⟩ in certain words that have hard G in Modern English because of Old Norse influence such as ġiefan "give" and ġeat "gate".) Thus, palatal and velar consonants eventually became separate phonemes. But it is debated when the contrast became phonemic, and when the palatal counterparts of [k ɡ] evolved to affricates [tʃ dʒ] as opposed to palatal plosives [c ɟ]. The forms ⟨orcgeard⟩ and ⟨feccan⟩, attested around 900 AD as unetymological spellings of original ortġeard and fetian, are commonly interpreted as evidence that palatal ċ had become an affricate [tʃ], as it is assumed that these words underwent a change of [tj] to [tʃ]. However, because palatal ċ and velar c alliterate in English poetry up through at least the late tenth century, Minkova 2014 assumes that they were still allophones of a single phoneme before 1000. Likewise, word-initial palatal ġ and velar g alliterate with each other in early Old English verse (before the latter changed to [ɡ], circa 950 AD), which Minkova 2014 interprets as evidence that [j] and [ɣ] constituted allophones at this point in time, despite the existence of /j/ from Proto-Germanic. Lass 1994 assumes that [j], [ɣ] and [ɡ] were all allophones of a phoneme /ɡ/ at one point during the history of Old English.

Palatalized ⟨sċ⟩, according to Minkova 2014, may have still been pronounced as a cluster [sc] rather than as a unitary consonant [ʃ] in some dialects at the end of Old English. Ringe & Taylor 2014 state that palatalized ⟨sċ⟩ was initially pronounced as [sc] or [sʲc], but this coalesced to [ʃ] (or [ʃː] after a short vowel) by some point during the 10th century.

The distribution of velar and palatal consonants is described below.

Distribution of [k tʃ ɣ~ɡ j ʃ] before vowels
consonant	stressed vowel											unstressed vowel		
consonant	a	o	u	æ	e	y	ea	i	eo	ie	io	a	o/u	e/i
c/ċ	k			k, tʃ			tʃ (k)	tʃ				k, tʃ		
g/ġ	ɣ~ɡ, j						j (ɣ~ɡ)	j				ɣ~ɡ, j		
sc/sċ	ʃ											ʃ, sk		

- ⟨sc⟩ is always palatal [ʃ] at the start of a stressed syllable. Before a back vowel, the letter ⟨e⟩ is variably written as a diacritic after word-initial ⟨sc⟩ to indicate its palatal quality: e.g. /ˈʃort/ is spelled either ⟨scort⟩ or ⟨sceort⟩, /ˈʃɑkɑn/ is spelled either ⟨scacan⟩ or ⟨sceacan⟩.
- ⟨c g⟩ are always palatal [tʃ j] before stressed ⟨i eo ie io⟩, and also before ⟨ea⟩ in most dialects; however, in Mercian, velar cea, gea can be found in words that underwent second fronting of stressed ă to æ̆, followed by back umlaut (e.g. Mercian geatu = West Saxon gatu).
- Before stressed ⟨a o u⟩, ⟨c⟩ is always velar [k], and ⟨g⟩ is usually velar [ɣ~ɡ]. Palatal [j] can occur before a stressed back vowel in words such as /junɡ/ 'young' (which had /j/ originally in Proto-Germanic): this could be spelled ⟨gung⟩, but spellings with initial ⟨i⟩, ⟨gi⟩ or ⟨ge⟩ are often seen instead, such as ⟨iung giung giong geong⟩. Some scholars interpret spellings like ⟨geong⟩ as evidence that an epenthetic glide developed between the palatal consonant and the following back vowel, whereas others interpret ⟨ge⟩ in this context as a diacritic spelling where ⟨e⟩ simply marks the palatal value of the preceding consonant letter.
- Before stressed ⟨æ e y⟩, ⟨c g⟩ are velar [k ɣ~ɡ] in cases where the vowel developed by i-umlaut of a back vowel: e.g. cǣġ, gēs, gylden, cȳþan. (The i-umlaut of original /ju/ seems to have become unrounded early on, e.g ġingra.) Palatal ċæ, ġæ, ċe, ġe are typically not found in stressed syllables in Early West Saxon, since palatal diphthongization (traditionally dated before i-umlaut) replaced them with ċea, ġea, ċie, ġie respectively. However, these sequences are attested in some varieties of Old English. Spellings with ⟨cæ, gæ⟩ for original ċæ̆, ġæ̆, such as ċæstre, ġæf, are attested in Anglian, although not universally: such words can also be spelled in Anglian texts with ⟨cea, gea⟩ or ⟨ce, ge⟩, depending on the dialect and time period. In Kentish, palatal diphthongization did not occur, but the vowel æ eventually merged with e: subsequently, either letter could be used regardless of a word's etymology. Thus, spellings such as onċærrende, ċǣses can be found in Kentish charters from the 9th century. Palatal ċe, ġe arose regularly in non-West Saxon dialects in words containing the i-umlaut of ea: e.g. Mercian ċele, Mercian ġerwan, Kentish ġēman = Early West Saxon ċiele, ġierwan, ġīeman. Palatal ċe, ġe can also be found in Late West Saxon texts, which show (somewhat inconsistent) "smoothing" of Early West Saxon ē̆a to ē̆ after a palatal consonant, e.g. ċerf, ġef, ġēr. Mercian texts that exhibit "second fronting" of æ̆ to ĕ may contain ċe, ġe in forms such as ġet, ċester = Early West Saxon ġeat, ċeaster. Palatal diphthongization of e does not seem to have been a consistent sound change outside of West Saxon (though there is some evidence in other dialects of e being raised after palatals in certain words) so there are also examples where e simply represents original /e/, such as Mercian ġeldan = Early West Saxon ġieldan. Palatal ċy, ġy occur in Late West Saxon words where ⟨y⟩ corresponds to Early West Saxon ie: e.g. ġyfu, ġyldan. The letter "y" could also be used in Late West Saxon in place of original i, e.g. in ċyriċe for ċiriċe. After the merger of y, e in Kentish, ⟨y⟩ could be used as a "reverse" spelling for /e/, as in Kentish ċyrð.

Before unstressed vowels, ⟨c g sc⟩ can be palatal or velar depending on etymology. Velar [k ɣ sk] can be found before unstressed back vowels in words such as dīcas, plegode, æscas, whereas palatal [tʃ j ʃ] can be found before unstressed back vowels in words that originally contained an etymological *j or *i after the consonant, such as sēċan, wierġan, wȳsċan from Proto-Germanic *sōkijaną, *wargijaną, *wunskijaną. The letter ⟨e⟩ is variably written as a diacritic between a palatal consonant and a following unstressed ⟨a⟩ or ⟨o⟩ (e.g. sēċean, strenġeo); before unstressed ⟨u⟩, ⟨i⟩ was usually used instead (e.g. drenċium). Velar [k ɣ sk] can be found before an unstressed front vowel in class II weak verbs with an infinitive ending in -ian; e.g. wacian, dagian, āscian. The front vowel /i/ is here derived from umlaut, unrounding, shortening and raising of original -ō-: e.g. Proto-West-Germanic *makōn 'to make' was replaced with *makōjan, which is hypothesized to have developed through *makœ̅jan and *makejan to Old English maci(ġ)an. As seen from these examples, the sounds that etymologically caused palatalization of velar consonants also caused i-umlaut of the vowel in the preceding syllable. However, it is not always possible to predict whether a consonant is velar or palatal from the quality of the preceding vowel: some palatal consonants arose after the vowel ⟨i⟩, which is unchanged by i-umlaut (as in rīċu; contrast strīcan) and for historical reasons, some words developed palatal consonants between two back vowels (as in sċeōġeað /ˈʃoːjɑθ/).

The voiced affricate [dʒ] is found only in restricted contexts: it does not occur at the start of a word, and occurs medially or finally only after a nasal or in contexts where it was (at least originally) geminated. It is nearly in complementary distribution with [j]. However, phonetic [nj] occurs as the result of syncope in some words such as menġu (a syncopated form of meniġu 'many; a multitude'). The transcription in this article ignores such exceptional cases and treats [dʒ] as an allophone of /j/.

- senġan ('to sing') /ˈsenjan/, pronounced [ˈsendʒɑn] (from *sangijan)
- bryċġ ('bridge') /bryjj/, pronounced [bryddʒ] (from *bruggjō < *bruɣjō)

In circumstances where the palatal affricates [tʃ] and [dʒ] came to be followed by another consonant due to syncope of an intervening vowel, they were eventually replaced with the corresponding velar plosives, [k] and [ɡ] respectively. (Ringe & Taylor 2014 assume this replacement occurred before the palatalized variants had developed into affricates. Campbell 1959 assumes that such consonants were never affricated, but transcribes them as palatal in Old English.) The affricates do seem to have been used before other consonants in compound words, e.g. in bryċġ-bōt 'bridge-repairing' and seċġ-lēac 'sedge-leek, rush-garlic'.

=== Sonorants ===
[ŋ] is an allophone of /n/ occurring before [k] and [ɡ]. Words that have final /ŋ/ in standard Modern English have the cluster [ŋɡ] in Old English.

- sincan ('sink') /ˈsinkɑn/, phonetically [ˈsiŋkɑn]
- lang ('long') /ˈlɑnɡ/, phonetically [ˈlɑŋɡ] (or [ˈlɔŋɡ])

The exact nature of Old English /r/ is not known. It may have been an alveolar approximant [ɹ], as in most Modern English accents; an alveolar flap [ɾ]; or an alveolar trill [r].

==== Velarization ====
The consonants /r l/ are thought to have been velarized [rˠ ɫ] before a consonant or when geminate. This is based on the assumption that breaking of short vowels to diphthongs was caused by assimilation to a following velar consonant.

- *lirnian > liornian > leornian [ˈle͝orˠniɑn] ('learn')
- *erþǣ > eorþǣ > eorþe [ˈe͝orˠðe] ('earth')
- *fællan > feallan [ˈfæ͝ɑɫɫɑn] ('to fall')

However, the exact quality of these allophones is disputed. For example, Howell 1991 assumes that breaking before preconsonantal /l/ was caused by velarized [ɫ], but argues that breaking before preconsonantal /r/ was not caused by a velar, uvular or retroflex coarticulation, but instead was an effect of /r/ being weakened in this position to a more vowel-like or approximant sound (as opposed to the trill or tap found in syllable-initial position). Fulk 2014 assumes breaking before Old English /r/ was triggered by a retroflex quality, suggesting its pronunciation was similar to "modern American r after vowels".

Based on phonotactic constraints on initial clusters, Fisiak 1967 proposed interpreting ⟨wr⟩ and ⟨wl⟩ as digraphs representing the velarized sounds in prevocalic position, in which case the distinction would be phonemic, as exhibited by minimal pairs such as wrīdan [ˈrˠiːdɑn] "to grow" vs. rīdan [ˈriːdɑn] "to ride" or wlītan [ˈɫiːtɑn] "to look" vs. lītan [ˈliːtɑn] "to bend". However, this hypothesis is inconsistent with orthoepic and orthographic evidence from the Early Modern English era, as well as borrowings into and from Welsh, which has [wl] and [wr] as genuine initial clusters. Furthermore, in Old English poetry, ⟨wr⟩ and ⟨wl⟩ can alliterate with each other as well as with ⟨w⟩ followed by a vowel, as in "Wēn' ic þæt gē for wlenco, nalles for wræcsīðum" (Beowulf 338).

==== Voiceless sonorants ====
The spellings ⟨hw⟩, ⟨hl⟩, ⟨hn⟩, ⟨hr⟩ probably represented two-phoneme clusters, /xw, xl, xn, xr/, where /x/ was pronounced [h] (its usual allophone in syllable-initial position). In this context, /w, l, n, r/ may have been pronounced as voiceless sonorants [ʍ, l̥, n̥, r̥]. The status of ⟨hw⟩, ⟨hl⟩, ⟨hn⟩, ⟨hr⟩ as clusters rather than unitary segments in Old English phonology is supported by their alliteration in poetry with each other and with prevocalic [h] /x/. Furthermore, the cluster analysis of ⟨hr⟩ is supported by its behavior in the context of metathesis. For example, hræn 'wave, sea' has a variant form hærn, where ⟨h⟩ and ⟨r⟩ are separated, which suggests that the ⟨hr⟩ in hræn was not a single consonant phoneme.

Voiceless sonorant clusters
Word	Phonemic transcription	Phonetic transcription
hwæt ('what')	/xwæt/	[hʍæt]
hlāf ('bread')	/xlɑːf/	[hl̥ɑːf]
hnutu ('nut')	/xnutu/	[hn̥utu]
hrīm ('rime')	/xriːm/	[hr̥iːm]

There is an alternative hypothesis that holds that (at least in later periods) ⟨h⟩ in these sequences was not pronounced as an independent consonant sound, but was only a diacritic marking the voicelessness of the following sonorant. Original /xr, xn, xl/ would merge with plain /r n l/ by early Middle English, with a transitional period from the eleventh century to around the thirteenth century. (Note: Minkova 2003 argues that /xr, xn, xl/ all became simplified over the same time period, and concludes there is no reliable way to order the three changes relative to one another. Some prior scholars have concluded that the merger of /xr/ and /r/ was completed earliest; Goossens 1969 argues it was complete by the middle of the eleventh century, based on frequent interchange of the spellings ⟨hr⟩ and ⟨r⟩ in glosses from that time period. The merger of /xl/ and /l/ may have taken somewhat longer to complete.) Examples of all three mergers are attested in alliterative lines of the Middle English poem Layamon's Brut. The digraphs ⟨rh⟩, ⟨nh⟩ and ⟨lh⟩ are attested to some extent in Middle English texts; e.g. the 12th-century Ormulum contains ⟨rhof⟩ but also includes forms spelled with simple ⟨r⟩. The Ayenbite of Inwyt (written in 1340 by a Kentish English speaker who was probably born during the thirteenth century) contains spellings with ⟨lh⟩ and ⟨nh⟩ alongside spellings with ⟨l⟩ and ⟨n⟩ in words that had hl, hn in Old English.

At least some of these mergers may have begun earlier. Old English scribes occasionally omitted the letter ⟨h⟩ in words starting with these clusters. A merge of the cluster /xw/ with /w/ is also attested in some historical and many current varieties of English, but has still not been completed, as some present-day speakers distinguish the former as [ʍ]. There is evidence of alliteration between ⟨hw⟩ and ⟨w⟩ in some Old English poems.

== Vowels ==
Old English had a moderately large vowel system. In stressed syllables both monophthongs and diphthongs had short and long versions, which were clearly distinguished in pronunciation. In unstressed syllables, the number of vowel contrasts was generally reduced. Historically, unstressed vowels could be elided in some circumstances.

=== Monophthongs ===
Depending on dialect, Old English distinguished five to eight vowel qualities in stressed syllables. Each could appear as a long or a short monophthong. An example of two words distinguished by vowel length is god [god] ('god') versus gōd [goːd] ('good').

Monophthongs in Old English
	Front		Back
	unrounded	rounded	Back
Close	i iː	y yː	u uː
Mid	e eː	(ø øː)	o oː
Open	æ æː		ɑ ɑː

The front mid rounded vowel /ø(ː)/ (spelled usually as ⟨oe⟩) existed only in some dialects; in others, it was unrounded and merged with /e(ː)/ ⟨e⟩. This merger is seen for both the long and short versions of the vowel in West Saxon and Kentish by around 900 AD, and was complete in Late West Saxon. In Anglian dialects long /øː/ generally remains rounded, but short /ø/ exhibits variable unrounding.

In Kentish, the vowels /æ(ː)/ and /y(ː)/ also merged into /e(ː)/ sometime around the 9th century, leaving /e(ː)/ and /i(ː)/ as the only front vowels in this dialect.

The long and short versions of each vowel were probably pronounced with the same quality, although some reconstructions assume accompanying qualitative distinctions.

- Short e i y o u are sometimes transcribed as "lax" [ɛ ɪ ʏ ɔ ʊ], in contrast to "tense" [eː iː yː oː uː] for long ē ī ȳ ō ū.
- The long–short vowel pair /æ æː/ developed into the Middle English vowels /a ɛː/, with two different vowel qualities distinguished by height: Hogg 1992 suggests they may have had different qualities in late Old English as well.
- The back low vowels /ɑ ɑː/ also generally show a qualitative distinction in Middle English: short /ɑ/ usually became Middle English /a/ (merging with the outcome of short /æ/), whereas long /ɑː/ was raised to Middle English [ɔː] except in northern dialects. In Old English, short /ɑ/ was probably pronounced as rounded [ɒ] before nasals, as is suggested by the fact that the word for "person", for example, is spelled as mann or monn.

==== Unstressed vowels ====
Unstressed syllables displayed fewer vowel contrasts. All unstressed vowels came to be shortened, and many texts only show a clear distinction in this context between three vowels, which can be phonemically transcribed as /ɑ e u/. Even this reduced three-way contrast was lost by Middle English, and the merger of unstressed /ɑ e u/ seems in fact to have occurred before the end of the Old English period. While they were probably still distinct in Early West Saxon as spoken in the late ninth century, unstressed vowels become increasingly confused in spelling during the tenth and eleventh centuries; thus, Late West Saxon texts show interchange between endings such as -an, -en, -um.

In texts that show a three-way contrast between unstressed vowels, the letters ⟨i⟩ and ⟨o⟩ in unstressed syllables can be analyzed as contextual variants of the phonemes /e/ and /u/ respectively. In the case of /e/, the variant [i] ⟨i⟩ seems to have been used in words ending in -iġ, -iċ, -isċ, -ing, -iht, -liċ (e.g. hāliġ); or in general, in the environment of a following palatal consonant. In the case of /u/, the quality ⟨u⟩ was normally preserved in the endings -um, -ung, -uc or after an accented syllable containing the /u/ sound (as in duguþ); in other contexts (e.g. hēafod, heofon), ⟨u⟩ was variably interchanged with ⟨o⟩ depending on dialect and time period, with the use of ⟨o⟩ generally increasing over time, although there was a tendency to retain ⟨u⟩ in absolute word-final position.

Unstressed /e/ developed from older /æ/ and /i/, and spellings with unstressed ⟨æ⟩ and ⟨i⟩ can be seen in certain early Old English texts. The merge of unstressed front vowels to a single quality can be dated to the eighth century or earlier.

=== Diphthongs ===
All dialects of Old English had diphthongs. Diphthongs were written with digraphs composed of two vowel letters and were pronounced by gliding from one vowel quality to another within a single syllable. The two main spellings used to represent diphthongs were ⟨ea⟩ and ⟨eo⟩. Some dialects had additional diphthongs, such as ⟨io⟩ or ⟨ie⟩. There is disagreement about how Old English vowel digraphs were pronounced and how they should be phonemically analyzed. Digraphs such as ⟨ea⟩ or ⟨ie⟩ may have represented monophthongal vowel sounds instead of diphthongs in certain circumstances.

It is generally agreed that diphthongs could be short or long (though this has been disputed). A short diphthong had the same length as a short single vowel, and a long diphthong had the same length as a long single vowel. As with monophthongs, their length was not systematically marked in Old English manuscripts, but is inferred from other evidence, such as a word's etymological origins or the pronunciation of its descendants. Modern editions conventionally mark long diphthongs with a macron on the first letter: e.g. long ⟨ēa⟩, ⟨ēo⟩ in contrast to short ⟨ea⟩, ⟨eo⟩. In phonetic or phonological transcriptions, it is possible to represent the length contrast by placing a breve over the short diphthongs and leaving long diphthongs unmarked (since the 'long' diphthongs in fact have the same length as original Germanic diphthongs). For the sake of clarity, this article marks both short and long diphthongs, transcribing short diphthongs like ea as [æ͝ɑ], and long diphthongs like ēa as [æ͞ɑ]: unmarked transcriptions like [æɑ] are used on this page only in contexts where length is not relevant.

Long diphthongs developed partly from the Proto-Germanic diphthongs *au, *eu, *iu and partly from Old English vowel shifts. Short diphthongs developed only from the Old English vowel shifts of breaking, palatal diphthongization, and back mutation.

The inventory of diphthongs in Late West Saxon was as follows:

Diphthongs in Old English
First element	Short (monomoraic)	Long (bimoraic)	Spelling (manuscripts)	Spelling (modern editions)
Mid	e͝o	e͞o	eo	eo, ēo
Low	æ͝ɑ	æ͞ɑ	ea	ea, ēa

==== ea ====
The diphthong ⟨ea⟩ was pronounced like [æɑ], gliding from the sound of the vowel ⟨æ⟩ to ⟨a⟩. This diphthong was occasionally spelled ⟨æa⟩ instead. The usual use of the spelling ⟨ea⟩ in place of ⟨æa⟩ or ⟨aea⟩ might have been motivated by a preference to avoid writing a trigraph of three vowel letters. Some evidence suggests the first element of this diphthong could have a slightly higher quality than the vowel [æ], so another possible pronunciation of this diphthong is [ɛɑ]. In Anglian dialects, long /æ͞ɑ/ was "smoothed" to /eː/ before ⟨h, g, c⟩, as in the words hēh "high", ēgan "eyes", iēces "cuckoo", contrasting with the vowel /æː/ found as the umlaut of /ɑː/ in words like ǣht "property", cǣġ "key", rǣċan "reach". Smoothed /æ͞ɑ/ can alternatively become /æː/ in some Anglian dialects, such as early Mercian glossaries. The dialectal variation between /eː/ and /æː/ would be understandable if Anglian smoothing of /æ͞ɑ/ initially resulted in a quality like [ɛː].

Long ēa came from the following sources:

- the Proto-Germanic diphthong *au (as in PG *dauþuz > OE dēaþ "death")
- breaking of Anglo-Frisian long *ǣ before /x/, seen in PG *nēhʷ > Pre-West Saxon *nǣh > West Saxon Old English nēah "near".
- palatal diphthongization (disputed) in West Saxon of Anglo-Frisian long *ǣ after ġ (/j/), ċ, or sċ (as in PG *jērą > AF *jǣr > West Saxon ġēar (Mercian/Northumbrian/Kentish ġēr); AF '*ġǣbun > West Saxon ġēafon; PWG *kākā > West Saxon ċēace "jaw" (Anglian ċēce); PWG *skāp > West Saxon sċēap), and variably also of umlauted Anglo-Frisian long *ā after sċ (as in PWG *skaiþiju > *skāþju > OE sċǣþ, sċēaþ "sheath")

Short ea came from the following sources:

- breaking of Anglo-Frisian short *æ before /x/ or before preconsonantal /r/ (including geminate /rr/), as in PG *ahtōu > eahta "eight", PG *armaz > earm "arm", PWG *farr > fearr "bull". Breaking did not affect *-ærj-, which evolved to -eri- /erj/, as in PG *hazjaną > herian "to praise". After breaking, there was a change of /xs/ to /ks/, and so ea is seen also before the consonant cluster /ks/ (spelled with the letter ⟨x⟩) in words such as PG *flahs > OE fleax "flax".
  - In West Saxon and Kentish, short *æ was also broken to ea before preconsonantal /l/, as in PG *kaldaz > ċeald "cold", PG *allai > ealle "all" (masculine nominative plural). In contrast, Anglian dialects retracted *æ to a /ɑ/ in this position: cald, alle. Breaking did not affect *-ælʲlʲ- from original *alj-, which evolved to -ell-, as in PG *saljaną > sellan. Breaking applied in combination with i-mutation to*ælC- or original *æll- + high front vowel, which produced ie in Early West Saxon, y in Late West Saxon, e in Kentish (e.g. EWS ieldra "older", fiell "a fall"; LWS fyllan "to fall"; Kent. welt "roll" (third person singular)); such words show æ in Anglian from umlaut of retracted a (e.g. Mercian ældra, ġefællan).
- palatal diphthongization (disputed) of æ after ġ (/j/), ċ, or sċ (as in AF *ġæb > West Saxon ġeaf; AF *ċæf > West Saxon ċeaf "chaff")
- back mutation of short æ before a back vowel. Words meeting this condition were generally absent in West Saxon because of the earlier change of a-restoration, but could occur in dialects that had second fronting.

In Anglian dialects, short ea was smoothed to æ~ae before h /x/ or x /xs~ks/ (as in mæht, saex). Anglian also smoothed ea before rh, rc, rg, but in this case the result was usually e (as in mercung, herg) except for in early Mercian glossaries, which tend to show æ~ae (as in faerh, spærca, waergrood). Early Anglian texts also contain some spellings with unsmoothed ea in these contexts.

Ringe & Taylor 2014 argue that short /æ͝ɑ/ had become its own phoneme distinct from /æ/ and /ɑ/ in Old English, citing evidence such as gærs (by metathesis for græs) compared to ears and calu, calw- compared to fealu, fealw-. Minimal pairs between /æ͝ɑ/ and /æ/ include ærn "house" vs. earn "eagle" and stæl "place" vs. steal "stall".

==== eo ====
The diphthong ⟨eo⟩ was pronounced like [eo], gliding from the sound of the vowel ⟨e⟩ to ⟨o⟩.

Long ēo came from the following sources:

- the Proto-Germanic diphthong *eu (as in PG *deuzą > OE dēor 'animal' > Modern English deer)
- breaking before /x/ of Anglo-Frisian long *ǣ in the Non-West Saxon dialects where it was raised to ē. Hogg 1992 cites Anglian nēolǣċan 'approach', nēowest 'nearest' (in the Vespasian Psalter) and Kentish nīor 'nearer' and nēor.
- In some dialects, from earlier īo (see below)

Short eo came from the following sources:

- breaking of Anglo-Frisian short *e before /x/, before preconsonantal /r/ (including geminate /rr/), before /w/, before /lw/, or before /lh/, as in PG *fehu > OE feoh 'cattle, property', PG *herdō > OE heord 'herd', PG *ferr- > OE feorr 'far', PG *knewa- > OE cneow- 'knee', PG *gelwaz > OE ġeolu 'yellow', PG *selhaz > OE seolh 'seal (animal)'
- back mutation of short *e before a back vowel, as in PG *sebun > AF *sefon > OE seofon 'seven'
- In some dialects, from earlier io (see below)

==== io ====
The diphthong ⟨io⟩ io, īo was found in Northumbrian, but was absent from Late West Saxon, having merged with eo, ēo (a merger also found to varying extents in other dialects). The quality of ⟨io⟩ is reconstructed as [iu] or [io]. The spelling ⟨io⟩ is attested in Early West Saxon, but it varies with the spelling ⟨eo⟩, suggesting the merger had already taken place in this dialect as of around 900 AD. In Mercian, ⟨eo⟩ and ⟨io⟩ are distinguished only in the earliest glosses; they merge in later texts, yielding eo, ēo as in West Saxon. In Kentish short eo, io tended to merge as eo, whereas long ēo, īo tended to merge as īo. In contexts where i-umlaut occurred, ⟨io⟩ corresponds instead in West Saxon to ⟨ie⟩ or later ⟨y⟩~⟨i⟩ (see below), as in Northumbrian þīostru, Mercian þēostru, Early West Saxon þīestru "darkness".

Long īo came from the following sources:

- the Proto-Germanic diphthong *iu, as in PG *biumi > Anglian bīom, West Saxon bēo '[I] am'
- breaking of Anglo-Frisian long *ī before /x/ (as in PG *tīhaną > Old English tīon, tēon 'to accuse')

Short io came from the following sources:

- breaking of Anglo-Frisian short *i before /x/, before preconsonantal /r/ (including geminate /rr/), before /w/, or before /lh/, as in PG *liznōjaną > Anglo-Frisian *lirnian > Anglian liornian, West Saxon leornian 'learn'
- back mutation of short *i, as in PG *niþanē > OE neoþan 'from beneath'

==== ie ====
The diphthong ⟨ie⟩ ie, īe was found exclusively in Early West Saxon. The quality of ⟨ie⟩ is disputed: proposals include [iy], [ie], [iə], or a monophthong with an intermediate quality between [i] and [e]. During the time of Alfred the Great, the spellings ⟨ie⟩ and ⟨i⟩ could be interchanged in writing: for example, in the words hiene and hieder, the digraph ⟨ie⟩ represents an etymological monophthong. This is interpreted as a sign that the sound spelled ⟨ie⟩ was pronounced in Alfred's time as a phonetic monophthong, which Quirk & Wrenn 1957 call "unstable ī̆". This "unstable ī̆" sound typically corresponds to ȳ̆ in Late West Saxon, as in gelȳfan for earlier gelīefan and gelīfan ('to believe'). In contrast, original ī̆ is usually unchanged in Late West Saxon, as in bīdan ('wait'). Therefore, Quirk & Wrenn 1957 assume that unstable ī̆ and original ī̆ remained phonetically distinct in Early West Saxon, even after they came to be interchanged in writing. (According to another interpretation, however, the "unstable i" may simply have been /i/, and the later /y/ can be explained by the fact that Late West Saxon was not a direct descendant of Early West Saxon. See Old English dialects.) That produced additional instances of /y(ː)/ alongside those that developed from i-mutation and from sporadic rounding of /i(ː)/ in certain circumstances (e.g. myċel 'much' from earlier miċel with rounding perhaps triggered by the rounded /m/).

Before a palatal consonant, however, EWS ī̆e normally corresponds to LWS ī̆, as in hīġ 'hay', niht 'night'; i was also common in ġifan 'to give', which might be a variant formation rather than a simplification of EWS ġiefan.

Early West Saxon ie, īe developed from i-mutation of ea, ēa or io, īo (at the time of i-mutation, the merger of the latter with eo, ēo seems to have not yet occurred). In dialects other than West Saxon, i-mutation instead turned ea, ēa into e, ē and left io, īo unchanged.

Long īe came from:

- i-mutation of what would otherwise become the diphthong ēa, from:
  - Proto-Germanic *au + later *ī̆, (as in PG *hauzijaną > EWS hīeran 'to hear', versus Kentish, Mercian hēran, North. hēra)
  - breaking of Anglo-Frisian long *ǣ before /x/ + later *ī̆, seen in PG *nēhʷistą > PWG *nāhwist > Early West Saxon nīehst 'nearest', Late West Saxon nīhst.
  - palatal diphthongization (disputed) of Anglo-Frisian long *ǣ + later *ī̆; this development is attested by PWG *kāsī > *kǣsī > LWS ċȳse "cheese" (versus Anglian, Kentish ċēse).
- i-mutation of what would otherwise become the diphthong īo, from:
  - Proto-Germanic *iu + later *ī̆ (as in PG *diurijaz > EWS dīere 'dear').
  - breaking of *ī before /x/ + later *ī̆, seen in PG *linhtijaną > LWS lȳhtan, PWG *skilhijan > LWS besċȳlan.
- palatal diphthongization (disputed) of *ē after a palatal consonant. There are very few examples, because palatal diphthongization was for the most part confined to West Saxon, which did not raise Anglo-Frisian *ǣ to ē the way that other dialects did. Hogg 1992 cites ġīe 'ye', an occasional alternative spelling in Early West Saxon of ġē, suggesting the latter form developed regularly as the unstressed version of the word; Hogg also mentions Early West Saxon ġīet, ġīt (Late West Saxon ġȳt, ġīt) as a possible example.
- i-mutation and palatal diphthongization after sċ- of original ō. Hogg 1992 cites LWS ġesċȳ 'shoes'.

Short ie came from:

- i-mutation of what would otherwise become the diphthong ea, from:
  - breaking of *æh, *ærC, *ærr + later *ī̆, as in PG *nahti- > EWS nieht, niht 'night'; PG *wahsīdi > EWS wiexþ, wixþ 'grows'-3s; PG *warmijaną > EWS wierman 'to warm', PNWG *firrijaną > EWS ā-fierran 'to remove'.
  - breaking of *ælC- or original *æll- + later *ī̆, which produced ie in Early West Saxon, y in Late West Saxon, e in Kentish (e.g. EWS ieldra 'older', fiell 'a fall'; LWS fyllan 'to fall'; Kent. welt 'roll'-3s); such words show æ in Anglian from umlaut of retracted a (e.g. Mercian ældra, ġefællan).
  - palatal diphthongization (disputed) of *ġæ, *ċæ, or *sċæ + later *j or *ī̆ (as in PG *gastiz > EWS ġiest; PG *katilaz > Late West Saxon ċytel; PG *skapjaną > EWS sċieppan). After sċ-, there are cases where (contrary to the typically reconstructed order of palatal diphthongization and i-umlaut) diphthongization appears to have applied after i-umlaut. Hogg 1992 cites EWS sċiendan, LWS sċyndan, ġesċyndnyss.
- i-mutation of what would otherwise become the diphthong io, from breaking of *ih, *irC, *irr + later *ī̆, as in PG *sihwidi > EWS siehþ 'see'-3s; PG *wirpidi > EWS wierpþ 'throw'-3s.
- palatal diphthongization (disputed) of *ġe, *ċe, or *sċe (as in PWG *gebu > EWS ġiefu, ġifu; PWG *skeran > EWS sċieran, sciran 'shave, shear')

==== Diphthong controversies ====
The phonetic realization of Old English diphthongs is controversial.

Assuming vowel digraphs were in fact pronounced as phonetic diphthongs, they may have been the "falling" type, where the first portion of the diphthong was more prominent, and the second part was a non-syllabic offglide. Alternatively, both components may have been more or less equal in prominence.

During the 20th century, various academic articles disputed the reconstruction of "short diphthongs", arguing that they were actually monophthongs (on the phonetic level, the phonemic level, or both). However, in response to these proposals, further arguments have been made in support of the proposition that short digraphs did in fact represent phonetic diphthongs. Hogg 1992 argues that a contrast between long and short diphthongs is not necessarily phonologically implausible, noting it is attested in some modern languages, such as Scots, where the short diphthong in tide /təid/ contrasts with the long diphthong in tied /taid/. In contrast, Minkova 2014 considers the evidence for the phonemic status of short diphthongs to be unconvincing and prefers to analyze short ⟨ea⟩, ⟨eo⟩ as allophones of /æ, e/, or at most, as semi-contrastive entities that never became completely distinct phonemes from the corresponding short monophthongs.

The primary feature that distinguished ⟨ea⟩ from ⟨eo⟩ seems to have been the height of the first component of the diphthong: the start of ⟨ea⟩ sounded like ⟨æ⟩ /æ/ whereas the start of ⟨eo⟩ sounded like ⟨e⟩ /e/. All diphthongs inherited from Proto-Germanic originally ended with high back rounded [u] (or [u̯]); this also seems to have been the original value of the second element of the diphthongs resulting from breaking. Diphthongs seem to have still ended in this quality at the time when i-umlaut occurred. Fulk 2014 assumes the qualities [æu̯ eu̯ iu̯ æːu̯ eːu̯ iːu̯] continued to be used into Old English for ea eo io ēa ēo īo respectively, but acknowledges that their values may have been different in late Old English. Ringe & Taylor 2014 assume that by the 9th century, the second component of ea had become lowered and unrounded (aside from in the minority of regions where the alternative spelling ⟨eo⟩ was used for this diphthong). Both components of [æɑ] are low vowels and both components of [eo] are mid vowels. Lass & Anderson 1975 propose that Old English diphthongs were "height-harmonic", that is, that both parts of any diphthong had the same vowel height (high, mid or low) as a rule. The reconstruction of io as [iu] and early West Saxon ie as [iy] is consistent with this principle of height harmony. However, Ringe & Taylor 2014 do not find height harmony convincing as a general rule, arguing that the later development of ie īe points instead to the value [iə̯ iːə̯]. Hogg 2011 considers the lowering of the second element of diphthongs to be related to the development of unstressed vowel qualities. While acknowledging that the height of the first element affected the outcome of the second, Hogg rejects height harmony as an overarching principle, and supposes that io came to be pronounced [io] in Old English, with [iu] only being its early or archaic value. Some other scholars have reconstructed ⟨ea⟩ and ⟨eo⟩ as ending in an unrounded schwa-like glide in Old English. (Note: For example, Quirk & Wrenn 1957 transcribe ea eo ēa ēo as [ɛə eə ɛ͞ə e͞ə] respectively. Minkova 2014 transcribes what are traditionally referred to as 'long diphthongs' ēa ēo īo as [æə eə iə] (and assumes that what are traditionally referred to as 'short diphthongs' did not end in a stable or fully contrastive offglide, suggesting that ea and eo were allophones of /æ, e/ that could be given transcriptions such as [ɛᵊ] or [eᵊ]).) However, there is evidence that Old English eo io ēo īo had rounded outcomes in some dialects of Middle English.

Another controversy concerns the development of ē̆a from ǣ̆, and of ī̆e from ē̆, in the context of West Saxon palatal diphthongization. It is difficult to explain why [æ e] would become [æɑ iy] after a palatal consonant: accordingly, Lass 1994 rejects the reality of this sound change and considers the digraphs in this context to be merely an orthographic device used to indicate that [æ e] were preceded by a palatal consonant. The mainstream position is that ǣ̆ and ē̆ were genuinely diphthongized in this position. It has been proposed that their initial outcomes were something like [eə̯ iə̯], with [eə̯] subsequently merging with ē̆a [æɑ].

== Stress ==
As in modern English, there was a distinction in Old English between stressed and unstressed syllables. Stress typically could be found only on the first or leftmost syllable of a root morpheme. In morphologically simple words, this is equivalent to the first syllable of the word: e.g. yfel 'evil', pronounced [ˈyvel]. Non-initial syllables within a morpheme were unstressed.

Inflectional suffixes are inferred to have been fully unstressed, based on the absence of alliteration involving these syllables (although in words with multiple unstressed syllables in a row, such as fremedon [ˈfremedon] 'they did', it is possible that there was some kind of alternating rhythm). Fully unstressed syllables did not contain long vowels or diphthongs.

When a simple word was extended by a derivational suffix, or when two roots capable of standing as free words were combined to form a compound, the primary stress fell on the first syllable of the leftmost root. However, there may have been secondary stress in some circumstances on the first syllable of the later element. In Old English verse, the first root of a compound participates in alliteration, whereas the second root of a compound can be involved in alliteration only as a supporting element, if it starts with the same consonant as the first root. Derivational suffixes and the second elements of compound words appear to display a wider range of vowel contrasts than inflectional suffixes: for example, a diphthong can be seen in the second syllable of the word spelled ⟨arleas⟩ 'honorless' derived from the morphemes ār 'honor' and lēas 'devoid of, bereft of' (as a suffix, '-less'). Since vowel length was not written in Old English, it is less clear to what extent long vowels may have been shortened, or conversely, analogically restored, in such derivational suffixes.

When a word started with a prefix, the primary stress could fall either on the first syllable of the prefix, or on the first syllable of the root that followed the prefix. Whether a prefix was stressed or unstressed depended on the identity of the prefix and on the part of speech of the word. The prefixes ġe- and be- were always fully unstressed, and the prefix for- was nearly always unstressed. (Note: There is a possible case in Old English poetry of the noun forwyrd alliterating on f-, implying stress on the first syllable, but there are seven cases where it instead alliterates on w-, implying stress on the second syllable. There is one case of alliteration on f- for the adjective forheardne, where for- serves as intensive prefix.) In contrast, the prefixes and- and ed- always received primary stress. Other prefixes seem to have generally received primary stress in nouns or adjectives, but not in verbs or adverbs. The prefix hund-, used on numerals for the decades 70-120, was unstressed.

== Phonotactics ==
Phonotactics is the study of the sequences of phonemes that occur in languages and the sound structures that they form. When describing syllable structure, a capital letter C can be used to represent a consonant sound and a capital letter V can be used to represent a vowel sound, so a syllable such as 'be' is described as having CV structure (one consonant followed by one vowel). The IPA symbol that shows a division between syllables is the dot [.].

Old English stressed syllables were structured as (C)^{3}V(C)^{4}: that is, one vowel as the nucleus with zero to three consonant phonemes in the onset and zero to four consonant phonemes in the coda. An example of a stressed syllable with the minimal number of phonemes would be ǣ 'law, statute', whereas an example of a stressed syllable with nearly the maximum number of phonemes would be bringst (the syncopated second-person singular present form of the strong verb bringan 'bring').

=== Onset ===
Onset clusters typically consist of a obstruent /p, b, t, d, k, ɣ, s, ʃ, f, θ, x/ followed by a sonorant /m, n, r, l, w/, although /s/ is allowed as a third element before voiceless stops, and /w/ is allowed before /r, l/. The consonants /j, tʃ/ occur only on their own. (If /n̥, r̥, l̥, ʍ, rˠ, ɫ/ are accepted as their own phonemes, the same can be said of these consonants and of /x/, but these are normally analyzed respectively as /xn, xr, xl, xw, wr, wl/.) Some have proposed analyzing clusters of /s/ and a voiceless stop as single segments. In Old English alliterative poetry, a word-initial sequence of /s/ + voiceless stop alliterates only with itself (with or without a following liquid): that is, ⟨st⟩ and ⟨str⟩ count as a match, as do ⟨sp⟩ and ⟨spl⟩, but ⟨st⟩ and /sp/ do not alliterate with each other.

Unpalatalized /sk/ and /skr/ did not occur as a rule at the start of a word, since in inherited vocabulary, original */sk/ came to be palatalized in this position regardless of what sound followed it. The cluster /sk/ could be found word-medially before a back vowel, e.g. in the words þerscan and discas, although the lack of palatalization in such forms might imply that the /s/ was shared between the first and second syllable. The cluster /skr/ probably occurred medially in malscrung, judging by the forms of the related Middle English malskren and Modern English masker. Kuhn 1970 assumes that /sk/ was found at the start of the word scolere, from Latin scholārius, but Campbell 1959 transcribes it as sċolere; the form sċrift from Latin scrīpt- shows that palatalized sċ- could come to be used at the start of Old English words taken from Latin.

The onset was optional, so syllables could start with a vowel phoneme. In Old English poetry, stressed syllables starting with vowel phonemes all alliterate with each other (regardless of whether the vowels are the same or different). A glottal stop consonant [ʔ] may have been phonetically inserted in this position. (Hogg 2011 views alliteration as inconclusive evidence for initial [ʔ].)

Old English syllable onsets
First consonant	Middle consonant	Last consonant						Examples
First consonant	Middle consonant	-∅	-m	-n	-r	-l	-w	Examples
∅-	-∅-		m	n	r	l	w	mann, næġl, rūn, lār, word
∅-	-p-	p	—		pr	pl	—	port, prēost, plega
∅-	-b-	b	—		br	bl	—	bōc, blōd, brād
∅-	-t-	t	—		tr	—	tw	tōþ, trēow, twelf
∅-	-d-	d	—		dr	—	dw	dæġ, drincan, dwola
∅-	-k-	k	—	kn	kr	kl	kw	cuman, cniht, cræft, clif, cwēn
∅-	-ɣ-	ɡ	—	ɡn	ɡr	ɡl	—	gāt, gnīdan, grēne, glæd
∅-	ʃ-	ʃ	—		ʃr	—		sċūr, sċrūd
∅-	f-	f	—	fn	fr	fl	—	fæder, fnæd, frēond, flōd
∅-	θ-	θ	—		θr	—	θw	þæt, þridda, þwēal
∅-	x-	h	—	hn̥	hr̥	hl̥	hʍ	hām, hnutu, hrīm, hlūd, hwæl
s-	-∅-	s	sm	sn	—	sl	sw	sōþ, smiþ, snāw, slǣp, swēte
s-	-p-	sp	—		spr	spl	—	spēd, sprecan, splott
s-	-t-	st	—		str	—		stān, strǣt
s-	-k-	sk	—		skr	—		scōl
Other		j, tʃ, wr, wl						ġēar, ċild, wrāð, wlanc

=== Nucleus ===
The syllable nucleus was always a vowel in stressed syllables. Stressed monosyllabic words always ended in either a consonant or a long vowel (whether a long monophthong or long diphthong): this can be stated in terms of stressed words having at least two moras of length. In words of two or more syllables, it was possible for the stressed syllable to end in a short vowel (called a light syllable), although two-syllable words more often had a heavy first syllable (one that ended in a consonant or long vowel).

It is possible that certain sonorant consonants, such as /n/ or /l/, could serve as the nucleus of an unstressed syllable. However, it is difficult to determine whether or in which contexts consonants were syllabic in Old English, because the relevant forms show variable spelling (a vowel letter, presumably representing an epenthetic vowel sound, could often be inserted before the sonorant) and variable behavior in verse.

=== Coda ===
In general, Old English permitted similar kinds of clusters of coda consonants as modern English. In morphologically simple words, most coda clusters started with a sonorant or /s/.

Long (geminate) consonants seem to have become simplified to single consonants when not between vowels. However, [dʒ] (analyzed above as long /jj/) did not merge with single /j/ in this context, but remained a distinct coda.

The following tables show some examples of coda clusters that could occur in Old English, while not necessarily constituting an exhaustive list. Although /j/ might be categorized as a resonant, it had non-resonant allophones, and so will be listed alongside obstruent consonants in the tables below.

One resonant + one obstruent
C1	C2 (Second consonant)													Examples
C1	/t/	/d/	/θ/	/s/	/p/	/b/	/f/	/k/	/x/	/ɣ~g/	/j~dʒ/	/tʃ/	/ʃ/	Examples
/r/	/rt/	/rd/	/rθ/	/rs/	/rp/		/rf/	/rk/	/rx/	/rɣ/	/rj/	/rtʃ/	/rʃ/	sċort, word, weorð, gærs, sċeorp, turf, weorc, þweorh, beorg, byrġ, wyrċ, mersċ
/l/	/lt/	/ld/	/lθ/	/ls/	/lp/		/lf/	/lk/	/lx/	/lɣ/	/lj/	/ltʃ/	/lʃ/	sealt, gold, gælð, frēols, help, wulf, folc, seolh, dolg, *bielġ, hwelċ, melsċ
/n/	/nt/	/nd/	/nθ/		—	—	— (Note: Historically, the absence of syllables ending in /mf/ or /nf/ is not accidental: there are no regular etymological sources for these coda clusters.)	/nk/		/nɣ~ng/	[ndʒ]	/ntʃ/		ent, land, hȳnþ, dranc, sang, lenġ, benċ
/m/			/mθ/	(/ms/)	/mp/	/mb/	—	—	—	—	—	—		frymþ, ġelimp, lamb
/w/	/wt/	/wd/	/wθ/											ðēowt (=þēowet), ēowd (=ēowde), blēwþ

Some codas with an obstruent preceded by more than one resonant are attested, often as the result of syncope, e.g:

- /rnθ/, as in irnþ
- /rmθ/, /rms/, as in yrmþ, wyrms
- /rld/, as in weorld (a sycopated variant form of weorold)
- /lmd/, /lmθ/, as in cwylmd, cwylmð (syncopated variant forms of cwylmed and cwylmeð, the past participle and third person present singular of cwylman = cwielman)

Two obstruents with no preceding resonant
/t/			/θ/					/s/		Examples
/st/	/ft/	/xt/	/pθ/	/fθ/	/kθ/	/xθ/	/jθ/ (Note: In West Saxon (particularly Late West Saxon), /j/ was usually lost between a vowel and a following consonant (typically /θ/, /d/, /n/), in which case the preceding vowel was lengthened.)	/ps/	/ks/	dūst, cræft, ǣht, bestæpþ, drīfð, brȳcþ, mǣġþ, wæps, seax

The following additional two-obstruent coda clusters may rarely occur:

- /fs/ was normally replaced with /ps/, but there are some variant spellings with final ⟨fs⟩, such as wæfs, which may represent the original pronunciation.
- /xs/ was normally replaced with /ks/, but some variant spellings with final ⟨hs⟩ can be found, such as þreahs for þreax. It is possible that early on, the letter ⟨x⟩ was used to represent /xs/ rather than /ks/.
- /sp/, as in ġeresp, hosp, hyspte (past of hyspan). This could become /ps/ by metathesis, as in crisp~cyrps 'curly' from Latin crispus.
- /sk/, as in frosc. Uncommon compared to sċ /ʃ/, and often varies with ⟨x⟩ /ks/ (as in frox) by metathesis.
- /fd/, /jd/, as in ġenæfd, ġehyġd
- /tʃt/ might occur at the end of some Kentish verb forms spelled with ⟨ct⟩, namely ofðreċt and ġehyðlǣċt. (Campbell 1959 marks these with ⟨ċt⟩ but assumes ⟨ċ⟩ was phonetically a palatal stop, rather than affricate, when followed by another consonant. Hogg & Fulk 2011, p. 219 transcribe them with dotless ⟨ct⟩, assuming that preconsonantal ⟨ċ⟩ had already been replaced with velar ⟨c⟩ in Old English.)
- /θs/ was apparently regularly assimilated to /ss/ (which in turn was degeminated in syllable-final position to /s/), as in the nominative forms of the nouns bliss and liss, which would etymologically be blīþs and līþs. Some variant spellings can be found that do not show this simplification, but it is unclear whether the consonant was ever restored in pronunciation.

Two obstruents preceded by one resonant
	/t/				/θ/						/s/			Examples
	/st/	/ft/	/xt/	/kt/	/tθ/	/pθ/	/fθ/	/kθ/	/xθ/	/jθ/	/ts/	/ps/	/ks/	Examples
/r/	/rst/	/rft/	/rxt/			/rpθ/	/rfθ/	/rkθ/	/rxθ/	/rjθ/		/rps/	/rks/	fierst, edhwyrft, beorht, wyrpð, dyrfð, byrcþ (=biercþ), ferhþ, wyrġð, cyrps, horxlīċe
/l/	/lst/		/lxt/	/lkt/		/lpθ/	/lfθ/	/lkθ/		/ljθ/	/lts/			fylst, ġefulhtnede, ċilct, hilpð, sċylfð, ġewilcþ, (Note: The noun ġewilcþ 'rolling' is attested as a gloss of Latin motum in Arundel MS. No. 60 of the Psalterium Davidis Latino-Saxonicum vetus, psalm 88 verse 10; other manuscripts have ġewẏlc instead.) bylġþ, milts~milds
/n/	/nst/	—		/nkt/	/ntθ/	—	—	/nkθ/		—		—		canst, sanct, ġesċendð~ġesċentð, þyncþ
/m/	/mst/	—	—	—		/mpθ/	—	—	—	—			—	cymst, limpþ
/w/	/wst/													flēwst

Three obstruents preceded by up to one resonant
	/tst/	/θst/	/pst/	/fst/	/kst/	/xst/	/jst/	Examples
-∅-	/tst/	/θst/	/pst/	/fst/	/kst/	/xst/	/jst/	ābītst, cwiðst (also cwist), drȳpst (=drīepst), hæfst, bæcst, flīehst, sæġst
/r/			/rpst/	/rfst/	/rkst/		/rjst/	wyrpst (=wierpst), ċyrfst (=ċierfst), wyrcst, byrġst (=bierġst)
/l/	/ltst/		/lpst/	/lfst/	/lkst/		/ljst/	ġehiltst, hilpst, dilfst, *milcst, (Note: The form *milcst can be inferred based on the conjugation class of the verb melcan.) bilġst
/n/	/ntst/	—	—	—	/nkst/	—	—	fintst, drincst

Additional possible three-obstruent clusters include:

- /ksθ/, as in wixð (third-person singular present form of wexan, smoothed variant of weaxan), if not simply a morphological spelling for /kst/.

Although resonant consonants such as /n/ or /l/ could occur word-finally after another consonant, there is some uncertainty about whether they were pronounced as coda consonants or as syllabic consonants (forming unstressed syllable nuclei) in this context. The tables below show word-final sequences ending in a resonant consonant:

Two resonants
	/l/	/n/	/m/	Examples
/r/	/rl/	/rn/	/rm/	ċeorl, þorn, wyrm
/l/	†/ll/	/ln/	/lm/	†eall, eln, cwealm
/n/	‡/nl/	†/nn/	—	‡ēarspinl, †cynn
/m/	‡/ml/	/mn/	†/mm/	‡cuml, stemn, †ramm
/w/	‡/wl/	—	—	sāwl

†It is assumed that geminate consonants such as /ll/, /nn/, /mm/ were simplified by the Old English period to single consonants when entirely in a syllable coda.

‡The final /l/ in words ending in /nl/, /ml/, /wl/ could potentially become syllabic or have an epenthetic vowel inserted before it; see below. This possibly could apply also to the final /n/ in /ln/.

Because of the loss of certain vowels in final syllables, Proto-West-Germanic came to have words ending in sequences of an obstruent consonant followed by a resonant consonant: for example, Proto-Germanic *xlaxtraz developed to Proto-West-Germanic *xlaxtr. In the past, it was sometimes assumed that a resonant consonant in such a position must necessarily be syllabic. This assumption is false: there are languages where a syllable can end in an obstruent followed by a resonant, as demonstrated by modern Icelandic, where vatn, býsn, segl, gísl are all monosyllables. There is evidence that this type of coda cluster eventually became disallowed in Old English, because many such words show a spelling with a vowel letter inserted before the consonant, such as hleahtor. However, some words could be spelled with or without an inserted vowel letter in Old English, raising the question of whether there was also variation between different pronunciations. Based on the treatment of such words in poetry, Fulk 1989 argues that their pronunciation changed either during or shortly before the time period when Old English literature was written: when not etymologically preceded by a vowel, resonant consonants in this position were generally nonsyllabic in early Old English verse, whereas in late Old English verse, they came to be syllabic (or preceded by an epenthetic vowel). Fulk finds that the syllabic pronunciations are generally used consistently in poetry from the ninth century or later. The development of a syllabic pronunciation seems to have been affected by the identity of the resonant, the identity of the consonant preceding the resonant, and the weight of the syllable.

- Word-final consonant + ⟨r⟩ sequences are practically always spelled with an epenthetic vowel letter in Old English manuscripts, e.g. æcer, fōdor, fæġer, although these epenthetic vowels do not always count as syllables in early Old English poetry.
- Word-final consonant + ⟨l⟩ sequences may be spelled with or without an epenthetic vowel depending on the identity of the consonant. An inserted vowel letter is never seen in ⟨rl⟩, and usually not in ⟨tl⟩, ⟨dl⟩, ⟨þl⟩, ⟨sl⟩, ⟨fl⟩, ⟨ġl⟩, but is seen often in other combinations, e.g. ⟨pl⟩, ⟨bl⟩, ⟨gl⟩, ⟨wl⟩, ⟨nl⟩. In poetry, ⟨l⟩ never scans as its own syllable after /d t f s/. (Note: Except possibly in the case of the word ādl.)
- Word-final consonant + ⟨n⟩ sequences show considerable variability. Spellings with an epenthetic vowel seem to be generally uncommon in words ending with a short vowel + single consonant + ⟨n⟩, e.g. swefn, reġn, stemn, although a few spellings with inserted ⟨e⟩ are attested early on (namely efen and ofen) and others are attested in late West Saxon. In cases where word-final ⟨n⟩ is preceded by more than one consonant, or by a syllable containing a long vowel or diphthong, the inclusion of an epenthetic vowel letter is variable, possibly affected by dialect.
- Word-final sequences of a consonant + ⟨m⟩ never scan as a separate syllable in poetry, and are never spelled with an epenthetic vowel letter in early West Saxon: e.g. ⟨māþm⟩, ⟨fæþm⟩, ⟨bōsm⟩, ⟨botm⟩, ⟨wæstm⟩, ⟨breahtm⟩. In texts from other time periods or dialects, spellings with ⟨um⟩ (e.g. late West Saxon ⟨māþum⟩, ⟨bōsum⟩) or ⟨em⟩ (e.g. Mercian ⟨westem⟩) can be found except for in words ending with ⟨rm⟩ or ⟨lm⟩.

Potential coda clusters ending in a resonant
last C	full cluster	Examples
/l/	/dl/, /tl/, /sl/, /fl/, /jl/, /mpl/, /nɣl~ngl/	nǣdl, setl, sūsl, ċeafl, seġl, templ, tungl
/n/	/fn/, /mn/, /stn/, /pn/, /kn/, /jn/	hræfn, stemn, fæstn, wǣpn, tācn, seġn
/m/	/tm/, /stm/, /htm/, /rhtm/, /sm/, /θm/	botm, bearhtm, wæstm, bōsm

== Sound changes ==
Like Frisian, Old English underwent palatalization of the velar consonants /k ɣ/ and fronting of the open vowel /ɑ ɑː/ to /æ æː/ in certain cases. Old English also underwent vowel shifts that were not shared with Old Frisian: smoothing, diphthong height harmonization and breaking. Diphthong height harmonization and breaking resulted in the unique Old English diphthongs io, ie, eo, ea.

Palatalization yielded some Modern English word pairs in which one word has a velar and the other has a palatal or postalveolar. Some of these were inherited from Old English (drink and drench, day and dawn), and others have an unpalatalized form loaned from Old Norse (skirt and shirt).

== Dialects ==
Old English had four major dialect groups: Kentish, West Saxon, Mercian and Northumbrian. Kentish and West Saxon were the dialects spoken south of a line approximately following the course of the River Thames: Kentish in the easternmost portion of that area and West Saxon everywhere else. Mercian was spoken in the middle part of England and was separated from the southern dialects by the Thames and from Northumbrian by the River Humber. Mercian and Northumbrian are often grouped together as "Anglian".

Modern English descends mostly from the Anglian dialect, rather than the standard West Saxon dialect of Old English. However, since London sits on the Thames, near the boundary of the Anglian, West Saxon and Kentish dialects, some West Saxon and Kentish forms have entered Modern English. For example, the spelling of the verb bury is derived from West Saxon, but the pronunciation /ˈbɛri/ is derived from Kentish.

The largest dialectal differences in Old English occurred between West Saxon and the other groups and occurred mostly in the front vowels, particularly the diphthongs. In Kentish, the vowels æ, e, y would eventually all merge as e (long and short). The primary differences between dialects were the following:

- Original /æː/ (derived from Proto-West-Germanic *ā by Anglo-Frisian brightening) remained as ǣ in West Saxon, but was raised to ē in Anglian. This preceded other changes such as breaking and the development of ǣ by i-umlaut of Old English ā (from Proto-Germanic *ai). Thus, West Saxon slǣpan ('to sleep') appears as slēpan in Anglian, but dǣlan ('to divide') from *dailijan appears the same in both dialects. (Note the corresponding vowel difference in the spelling of Modern English "sleep" and "deal", from Anglian slēpan and dǣlan.) Hogg 2011 thinks early Kentish had ǣ like West Saxon, whereas Ringe & Taylor 2014 argue that Kentish originally had ē as in Anglian based on the development of the diphthong ēo in the adverb nēor.
- The West Saxon vowels ie/īe were caused by i-umlaut of long and short ea, eo, io and did not appear in Anglian. Instead, i-umlaut of ea and rare eo are spelled e, and i-umlaut of io remains io.
- Breaking of short /æ/ to ea did not happen in Anglian before /l/ followed by a consonant; instead, the vowel was retracted to /ɑ/. When mutated by i-umlaut, it appears again as æ (vs. West Saxon ie): Anglian cald ('cold') vs. West Saxon ċeald.
- The merger of eo and io (long and short) occurred early in West Saxon but much later in Anglian.
- Many instances of diphthongs in Anglian, including the majority of those caused by breaking, were turned back into monophthongs again by the process of "Anglian smoothing", which occurred before c, h, g, alone or preceded by r or l. That accounts for some of the most noticeable differences between standard (West Saxon) Old English and Modern English spelling: ēage ('eye') became ēge in Anglian; nēah ('near') became Anglian nēh and was later raised to nīh in the transition to Middle English by the raising of ē before h (hence nigh in Modern English); nēahst ('nearest') become Anglian nēhst, shortened to nehst in late Old English by vowel-shortening before three consonants (hence next in Modern English).

All dialects of Old English seem to have shared palatalization as a sound change, including Northumbrian. Forms in Modern English with hard /k/ and /ɡ/ in which a palatalized sound would be expected from Old English appear to be influenced by Scandinavian.

== Examples ==
The prologue to Beowulf:

Hwæt! Wē Gārdena in ġeārdagum
[ˈhʍæt weː ˈɡɑːrˠˌde.nɑ in ˈjɑːrˠˌdɑ.ɣum]
þēodcyninga þrym ġefrūnon,
[ˈθe͞odˌky.niŋ.ɡɑ ˈθrym jeˈfruː.non]
hū ðā æþelingas ellen fremedon.
[ˈhuː θɑː ˈæ.ðe.liŋ.ɡɑs ˈel.len ˈfre.me.don]
Oft Sċyld Sċēfing sċeaþena þrēatum,
[oft ˈʃyɫd ˈʃeː.viŋɡ ˈʃɑ.ðe.nɑ ˈθræ͞ɑ.tum]
monegum mǣġþum meodo-setla oftēah.
[ˈmɒ.ne.ɣum ˈmæːj.ðum (Note: Or ˈmæːj.θum, if the fricative remained voiceless after unstressed vowel syncope.) ˈme.duˌset.lɑ ofˈtæ͞ɑx]
Eġsode eorl, syððan ǣrest wearð
[ˈej.zo.de (Note: Or ˈej.so.de, if the fricative remained voiceless after unstressed vowel syncope.) ˈe͝orˠɫ ˈsɪθ.θɑn ˈæː.rest wæ͝ɑrˠθ]
fēasċeaft funden; hē þæs frōfre ġebād,
[ˈfæ͞ɑˌʃæ͝ɑft ˈfun.den ˈheː θæs ˈfroː.vre jeˈbɑːd]
wēox under wolcnum, weorð-myndum þāh,
[ˈwe͞oks un.der ˈwoɫk.num ˈwe͝orˠðˌmyn.dum ˈθɑːx]
oð þæt him ǣġhwylċ þāra ymb-sittendra
[ˈoθ θæt him ˈæːjˌhʍyɫtʃ ˈθɑː.rɑ ymbˈsit.ten.drɑ]
ofer hronrāde hȳran sċolde,
[ˈo.ver ˈhr̥ɒnˌrɑː.de ˈhyː.rɑn ʃoɫ.de]
gomban ġyldan; þæt wæs gōd cyning.
[ˈɡɒm.bɑn ˈjyɫ.dɑn ˈθæt wæs ˈɡoːd ˈky.niŋɡ]

Fæder ūre
Recording of the Lord's Prayer in reconstructed Old English

The Lord's Prayer:

Line	Original	IPA	Translation
[1]	Fæder ūre þū þe eart on heofonum,	[ˈfæ.der ˈuː.re | ˈθuː θe ˌæ͝ɑrt on ˈhe͝o.vo.num]	Our father, you who are in heaven,
[2]	Sīe þīn nama ġehālgod.	[ˈsi͞y θiːn ˈnɒ.mɑ jeˈhɑːɫ.ɣod]	May your name be hallowed.
[3]	Tōbecume þīn rīċe,	[ˌtoː.beˈku.me ˌθiːn ˈriː.tʃe]	May your kingdom come,
[4]	Ġeweorðe þīn willa, on eorðan swā swā on heofonum.	[jeˈwe͝orˠ.ðe ˌθiːn ˈwil.lɑ | on ˈe͝orˠ.ðan ˈswɑː ˌswɑː on ˈhe͝o.vo.num]	Your will be done, on Earth as in heaven.
[5]	Ūrne dæġhwamlīċan hlāf sele ūs tōdæġ,	[ˌuːrˠ.ne ˈdæj.hʍɑmˌliː.tʃɑn ˈhl̥ɑːf | ˈse.le uːs toːˈdæj]	Give us our daily bread today,
[6]	And forġief ūs ūre gyltas, swā swā wē forġiefaþ ūrum gyltendum.	[ˌɒnd forˠˈji͝yv uːs ˌuː.re ˈɣyl.tɑs | ˈswɑː ˌswɑː weː forˠˈji͝y.vɑθ ˌuː.rum ˈɣyl.ten.dum]	And forgive us our debts, as we forgive our debtors.
[7]	And ne ġelǣd þū ūs on costnunge, ac ālīes ūs of yfele.	[ˌɒnd ne jeˈlæːd ðuː ˌuːz on ˈkost.nuŋ.ɡe | ɑk ɑːˈli͞yz uːs of ˈy.ve.le]	And do not lead us into temptation, but rescue us from evil.
[8]	Sōðlīċe.	[ˈsoːðˌliː.tʃe]	Amen.

== Bibliography ==
- Anderson, John (2005). "Old English i-umlaut (for the umpteenth time)". English Language and Linguistics. 9 (2): 195–227. doi:10.1017/S1360674305001620.
- Baker, Peter S. (2007). Introduction to Old English (2nd ed.). Oxford: Blackwell. ISBN 978-1-4051-5272-3.
- Baker, Peter S. (2012). Introduction to Old English (3rd ed.). Wiley-Blackwell.
- Campbell, Alistair (1959). Old English Grammar (1st ed.). Oxford Clarendon Press. ISBN 978-0-19-811901-2
- Cercignani, Fausto (1983). "The Development of */k/ and */sk/ in Old English". Journal of English and Germanic Philology. 82 (3): 313–323. JSTOR 27709191.
- Colman, F. (1985). "Old English ie: quid est?". Lingua. 67 (1): 1–23. doi:10.1016/0024-3841(85)90010-5.
- Colman, Fran (2004). "Kentish Old English <b>/<B>: orthographic 'archaism' or evidence of Kentish phonology?". English Language and Linguistics. 8 (2): 171–205. doi:10.1017/S1360674304001364.
- Fulk, R. D. (1989). "West Germanic Parasiting, Sievers' Law, and the Dating of Old English Verse". Studies in Philology. 86 (2): 117–138. JSTOR 24174331.
- Fulk, R. D. (2002). "Conditions for the voicing of Old English fricatives, II: morphology and syllable structure". English Language and Linguistics. 6 (1): 81–104. doi:10.1017/S1360674302001053.
- Fulk, Robert D. (2014). An introductory grammar of Old English with an anthology of readings. Tempe, Arizona: ACMRS Press. ISBN 978-0-86698-514-7.
- Goossens, L. (1969). "A Chronology for the Falling Together of Late Old English hr and r". English Studies. 50 (1–6): 74–79. doi:10.1080/0013838X.1969.10801351.
- Hickey, Raymond (1984). "Remarks on Assimilation in Old English". Folia Linguistica Historica. 18 (of Folia Linguistica), 5 (of Folia Linguistica Historica) (2): 279–303. doi:10.1515/flih.1984.5.2.279.
- Gradon, Pamela (1979). Dan Michel's Ayenbite of Inwit. Vol. 2. Oxford University Press.
- Hogg, Richard M. (1992). "Chapter 3: Phonology and Morphology". In Hogg, Richard M. (ed.). The Cambridge History of the English Language. Vol. 1: The Beginnings to 1066. Cambridge University Press. pp. 67–168. doi:10.1017/CHOL9780521264747. ISBN 978-0-521-26474-7.
- Hogg, Richard M. (2011) [1992]. A Grammar of Old English. Vol. 1: Phonology. John Wiley & Sons. ISBN 978-0-631-13672-9.
- Hogg, Richard M.; Fulk, R. D. (2011). A Grammar of Old English. Vol. 2. Morphology. John Wiley & Sons. ISBN 978-0-631-13671-2.
- Howell, Robert B. (1991). Old English Breaking and its Germanic Analogues. Linguistische Arbeiten. Max Niemeyer Verlag. doi:10.1515/9783111356501. ISBN 978-3-484-30253-2.
- Kuhn, Sherman M. (1970). "On the Consonantal Phonemes of Old English". In Rosier, James L. (ed.). Philological Essays: Studies in Old and Middle English Language and Literature in Honor of Herbert Dean Meritt. Mouton & Co. pp. 16–49. doi:10.1515/9783110820263-004. ISBN 978-3-11-082026-3.
- Kuhn, Sherman M.; Quirk, Randolph (1955). "The Old English Digraphs: A Reply". Language. 31 (3): 390–401. JSTOR 410806.
- Lass, Roger (1994). Old English: A historical linguistic companion. Cambridge University Press. ISBN 0-521-43087-9.
- Lass, Roger (1988). "The 'Akzentumsprung' of Old English ēo". In Duncan-Rose, Caroline; Vennemann, Theo (eds.). On Language: Rhetorica, Phonologica, Syntactica: a Festschrift for Robert P. Stockwell from his Friends and Colleagues. Routledge. ISBN 978-0-7099-4554-3.
- Lass, Roger (1991–1993). "Old English Fricative Voicing Unvisited". Studia Anglica Posnaniensia. 25–27: 3–45. hdl:10593/18008.
- Lass, Roger; Anderson, John M. (1975). Old English Phonology. Cambridge studies in linguistics. Vol. 14. ISBN 978-0-521-20531-3.
- Lass, R; Laing, M (2010). "In celebration of early middle English 'H'" (PDF). Neuphilologische Mitteilungen. 111 (3): 345–354.
- Minkova, Donka (2003). Alliteration and Sound Change in Early English. Cambridge University Press. ISBN 0-521-57317-3.
- Minkova, Donka (2008). "Prefixation and stress in Old English: In memoriam Richard Hogg (1944–2007)". Word Structure. 1 (1): 21–52. doi:10.3366/E1750124508000056. ISSN 1750-1245.
- Minkova, Donka (2011). "Phonemically Contrastive Fricatives in Old English?". English Language and Linguistics. 15 (1). Cambridge University Press: 31–59. doi:10.1017/S1360674310000274.
- Minkova, Donka (2014). A Historical Phonology of English. Edinburgh University Press Ltd. ISBN 978-0-7486-3469-9.
- Mitchell, Bruce; Robinson, Fred C. (2001). A Guide to Old English (6th ed.). Oxford: Blackwell. ISBN 0-631-22636-2.
- Murray, Robert (2017). "Phonology". In Brinton, Laurel J.; Bergs, Alexander (eds.). Old English. The History of English. De Gruyter. doi:10.1515/9783110525304. ISBN 978-3-11-052273-0.
- Quirk, R.; Wrenn, C.L. (1957). An Old English Grammar. Psychology Press.
- Ringe, Don; Taylor, Ann (2014). The Development of Old English. Oxford University Press. ISBN 978-0-19-920784-8.
- Robb, K. A. (1968). "Some changes in Kentish OE phonology". Lingua. 20: 177–186. doi:10.1016/0024-3841(68)90141-1.
- Schrijver, Peter (2014). Language Contact and the Origins of the Germanic Languages. Routledge. ISBN 978-0-415-35548-3.
- Suzuki, Seiichi (1989). "On determining the sonority value of /w/ relative to /r/ and /l/ in early West Germanic". Folia Linguistica Historica. X/1-2: 21–34. doi:10.1515/flih.1989.10.1-2.21.
- Suzuki, Seiichi (1996). The Metrical Organization of Beowulf: Prototype and Isomorphism. Trends in Linguistics: Studies and Monographs. Mouton de Gruyter. doi:10.1515/9783110810493. ISBN 978-3-11-015134-3.
- Sweet, Henry (1888). A History of English Sounds from the Earliest Period with Full Word-Lists. Oxford: Clarendon Press.
- Toon, Thomas E. (1992). "Chapter 6: Old English Dialects". In Hogg, Richard M. (ed.). The Cambridge History of the English Language. Vol. 1: The Beginnings to 1066. Cambridge University Press. pp. 67–168. doi:10.1017/CHOL9780521264747. ISBN 978-0-521-26474-7.
