= Welsh grammar =

Grammar rules of the Welsh language

Welsh grammar reflects the patterns of linguistic structure that permeate the use of the Welsh language. Documentation of Welsh grammar began around 1700, as scholars reviewed collections of historical manuscripts.

The following articles contain more information on Welsh grammar, including its syntax and morphology:

- Welsh syntax
- Colloquial Welsh morphology (the patterns that shape the spoken language as it is used by present-day Welsh speakers)
- Literary Welsh morphology (the rules governing the use of the formal written language, normally corresponding to older, historical patterns)

== See also ==
- Welsh phonology
- Welsh orthography
- Welsh numerals
- History of the Welsh language
