= Manx grammar =

Grammar of the Manx language

The grammar of the Manx language has much in common with related Indo-European languages, such as nouns that display gender, number and case and verbs that take endings or employ auxiliaries to show tense, person or number. Other morphological features are typical of Insular Celtic languages but atypical of other Indo-European languages. These include initial consonant mutation, inflected prepositions and verb–subject–object word order.

== Nouns ==
=== Gender ===
Manx nouns fall into one of two genders, masculine or feminine. As with Old Irish, there is evidence for the existence of a third neuter gender in Classical Manx, but neuter nouns are thought to have been gradually converted to masculine.

Masculine is considered the "default" or "unmarked" gender. Nouns ending in a "broad" (non-palatalised) consonant are usually masculine, as are those ending in the suffixes: -agh, -an, -ane, -ee, -er, -erey, -ey, -oo, -oon, -oor, -ys. Nouns ending in a "slender" (palatalised) consonant are usually feminine, as are those ending in the suffixes: -ag, -age, -aght, -eig, -id, -oge. Verbnouns are also usually feminine, especially those ending in -ail or -eil.

=== Number ===
Nouns show singular and plural number in Manx. Plurals can be formed from the singular by adding an ending, most often -yn (lioar "book", lioaryn "books"). Other endings include -aghyn, -ee, or a consonant followed by -yn. Sometimes a plural ending replaces a singular ending, as in the case of -agh becoming -ee or -eeyn or of -ee or -ey becoming -aghyn. Some mostly monosyllabic nouns pluralise by means of internal vowel change, such as mac "son" to mec, kayt "cat" to kiyt and dooiney "man" to deiney. Manx also has a handful of irregularly formed plurals, including ben "woman" to mraane, keyrey "sheep" to kirree and slieau "mountain" to sleityn.

=== Case ===
==== Nominative ====
The base form of a noun is in the nominative case (carrey "friend", caarjyn "friends").

==== Vocative ====
A nominative noun is lenited to become vocative, (charrey "friend!", chaarjyn "friends!"). This also extends to proper nouns. Moirrey, the Manx equivalent of the English name Mary, would be lenited to Voirrey, but this practice is less common for foreign names. This form is commonly used in greetings (Vax veen "dear Max").

==== Genitive ====
Some mostly feminine nouns possess a distinct genitive form, usually ending in -ey, e.g. bleeaney "of a year" (nominative: blein), coshey "of a foot" (nominative: cass). Historical genitive singulars often survive in compounds and fixed expressions although no longer productive, such as thie-ollee "cowhouse" using the old genitive of ollagh "cattle" or mullagh y ching "the crown", literally "the top of the head", employing lenited king "of a head" (nominative: kione). Keyrragh "of sheep" is the only distinct genitive plural, the nominative plural being kirree.

==== Dative ====
The dative case is encountered only in set expressions such as ry-chosh "on foot", where chosh is the lenited dative cosh "foot" (nominative: cass "foot").

== Articles ==
In common with the other Insular Celtic languages except Breton, Manx has a definite article but no indefinite article. The definite article takes the form yn before masculine nominative and genitive and feminine nominative nouns. This yn is often reduced to y before consonants or to 'n after grammatical words ending in a vowel. Plural nouns and feminine genitive nouns take the article ny, another archaic form of which is found in some place names as nyn.

== Adjectives ==
=== Number ===
Certain adjectives may be made plural by the addition of -ey to the singular form (ben veg "little woman", mraane veggey "little women"). In earlier versions of the language, these were used attributively, but are rarely employed in modern Manx.

=== Degree of comparison ===
Adjectives ending in -agh form their comparative/superlative form by replacing this with -ee, e.g. atçhimagh "terrible" becomes atçhimee, resulting in ny s'atçhimee "more terrible" and s'atçhimee "most terrible". As in Irish and Scottish Gaelic, the comparative-superlative is commonly marked by the copula verb s in the present and by in the past. The superlative is often shown by the word nys, from Middle Irish ní as "thing that is" (cf. Modern Irish níos, past ní ba). A number of adjectives form their comparative/superlative irregularly.

Irregular comparative/superlative forms of Manx adjectives
Positive	English	Comparative/Superlative
aalin	beautiful	aaley
aashag	easy	assey
aeg	young	aa
ard	high	yrjey
beg	small	loo
bog	soft, moist	buiggey
bwaagh	pretty	bwaaie
çheh	hot	çhoe
çhionn	tight, fast	çhenney
çhiu	thick	çhee
faggys	near	niessey
foddey	far, long	odjey
garroo	rough	girroo
gial	bright, white	gilley
giare	short	girrey
lajer	strong	troshey
leah	soon	leaie
lheann	wide	lea
liauyr	long, tall	lhiurey
mie	good	share
moal	slow	melley
mooar	large, big	moo
olk	bad, evil	messey
reagh	merry, lively	reaie
roauyr	fat, broad	riurey
shenn	old	shinney
thanney	thin	theinney
trome	heavy	thrimmey
ymmodee	many	lee

The comparative/superlative can also be formed using smoo "more" with the positive form, e.g. s'thrimmey = smoo trome.

== Verbs ==
=== Regular verbs ===
Manx verbs generally form their finite forms by means of periphrasis: inflected forms of the auxiliary verbs ve "to be" or jannoo "to do" are combined with the verbal noun of the main verb. Only the future, conditional, preterite and imperative can be formed directly by inflecting the main verb, but even in these tenses, the periphrastic formation is more common in Late Spoken Manx. An example using the forms of tilgey "throwing" is as follows.

Manx finite verb forms: tilgey "throwing"
Tense	Periphrastic form (literal translation)	Inflected form	Gloss
Present	ta mee tilgey ("I am throwing")	–	"I throw"
Imperfect	va mee tilgey ("I was throwing")	–	"I was throwing"
Perfect	ta mee er jilgey ("I am after throwing")	–	"I have thrown"
Pluperfect	va mee er jilgey ("I was after throwing")	–	"I had thrown"
Preterite	ren mee tilgey ("I did throwing")	hilg mee	"I threw"
Future	neeym tilgey ("I will do throwing")	tilgym	"I will throw"
Conditional	yinnin tilgey ("I would do throwing")	hilgin	"I would throw"
Imperative	jean tilgey ("do throwing!")	tilg	"throw!"
Past participle	–	tilgit	"thrown"

The future and conditional tenses (and in some irregular verbs, the preterite) make a distinction between "independent" and "dependent" forms. Independent forms are used when the verb is not preceded by any particle; dependent forms are used when a particle (e.g. cha "not") does precede the verb. For example, "you will lose" is caillee oo with the independent form caillee ("will lose"), while "you will not lose" is cha gaill oo with the dependent form caill (which has undergone eclipsis to gaill after cha). Similarly "they went" is hie ad with the independent form hie ("went"), while "they did not go" is cha jagh ad with the dependent form jagh.

The fully inflected forms of the regular verb tilgey "throwing" are as follows. In addition to the forms below, a past participle may be formed using -it: tilgit "thrown".

Inflection of a regular Manx verb
Tense	Independent	Dependent	Relative
Preterite	hilg	(same as independent)	
Future	tilgym^{1}, tilgmayd^{2}, tilgee^{3}	dilgym^{1}, dilgmayd^{2}, dilgee^{3}	tilgys
Conditional	tilgin^{1}, tilgagh^{3}	dilgin^{1}, dilgagh^{3}	
Imperative	tilg	(same as independent)	

^1 First person singular, making the use of a following subject pronoun redundant
^2First person plural, making the use of a following subject pronoun redundant
^3 Used with all other persons, meaning an accompanying subject must be stated, e.g. tilgee eh "he will throw", tilgee ad "they will throw"

There are a few peculiarities when a verb begins with a vowel, i.e. the addition of d' in the preterite and n' in the future and conditional dependent. Below is the conjugation of aase "to grow".

Inflection of a regular Manx verb beginning with a vowel
Tense	Independent	Dependent	Relative
Preterite	d'aase^{1}	(same as independent)	
Future	aasym, aasmayd, aasee	n'aasym, n'aasmayd, n'aasee	aasys
Conditional	aasin, aasagh	n'aasin, n'aasagh	
Imperative	aase	(same as independent)	

^1d' may also be spelt j when pronounced /dʲ/ [dʒ] i.e. before a slender vowel, e.g. "ate" can be either d'ee or jee.

These peculiarities extend to verbs beginning with f, e.g. faagail "to leave".

Inflection of a regular Manx verb beginning with f
Tense	Independent	Dependent	Relative
Preterite	d'aag^{1}	(same as independent)	
Future	faagym, faagmayd, faagee	vaagym, vaagmayd, vaagee, n'aagym, n'aagmayd, n'aagee	aagys
Conditional	aagin, aagagh	vaagin, vaagagh, n'aagin, n'aagagh	
Imperative	faag	(same as independent)	

^1Again, d' may also be spelt j where appropriate.

=== Irregular verbs ===
A number of verbs are irregular in their inflection.

Inflected forms of irregular Manx verbs
Infinitive	Preterite		Future		Conditional		Imperative	Past participle
Infinitive	Independent	Dependent	Independent	Dependent	Independent	Dependent	Imperative	Past participle
çheet "come"	haink	daink	higgym, higmayd, hig	jiggym, jigmayd, jig	harrin, harragh	darrin, darragh	tar	
clashtyn "hear"	cheayll	geayll	cluinnyn, cluinnee, cluinmayd^{1}	gluinnyn, gluinnee, gluinmayd	chluinnin, chluinnagh	gluinnin, gluinnagh	clasht	cluinit
cur "put, give"	hug	dug	verrym, vermayd, ver	derrym, dermayd, der	verrin, verragh	derrin, derragh	cur	currit
fakin "see"	honnick	vaik	hee'm, hemayd, hee	vaikym, vaikmyd, vaik	heein, heeagh	vaikin, vaikagh	jeeagh, cur-my-ner	faikinit
feddyn "find", geddyn "get"	hooar	dooar	yioym, yiowmayd, yiow	voym, vowmayd, vow	yioin, yioghe	voin, voghe	fow	feddinynt "found", geddinynt "given"
goll "go"	hie	jagh	hem, hemmayd, hed	jem, jemmayd, jed	raghin, ragh	(same as independent)	gow, immee	
gra "say"	dooyrt		jirrym, jirmayd, jir abbyrym, abbyrmyd, abbyr	jirrym, jirmayd, jir niarrym, niarmayd, niar n'abbyrym, n'abbyrmyd, n'abbyr	yiarrin, yiarragh	niarrin, niarragh	abbyr	grait
goaill "take"	ghow		goym, gowmayd, gowee^{2}	goym, gowmayd, gow	ghoin, ghoghe	goin, goghe	gow	goit
jean "do"	ren		nee'm, neemayd, nee	jeanym, jeanmayd, jean	yinnin, yinnagh	jinnin, jinnagh	jean	jeant

^1Future relative: clinnys
^2Future relative: gowee

The most common and most irregular verb in Manx is ve "to be", often used as an auxiliary verb. In addition to the usual inflected tenses, ve also has a present tense. The full conjugation of ve "to be" is as follows. Generally, the personal pronoun is used (ta mee "I am"), but the emphatic pronoun is also acceptable. For instance, row oo "were you?" is grammatically correct, but it is likely to be misheard in speech as row "was". As such, row uss is often used instead.

Forms of verb ve "to be"
Form	Independent	Dependent	Relative
Present	ta	vel, nel	–
Preterite	va	row	–
Future	bee'm, beemayd, bee	(same as independent)	vees
Conditional	veign, veagh	beign, beagh	–
Imperative	bee	(same as independent)	–

== Adverbs ==
Manx adverbs can be formed from adjectives by means of the word dy (from Middle Irish go "with, until"), e.g. mie "good" to dy mie "well", gennal "cheerful" to dy gennal "cheerfully". This dy is not used when preceded by such words as ro "too" and feer "very" or followed by dy liooar "enough", e.g. feer vie "very good, very well", gennal dy liooar "cheerful(ly) enough". The prepositional phrase for "home(wards)" is formed with dy "to" and the noun balley "place, town, homestead" to give dy valley, while the noun thie "house, home" can be used unchanged as an adverb to convey the same meaning.

=== Adverbs of location and motion ===
In common with its Goidelic sister languages, Manx has a number of adverbs corresponding to English "up" and "down", the meaning of which depend upon such things as motion or lack thereof and starting point in relation to the speaker.

Manx adverbs expressing "up" and "down"
	Stationary	Motion towards speaker	Motion away from speaker
above	heose	neose	seose
below	heese	neese	sheese

Examples of practical usage are Ta dooinney heese y traid "There's a man down the street" and Ta mee goll sheese y traid "I'm going down the street", Jean drappal neese "Climb up (towards me)" and Jean drappal seose "Climb up (away from me)".

Likewise, Manx possesses various other single words that distinguish between stationary location and direction or movement towards or away from the speaker, e.g. shiar "to the east, eastwards" and niar "from the east", sthie "in, inside" (location) and stiagh "in, inside" (direction), wass "this side, here", noon "from this side, to the other side" and noal "over to this side, over to the other side".

== Pronouns ==
=== Personal ===
Technically, Manx has a T-V distinction where the second person singular pronoun oo is used to show familiarity while the second person plural shiu is used as a respectful singular as well as with plural referents. Because of the solidarity of the small speech community, however, Manx speakers would automatically use oo when addressing another individual Manx speaker.

In common with Irish and Scottish Gaelic, in addition to its regular personal pronouns, Manx has also a series used for emphasis. Under certain phonological circumstances, these can be used as unemphatic pronouns, e.g. "you were not" is cha row uss [xa ˈrau ʊs] as cha row oo [xa ˈrau u(ː)] sounds too similar to cha row [xa ˈrau] "was not".

Manx personal pronouns
Person		Regular	Emphatic
First singular		mee	mish
Second singular		oo	uss
Third singular	masculine	eh	eshyn
Third singular	feminine	ee	ish
First plural		shin	shinyn
Second plural		shiu	shiuish
Third plural		ad	adsyn

Reflexive pronouns are formed with the addition of -hene, which can also indicate emphasis, e.g. mee-hene "myself", oo-hene "yourself".

=== Interrogative ===
Manx interrogative pronouns include quoi "who?", cre "what?" and c'red "what?".

=== Indefinite ===
The Manx equivalent of English "-ever" or "any-" is erbee, e.g. quoi erbee "whoever, anyone". Ennagh is used like English "some-", e.g. peiagh ennagh "someone" (with peiagh "person").

== Determiners ==
=== Possessive ===
A gender distinction is made in the third person singular by means of lenition following masculine e "his, its" and lack of lenition after feminine e "her, its".

Manx possessive determiners
		singular	plural
1st person		my	nyn
2nd person		dty	nyn
3rd person	masculine	e	nyn
3rd person	feminine	e	nyn

An alternative to using the possessive pronouns is to precede a noun with the definite article and follow it with the inflected form of ec "at" to show the person, e.g. yn thie aym "my house" (literally "the house at me") instead of my hie "my house". This is especially useful in the plural, where all persons share one possessive pronoun, e.g. yn thie oc "their house", as opposed to nyn dhie "our/your/their house".

Possessive determiners are used to indicate the object of a verbnoun, e.e. T'eh dy my akin "He sees me". E is dropped after the particle dy, although the mutation or lack thereof remains, and dy combines with nyn to give dyn, e.g. T'eh dy akin "He sees him", T'eh dy fakin "He sees her", T'eh dyn vakin "He sees us/you/them".

== Prepositions ==
Like the other Insular Celtic languages, Manx has so-called inflected prepositions, contractions of a preposition with a pronominal direct object, as the following common prepositions show. Note the sometimes identical form of the uninflected preposition and its third person singular masculine inflected form.

Conjugation of Manx prepositions using pronominal ending
	Singular				Plural		
	1st person	2nd person	3rd person		1st person	2nd person	3rd person
	1st person	2nd person	masc.	fem.	1st person	2nd person	3rd person
ass "out of"	assym	assyd	ass	assjee	assdooin	assdiu	assdoo, assdaue
ayns "in"	aynym	aynyd	ayn	aynjee	ayn, ayndooin	ayndiu	ayndoo, ayndaue
da "to"	dou	dhyt	da	jee^{2}	dooin	diu	daue
dys, gys^{1} "to"	hym	hood	huggey	huic(k)	hooin	hiu	huc
ec "at"	aym	ayd	echey	eck	ain	orroo	oc
er "on"	orrym	ort	er	urree	orrin	erriu	orroo
fo "under"	foym	foyd	fo	foee	foin	feue	foue
gollrish "like"	gollrym	gollryt	gollrish	gollree	gollrin	gollriu	gollroo
harrish "over"	harrym	harryd	harrish	harree	harrin	harriu	harroo, harrystoo
jeh "of"	jeem	jeed	jeh	j'ee^{2}	jin	jiu	jeu
lesh "with"	lhiam	lhiat	lesh	lhee	lhien	lhiu	lhieu
marish "with"^{3}	marym	mayrt	marish	maree	marin	meriu	maroo
mysh "about"	moom	mood	mysh	mooee	mooin	miu	moo, mymboo
rish "to"^{4}	rhym	rhyt	rish	r'ee^{5}	rooin	riu	roo
roish "before"	roym	royd	roish	roee, rhymbee	roin	reue	roue, rhymboo
shaghey "past"	shaghym	shaghyd	shaghey	shaghee	shaghin	shaghiu	shaghoo
veih, voish "from"	voym	voyd	voish, veih	voee	voin	veue	voue

^1Dys is the usual word today. Gys is literary. This is also the inflection of hug "to".
^2J'ee "of her" is distinguished from homophonous jee "to her" in spelling by means of an apostrophe.
^3Sometimes, these forms, apart from mayrt are written with a circumflex over the first vowel, e.g. mârish, mêriu.
^4Rish is equivalent to various different prepositions in English depending on context, e.g. clashtyn rish "listen to", caggey rish "fight against", rish tammylt " for a while".
^5The spelling r'ee distinguishes it from the homophonic noun ree "king".

In addition to the above "simple" prepositions, Manx has a number of prepositional phrases based on a noun; being based on nouns, the possessive personal pronouns are used to refer to what would in English be pronominal prepositional objects. This also happens in English phrases such as "for my sake".

Conjugation of Manx prepositional phrases using possessive pronouns
	1st person singular	2nd person singular	3rd person singular		Plural
	1st person singular	2nd person singular	masc.	fem.	Plural
erskyn "above"	er-my-skyn	er-dty-skyn	er-e-skyn	er-e-skyn	er-nyn-skyn
mychione "concerning"	my-my-chione	my-dty-chione	my-e-chione	my-e-kione	my-nyn-gione
son "for the sake of"	er-my-hon	er-dty-hon	er-e-hon	er-e-son	er-nyn-son
lurg "after"	my lurg	dty lurg	e lurg	e lurg	nyn lurg
noi "against"	m'oi	dt'oi	n'oi	ny hoi	nyn oi
trooid "through"	my hrooid	dty hrooid	e trooid	urree	nyn drooid

Alternative conjugation patterns are sometimes found with these more complex prepositions using inflected prepositions, e.g. mychione aym for my-my-chione "concerning me", son ain "for our sake" instead of er-nyn-son "for our/your/their sake".

== Conjunctions ==
The main coordinating conjunctions in Manx are as "and", agh "but" and ny "or". Subordinating conjunctions include choud('s) "while", derrey "until", dy "that; so that", er-y-fa "because", ga dy/nagh "although (affirmative/negative)" and tra "when". My "if" introduces conditional clauses as do myr "as if" and mannagh "unless".

== Numbers ==
Manx numbers are traditionally vigesimal, as seen below. Some speakers use a more modern decimal version of some numbers, in a similar way to Irish and Scottish Gaelic, for example, to simplify the teaching of arithmetic.

Manx numbers
Value	Cardinal		Ordinal
Value	Traditional	Modern	Ordinal
0	neunhee, veg		
1	un, nane^{1}		chied
2	daa, jees^{1}		nah
3	tree		trass
4	kiare		kiarroo
5	queig		queigoo
6	shey		sheyoo
7	shiaght		shiaghtoo
8	hoght		hoghtoo
9	nuy		nuyoo
10	jeih		jeihoo
11	nane jeig		nane jeigoo
12	daa yeig		daa yeigoo
13	tree jeig		trass jeig
14	kiare jeig		kiarroo jeig
15	queig jeig		queiggoo jeig
16	shey jeig		sheyoo jeig
17	shiaght jeig		shiaghtoo jeig
18	hoght jeig		hoghtoo jeig
19	nuy jeig		nuyoo jeig
20	feedoo		kiare
21	nane as feed	feed-nane	chied as feed
22	daa as feed	feed-jees	nah as feed
23	tree as feed	feed-tree	trass as feed
30	jeih as feed	treead	jeihoo as feed
31	nane jeig as feed	treead-nane	chied jeig as feed
32	daa yeig as feed	treead-jees	nah jeig as feed
33	tree jeig as feed	treead-tree	trass jeig as feed
40	daeed	kiarad	daeedoo
50	jeih as daeed, lieh cheead	queigad	jeihoo as daeed
60	tree feed	sheyad	tree feedoo
70	tree feed as jeih	shiaghtad	tree feedoo as jeih
80	kiare feed	hoghtad	kiare feedoo
90	tree feed as jeih	nuyad	tree feedoo as jeih
100	keead		keeadoo
1,000	jeih keead, milley, thousane		jeih cheeadoo, millioo, thousaneoo
1,000,000	millioon		millioonoo

^1Un and daa are used for counting objects (daa ghooinney "two men"). Nane and jees mean "number one" and "number two" in a more abstract, mathematical sense, and are used for phone numbers and arithmetic.
