= William Williams (Caledfryn) =

Caledfryn
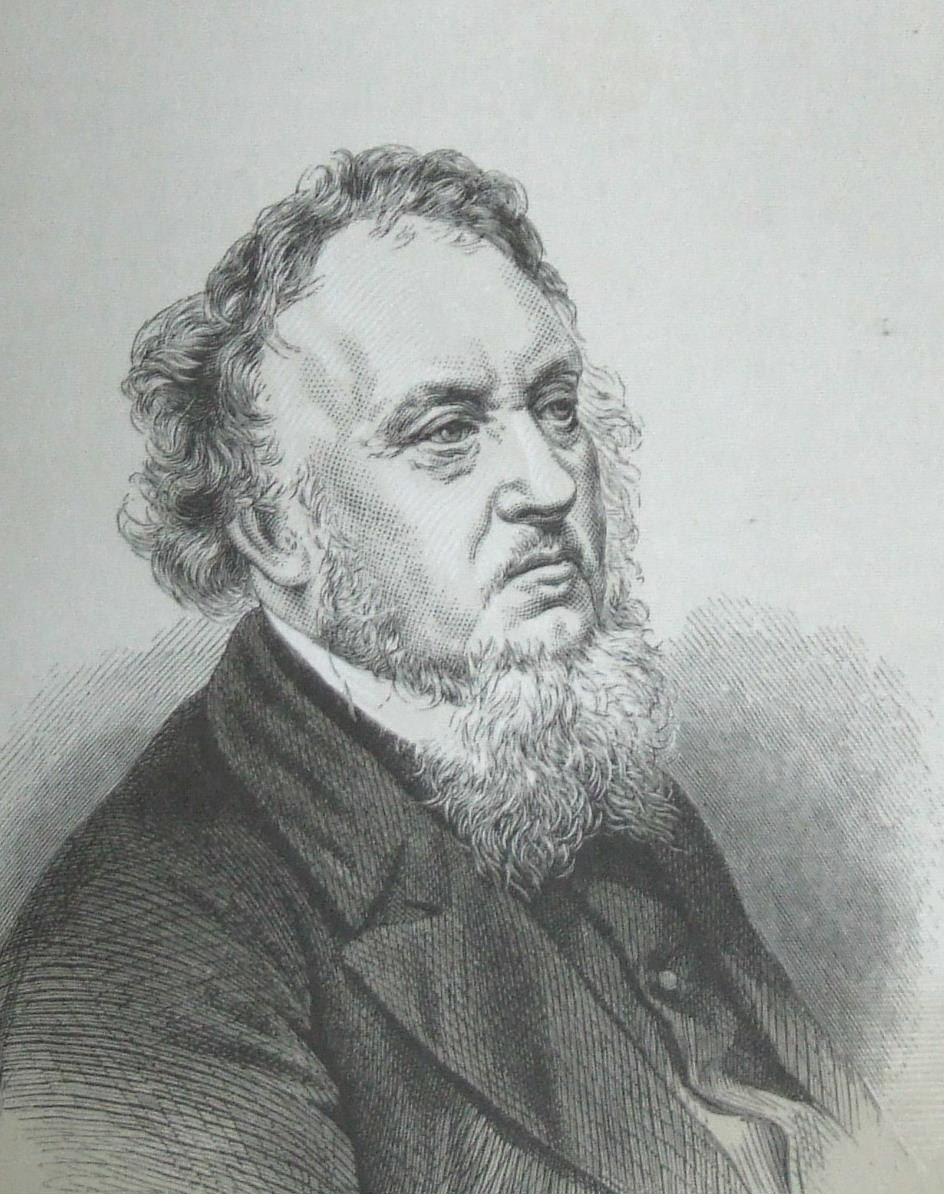
- Engraving from Ceinion Llenyddiaeth Gymreig (1876)
- Born: William Williams; 6 February 1801; Bryn y Ffynnon, Denbigh, Denbighshire, Wales
- Died: 23 March 1869 (aged 68); Groes-wen, Glamorgan
- Occupations: Minister, poet, writer, editor
- Writing career
- Years active: 1820s - 1860s

William Williams (pen name "Caledfryn" or "Gwilym Caledfryn") (6 February 1801 – 23 March 1869) was a Welsh Congregational minister, poet and literary critic born at Bryn y Ffynnon, Denbigh. He was one of the leading figures in the Welsh Eisteddfod movement and did much to raise the standards of Welsh literature of his time.

== Biography ==
He was from a family of weavers at Bryn y Ffynnon. He studied at Rotherham College before becoming ordained as a minister with the Independents in 1829. He was a prominent member of the Anti-Corn Law League, the Peace Society and the Society for the Liberation of Religion which sought to separate the church from the state.

He tried to standardize Welsh as a literary language and wrote a number of articles and criticisms on Welsh poetry, becoming popular in the first half of the 19th century. In 1851 he published Grammadeg Cymreig, an important book of Welsh grammar.

From 1831 to 1868 he served as an editor for numerous Welsh periodicals. He published Cyfarwyddiadur i Ddarllen ac Ysgrifennu Cymraeg ("A Guide to reading and writing Welsh" in 1821; Grawn Awen, a volume of verse in 1826; and Drych Barddonol neu Draethawd ar Farddoniaeth (an essay on Poetry) in 1839.

He spent the last days of his life in South Wales as minister at Groeswen Independent Chapel, near Cardiff in Glamorgan.

== Literary work ==
=== Poetry ===
- Grawn Awen (1826)
- Caniadau Caledfryn (1856)
