= Welsh numerals =

Counting system of the Welsh language

The traditional counting system used in the Welsh language is vigesimal, i.e. based on twenties where numbers from 11 to 14 are "1–4 on ten", 16–19 are "1–4 on fifteen" (though 18 is more commonly "two nines"); numbers from 21 to 39 are "1–19 on twenty", 40 is "two twenty", 60 is "three twenty", etc.

There is also a decimal counting system, where numbers are "x ten y" unit(s), e.g. thirty-five (35) in decimal is tri deg pump (three ten five) while in vigesimal it is pymtheg ar hugain (fifteen – itself "five-ten" – on twenty).

== Cardinal numbers ==
Number	Vigesimal system	Decimal system
0	sero/dim	
1	un	
2	dau (m), dwy (f)	
3	tri (m), tair (f)	
4	pedwar (m), pedair (f)	
5	pum(p)	
6	chwe(ch)	
7	saith	
8	wyth	
9	naw	
10	deg/un deg, deng	
11	un ar ddeg ("one on ten")	un deg un
12	deuddeg, deuddeng	un deg dau/dwy
13	tri/tair ar ddeg	un deg tri/tair
14	pedwar/pedair ar ddeg	un deg pedwar/pedair
15	pymtheg, pymtheng	un deg pump
16	un ar bymtheg ("one on fifteen")	un deg chwech
17	dau/dwy ar bymtheg	un deg saith
18	deunaw/tri/tair ar bymtheg ("two nines"/"three on fifteen")	un deg wyth
19	pedwar/pedair ar bymtheg	un deg naw
20	ugain	dau ddeg
21	un ar hugain ("one on twenty")	dau ddeg un
22	dau/dwy ar hugain	dau ddeg dau/dwy
23	tri/tair ar hugain	dau ddeg tri/tair
24	pedwar/pedair ar hugain	dau ddeg pedwar/pedair
25	pump ar hugain	dau ddeg pump
etc.
30	deg ar hugain ("ten on twenty")	tri deg
31	un ar ddeg ar hugain	tri deg un
32	deuddeg ar hugain	tri deg dau/dwy
40	deugain ("two twenty")	pedwar deg
41	deugain ac un ("two twenty and one")	pedwar deg un
50	hanner cant/deg a deugain ("half a hundred"/"ten and forty")	pum deg
51	un ar ddeg a deugain	pum deg un hanner cant ac un
60	trigain ("three twenty")	chwe deg
61	trigain ac un	chwe deg un
70	deg a thrigain ("ten and three twenty")	saith deg
71	un ar ddeg a thrigain ("one on ten and three twenty")	saith deg un
80	pedwar ugain ("four twenty")	wyth deg
81	pedwar ugain ac un	wyth deg un
90	deg a phedwar ugain ("ten and four twenty")	naw deg
91	un ar ddeg a phedwar ugain ("one on ten and four twenty")	naw deg un
100	can(t)	
200	dau gant	
300	tri chant	
400	pedwar cant	
500	pum cant	
600	chwe chant	
700	saith cant	
800	wyth cant	
900	naw cant	
1000	mil	
2000	dwy fil	
1,000,000	miliwn	
1,000,000,000	biliwn	
1,000,000,000,000	triliwn	

== Ordinal numbers ==
Despite a decimal system being used for cardinal numbers, there are no common ordinal numbers based on a decimal system, although "-fed" can be used as a suffix on the decimal numbers (e.g. "un deg unfed" for 11th), it is not generally accepted formally.

Number	Ordinal
0fed	dimfed
1af	cyntaf/unfed
2ail	ail
3ydd	trydydd (m), trydedd (f)
4ydd	pedwerydd (m), pedwaredd (f)
5ed	pumed
6ed	chweched
7fed	seithfed
8fed	wythfed
9fed	nawfed
10fed	degfed
11eg	unfed ar ddeg
12fed	deuddegfed/ail ar ddeg
13eg	trydydd ar ddeg (m), trydedd ar ddeg (f)
14eg	pedwerydd ar ddeg (m), pedwaredd ar ddeg (f)
15fed	pymthegfed
16eg	unfed ar bymtheg
17eg	ail ar bymtheg
18fed	deunawfed
19eg	pedwerydd ar bymtheg (m), pedwaredd ar bymtheg (f)
20fed	ungeinfed
21ain	unfed ar hugain
22ain	ail ar hugain
23ain	trydydd ar hugain (m), trydedd ar hugain (f)
24ain	pedwerydd ar hugain (m), pedwaredd ar hugain (f)
25ain	pumed ar hugain
30ain	degfed ar hugain
31ain	unfed ar ddeg ar hugain
32ain	deuddegfed ar hugain
40fed	deugainfed
50fed	hannercanfed/degfed ar ddeugain
60fed	trigainfed
70fed	degfed ar trigain
80fed	pedwar ugeinfed (m), pedair ugeinfed (f)
90fed	degfed a phedwar ugain (m), degfed a phedair ugain (f)
100fed	canfed
200fed	dau ganfed
1,000fed	milfed
2,000fed	dwy filfed
10,000fed	deng milfed
100,000fed	can milfed
1,000,000fed	miliynfed
1,000,000,000fed	biliynfed

== Variation in form ==
There is some syntactically and phonologically triggered variation in the form of numerals. There are, for example, masculine and feminine forms of the numbers "two" (dau and dwy), "three" (tri and tair) and "four" (pedwar and pedair), which must agree with the grammatical gender of the objects being counted. The numerals for "five", "six" and "hundred" (pump, chwech and cant) also have reduced forms (pum, chwe, can) when they precede the object they are counting. The words for "ten", "twelve", and "fifteen" (deg, un deg dau/deuddeg, un deg pump/pymtheg) have the alternative forms deng, deuddeng, pymtheng used before nasals (which may be the result of mutation) and, occasionally, vowels; these forms are becoming less common. Numerals change as expected according to normal rules of consonant mutation; some also trigger mutation in some following words (see below for details).

== Use of the decimal system ==
The decimal system is widely used, but is rather uncommon for dates and ages. Larger numbers, however, tend to be expressed in this system e.g. 1,965 mil, naw cant chwe deg pump. In referring to years, on the other hand, the number of thousands is stated, followed by the individual digits, e.g. 1965 mil naw chwe(ch) pump. This system appears to have broken down for years after 2000, e.g. whereas 1905 is mil naw dim pump, 2005 is dwy fil a phump.

The Welsh decimal counting system was devised by 19th-century Patagonian Welsh businessmen in Argentina for accountancy purposes. It was recommended to teachers for use in the first Welsh language schools in Patagonia by Richard Jones Berwyn in a book published in 1878. The system was later adopted in Wales in the late 1940s with the beginning of Welsh-medium education.

== Use with nouns and mutations ==
The singular form of the noun is used with numbers, but for larger numbers an alternative form is permitted, where o ("of") with the plural noun follows the number. Except where using this plural form, the noun is placed directly after the number but before any parts of the number that are added using ar ("on") in the traditional system.

Nouns are also mutated following many numbers. Un triggers the soft mutation (treiglad meddal) of feminine nouns, other than those beginning with "ll" and "rh", but not masculine nouns. Dau and dwy both trigger the soft mutation (ll and rh included). Tri (but not tair) and chwe trigger the aspirate mutation. Several higher numbers (pum, saith, wyth, deng, deuddeng, and pymtheng) trigger the nasal mutation when used with blynedd ("year(s)"). The part of the number immediately preceding the noun will determine any mutation of the noun. In the plural form with o, the soft mutation is used as is normal after o.

The numbers "deg" (ten), "cant" (hundred), and "biliwn" (billion) are masculine, and "mil" (thousand) and "miliwn" (million) are feminine, and the forms of the numbers above must therefore correspond with these (e.g. "dau ddeg", "dau gant", "dau filiwn", and "dwy fil", "dwy filiwn"), this also distinguishes between "(2) biliwn" and "(2) miliwn" which both mutate to "filiwn".

The following example illustrates several of these points:

English	Thirty-six dogs
Traditional system	Un ci ar bymtheg ar hugain One dog on fifteen on twenty
Traditional system	Un ar bymtheg ar hugain o gŵn One on fifteen on twenty of dogs
Decimal system	Tri deg chwe chi Three ten six dog
Decimal system	Tri deg chwech o gŵn Three ten six of dogs
