= Welsh syntax =

Grammatical syntax of the Welsh language

The syntax of the Welsh language has much in common with the syntax of other Insular Celtic languages. It is, for example, heavily right-branching (including a verb–subject–object word order), and the verb for be (in Welsh, bod) is crucial to constructing many different types of clauses. Any verb may be inflected for three tenses (preterite, future, and unreality), and a range of additional tenses are constructed with auxiliary verbs and particles. Welsh lacks true subordinating conjunctions, and instead relies on special verb forms and preverbal particles to create subordinate clauses.

There are at least four registers or varieties of Welsh that the term Modern Welsh is used to describe. There is Biblical Welsh, which is archaic and not part of colloquial usage, although some educated Welsh speakers are familiar with it. Two more registers are Literary Welsh and Colloquial Welsh; this article primarily describes Colloquial Welsh, except where noted. Finally, there are also a number of other dialects which diverge from these three varieties of Welsh. These various dialects are understudied, with the exception of some research by Awbery (1990).

== Word order ==
=== Verb–subject–object word order ===
Welsh is a language with verb-initial word order, the usual word order being verb–subject–object (VSO).

In addition to a verb and a subject, which are obligatory in a canonical clause, Welsh typically organizes additional information as follows:

Preverbal particle — Verb — Subject — Direct object — Indirect object — Adverbials (prepositional phrase, adverb, etc.)

Preverbal particle	Verb	Subject	Negator	Direct object		Adverbial (prepositional phrase)			Adverbial (adverb)
Mi	roddais	i		lyfr	da	i	dad	Eleri	ddoe.
AFF	give.1SG.PST	PRN.1SG		MUT-book	good	to-PREP	MUT-father	Eleri	yesterday
'I gave Eleri's father a good book yesterday.'
Ni	roddais	i	ddim	llyfr	da	i	dad	Eleri	ddoe.
NEG	give.1SG.PST	PRN.1SG	NEG	MUT-book	good	to-PREP	MUT-father	Eleri	yesterday
'I did not give Eleri's father a good book yesterday.'
A	roddais	i		lyfr	da	i	dad	Eleri	ddoe?
INTERR	give.1SG.PST	PRN.1SG		MUT-book	good	to-PREP	MUT-father	Eleri	yesterday
'Did I give Eleri's father a good book yesterday?'

The syntactic analysis of the VSO word order of Welsh is currently under debate. Richard Sproat and Ian Roberts have argued for an underlying subject–verb–object (SVO) word order with the surface VSO word order derived by syntactic movement of the verb to a higher position in the clause. On the other hand, Robert Borsley has argued against an underlying SVO analysis.

==== In favour of an underlying SVO analysis ====
The arguments that Roberts makes about Welsh syntax are largely based on data from the Literary Welsh dialect.

The first step in the argument that Roberts makes for an underlying SVO analysis of Welsh word order is to argue that the subject moves out of the verb phrase to a position higher in the clause. This argument is made on the basis of data from passives, unaccusatives, and raising predicates in Welsh. The derived subjects in all three of these constructions behave like subjects of other predicates in Welsh in that they cannot be separated from the verb. That is, the subject must immediately follow the verb, as can be seen in (1)–(3).

(1) Welsh passive

Cafodd y dyn ei ladd.
got the man his killing
'The man was killed.'

* Cafodd ddoe y dyn ei ladd.
{} got yesterday the man his killing
'The man was killed yesterday.'

(2) Welsh unaccusative

Diflanodd y dyn.
disappeared the man
'The man disappeared.'

* Diflanodd ddoe y dyn.
{} disappeared yesterday the man
'The man disappeared yesterday.'

(3) Welsh raising predicate

Mae Gwyn yn siŵr o fod yma
is Gwyn in sure from be here
'Gwyn is sure to be here.'

* Mae yfory Gwyn yn siŵr o fod yma
{} is tomorrow Gwyn in sure from be here
'Gwyn is sure to be here tomorrow.'

This suggests that the subjects in these three constructions are true subjects. On the assumption that all subjects in the language occupy the same position in the clause, this entails that the subject in Welsh must raise to a higher position in the clause than where it was base generated.

Another argument for movement of the subject in Welsh comes from reconstruction effects. Andrew Barss noticed that there is an interpretive difference between (4a) and (4b).

(4)	a.	[Which pictures of himself_{i/j}] does John_{i} think that Bill_{j} would like e
	b.	[Criticize himself_{*i/j}], John_{i} thinks Bill_{j} never would e

In (4a), himself can be interpreted as either coreferential with John or Bill. However, in (4b), it can only be interpreted as coreferential with Bill.

Cheng-Teh Huang analyzes these English facts by adopting the VP-Internal Subject Hypothesis and assuming that the subject raises from the verb phrase to a position higher in the clause. That is to say, the structure of (4b) is what is given in (5).

(5)	[t_{i} criticize himself_{i}], John thinks Bill_{i} never would e

The closest c-commanding element that binds the reflexive pronoun, himself, is the trace of Bill (see Principle/Condition A of the binding (linguistics) theory).

The facts in Welsh parallel the facts in English. Specifically, the reflexive in (6a) can be interpreted as coreferential with either John or Bill, whereas the reflexive in (6b) can only be interpreted as coreferential with Bill.

[Pa luniau ohono'i hun_{i/j}] y mae John_{i} yn credu y mae Bill_{j} yn eu hoffi
which pictures of-his self PTCL is John PTCL believe PTCL is Bill PTCL their like
'Which pictures of himself does John believe Bill likes?'

[Siarad â’i hun_{*i/j}] y mae John_{i} yn meddwl bod Bill_{j}
speak with-his self PTCL is John PTCL think that-is Bill
'Talk to himself, John thinks Bill does.'

The most straightforward analysis of these facts is to adopt the same analysis that Huang gives for English. That is to say, if one adopts the VP-internal subject hypothesis and assumes that the subject raises to a higher position in the clause, then an account of these facts is straightforward. Moreover, this suggests that the underlying word order is indeed SVO.

The second step in the argument that Roberts gives to motivate an analysis of Welsh word order in which the underlying structure of the clause is SVO and the verb has moved to a higher position in the clause is to observe that the verb appears in a higher position than the subject. If the subject has raised from a VP-internal position, then it follows that the verb must have also raised in order to be in a higher clausal position and to show up to the immediate left of the subject.

==== Against an underlying SVO analysis ====
On the other hand, Borsley has argued against an underlying SVO analysis with the surface word order derived by verb movement. One of the arguments that he gives against such an analysis is based on negation. In Welsh, the negative adverb ddim cannot be immediately followed by an object noun phrase, as the following examples show.

* Welodd Siôn ddim y defaid
{} saw Siôn NEG the sheep
'Siôn did not see the sheep.'

* Fytodd hi ddim y siocled {hyd yn oed}
{} ate she NEG the chocolate even
'She didn’t eat the chocolate even.'

Fytodd hi ddim {hyd yn oed} y siocled
ate she NEG even the chocolate
'She didn’t eat the chocolate even.'

Borsley claims that this means the Welsh grammar must have a constraint against ddim appearing next to an object noun phrase. He further argues that it would not be possible to state such a constraint since ddim is not underlyingly next to the object noun phrase if one adopts an underlyingly SVO analysis of Welsh.

Note that Borsley takes the ddim of a sentence like Welson ni ddim ci "We didn't see a dog" not to be this negative adverb, but a homophonous negative quantifier.

=== Focus ===
Welsh has a highly developed system of fronting constituents in focus in which parts of a sentence can be moved to the front for emphasis, rather than stressing them phonetically as English does. Most elements of a sentence can be moved to sentence-initial position.

Yng Nghaerdydd mae hi'n byw (mae hi'n byw yng Nghaerdydd) – 'She lives in Cardiff'
Ioan mae hi'n ei garu (mae hi'n caru Ioan) – 'She loves Ioan'

The subject of a verb causes a soft mutation.

Fi roddodd lyfr da i dad Eleri (rhoddais i lyfr da i dad Eleri) – 'I gave a good book to Eleri's father'

Sentence elements following yn, such as verbnouns, lose the yn when moved initially:

Bwyta sglodion oeddwn i (roeddwn i'n bwyta sglodion) – 'I was eating chips'

== Nominal syntax ==
Determiners precede the noun they modify, while adjectives generally follow it. A modifier that precedes its head noun often causes a mutation, and adjectives following a feminine noun are lenited. Thus:

- dogfen 'a document'
- y ddogfen 'the document' (dogfen is lenited because it is feminine)
- hen ddogfen 'an old document' (dogfen is lenited because hen 'old' precedes it)
- dogfen fer 'a short document' (ber (feminine form of byr) is lenited because it follows a feminine noun)

Genitive relationships are expressed by apposition. The genitive in Welsh is formed by putting two noun phrases next to each other, the possessor coming second. So English The cat's mother, or mother of the cat, corresponds to Welsh mam y gath – literally, 'mother the cat'; 'the project manager's phone number' is rhif ffôn rheolwr y prosiect – literally, 'number phone manager the project'. Only the last noun in a genitive sequence can take the definite article.

== Verbal syntax ==
=== Syntax with bod ===
Bod "be" is used for a number of constructions, including equating two noun phrases, using adjectives predicatively, and forming a wide range of grammatical tenses.

==== Noun and adjective complements ====
One way to equate noun phrases is to use what Gareth King calls "identification" forms of bod, with the word order NP_{1} – bod – NP_{2}.

Diffoddwr tân ydy Gwyn.
'Gwyn is a fireman.'

Alternatively, a verb-initial word order may be used, with the "affirmative forms" of bod and a particle yn which triggers the soft mutation: bod – NP_{1} – yn+SM – NP_{2}. This construction has both interrogative and negative variations which utilize different verb-forms and require, in the case of the negative, the addition of ddim "not".

Mae Gwyn yn ddiffoddwr tân.
'Gwyn is a fireman.'

Ydy Gwyn yn ddiffoddwr tân?
'Is Gwyn a fireman?'

Dydy Gwyn ddim yn ddiffoddwr tân.
'Gwyn isn't a fireman.'

The predicative adjective construction uses this same verb-initial construction: bod – NP – yn+SM – adjective.

Mae Gwyn yn ddiflas.
'Gwyn is miserable.'

Ydy Gwyn yn ddiflas?
'Is Gwyn miserable?'

Dydy Gwyn ddim yn ddiflas.
'Gwyn isn't miserable.'

==== Verb complements ====
In addition to the inflected preterite, future, and conditional tense forms, Bod–subject–yn–verbnoun (with no mutation) is used to express a range of other times:

- Present:

Mae bws yn dod.
'A bus is coming.'

- Imperfect:

Roedd bws yn dod.
'A bus was coming.'

- Future:

Bydd bws yn dod.
'A bus will be coming.'

- Conditional:

Byddai bws yn dod.
'A bus would be coming.'

- Subjunctive:

Pe bai bws yn dod.
'If a bus were coming.'

While the present and imperfect have special interrogative and negative forms, the future and conditional forms:

- form questions by leniting the verb, and
- form negative statements by adding ddim after the subject, and optionally leniting the verb.

All of these bod constructions may be given perfect meaning by replacing yn with wedi (lit. "after"), while substituting newydd (lit. "newly") for wedi (together with lenition of the verbnoun) expresses what may be termed the immediate perfect ("has just", etc.). Thus:

- Mae Siân yn mynd – 'Siân is going'
- Mae Siân wedi mynd – 'Siân has gone'
- Mae Siân newydd fynd – 'Siân has just gone'

=== Syntax without bod ===
Welsh has inflected preterite, future, and conditional tenses. These do not take any particle such as yn, but instead soft mutation occurs after the subject: Welson ni gi? 'We saw a dog' (where gi is the lenited form of ci 'dog'). In negative sentences the soft mutation is instead placed on dim "not": Welson ni ddim ci 'We didn't see a dog'.

Questions are formed the same way as with the future and conditional bod forms above, as are negative statements except when there is a specific noun phrase functioning as the direct object. A specific noun phrase is a pronoun (fi, nhw, etc.), a definite noun (yr ardal, y ffilm, etc.), or a noun preceded by a definite adjective (fy nhad, ei chalon hi, etc.). In these cases, ddim is replaced by mo (a contraction of ddim o). Thus:

- Ffeindies i ddim poteli 'I didn't find any bottles', but Ffeindies i mo'r poteli 'I didn't find the bottles'
- Welodd hi mo Siôn 'She didn't see Siôn', but Welodd hi mohono fo 'She didn't see him' (mo, like o, must inflect for pronominal objects)

The preterite, future, and conditional can also be formed with the appropriate inflected tense of gwneud 'to do' with a verbal noun (again with soft mutation after the subject). The preterite may also be formed with ddaru (which is the third person singular preterite of darfod 'to happen'), which does not alter its form.

For affirmative statements with inflected verbs, it is particularly common to attach mi or fe, preverbal particles which trigger the soft mutation:

Mi brynes i gar newydd.
'I bought a new car.'

The passive voice can be expressed with the verb cael 'get' followed by the verb noun modified by a possessive adjective. For example:

Cafodd Susie ei gweld.
'Susie was seen'. (lit. 'Susie got her seeing', cf. English Susie got seen).

The agent is introduced with the preposition gan 'with, by'. A "static passive", expressing the result of an action, can be expressed with the verb bod 'to be' followed by the preposition wedi 'after' and, again, the verbal noun modified by possessive adjective. For example:

Mae'r ddinas wedi'i dinistrio.
'The city is destroyed'. (lit. 'The city is after its destroying')

The prepositional phrase can also be used attributively:

llythyr wedi'i agor
'an opened letter' (lit. 'a letter after its opening')

The construction can be negated by replacing wedi with heb 'without'.

== Subordination ==
=== Relative clauses ===
There are two relative pronouns in Welsh, a and y. a (which causes soft mutation) is used in "direct" relative clauses, i.e. those where the relativised element is the subject of its clause or the direct object of an inflected verb (rather than a periphrastic construction with bod):

y dyn a welais i – 'the man that I saw'
y dyn a welodd fi – 'the man that saw me'

a cannot coexist with mae. Instead, a special form, sydd or sy, is used:

y dyn sy'n hapus – 'the man who's happy'

In all other cases, known as "indirect" relative clauses – those where the relativised element is genitival or the object of a preposition – , y, the complementizer, is used.

y dyn y gwrandawais i arno fo – 'the man that I listened to'
y dyn y cafodd ei fam ei charcharu – 'the man whose mother was imprisoned'

Note that because the object of a verbal noun is genitival, all periphrastic constructions take y.

y dyn y mae hi'n ei adnabod – 'the man she knows'

In the colloquial language, both a and y are typically omitted, and soft mutation occurs in both types of relative clause:

y fenyw werthodd Ieuan y ceffyl iddi – 'the woman that Ieuan sold the horse to'

which in more formal Welsh would be

y wraig y gwerthodd Ieuan y ceffyl iddi – 'the woman that Ieuan sold the horse to'

=== Complementization ===
==== Syntactic complementization ====
Welsh has a number of complementizers used under different circumstances. y is used in non-focused affirmative clauses other than the present periphrastic with bod:

Mae hi'n gwybod y bydd hi'n dod. – 'She knows she's coming.'
Ydy o'n meddwl yr elai hi i Gaerdydd? – 'Does he think she would go to Cardiff?'

Affirmative clauses with the main verb in the preterite are an exception. The construction with y is ungrammatical in many spoken dialects (as well as in the literary language), and a construction based on the preposition i and the verbnoun is used instead:

Ydy o'n meddwl iddi hi fynd i Gaerdydd? – 'Does he think she went to Cardiff?'

The present periphrastic with bod tends to use a construction with the verbnoun bod in a genitival construction with the subject of the subordinate clause:

Rwy'n teimlo eich bod chi'n anhapus. – 'I feel that you are unhappy.' (lit. 'I am feeling your being unhappy')

Negative clauses can be made negative normally or by replacing y with na:

Mi welith hi [fy] mod i ddim yn anhapus. = Mi welith hi na dydw i ddim yn anhapus. – 'She will see that I'm not unhappy.'
Gwn i yr eith hi ddim. = Gwn i nad eith hi. – 'I know she won't go.'

Focused clauses are complementized with mai (in the North) or taw (in the South):

Gwyddost ti mai fi ydy'r gorau. – 'You know that it's me who's the best.'

Focused clauses can be made negative with nad, or made negative normally (with mai nid or mai dim):

Gwyddost ti nad fi ydy'r gorau. = Gwyddost ti mai nid fi ydy'r gorau. = Gwyddost ti mai dim fi ydy'r gorau. – 'You know that it's not me who's the best.'
