= Welsh morphology =

Welsh morphology is the study of the internal structure of the words of the Welsh language and their systematic relationship within the language. This includes the principles by which Welsh words and morphemes arise, their form and derivation. A fundamental aspect of this study is the analysis of its inflectional system, and how this encodes grammatical categories.

The historical development of the Welsh language has followed an atypical pattern resulting in two highly divergent registers: a literary form, and a colloquial form. These forms are both in modern use, with literary Welsh used in only the most formal or traditional artistic or religious contexts. The morphology of the two registers is so different that even native speakers of Welsh may need specific education in literary Welsh; this goes beyond that which is usually needed by native speakers of most other languages, when they encounter the most formal or rarefied register of their mother tongue.

The morphology of the two registers is discussed in separate articles:

- Colloquial Welsh morphology, the morphology and grammar of the modern spoken variety of Welsh which can be heard spoken in Welsh-speaking areas of Wales.
- Literary Welsh morphology, the morphology and grammar of the formal literary register which is closer (grammatically) to Middle Welsh, retains features lost from the colloquial register, and is used purely for literary purposes. Literary Welsh does not reflect any spoken dialect of Welsh of the past or present.

Details of the morphological system of Welsh are also covered in:

- Middle Welsh § Morphology
- Welsh language § Morphology
- Welsh mutation
- Gender neutrality in Welsh

== See also ==
- Welsh language § Registers
- Old Welsh, the language c. 800 AD – early 12th century
- Welsh substrate in English
