= Colloquial Welsh morphology =

The morphology of the Welsh language has many characteristics not found in English or in European languages such as French or German, but has much in common with the other modern Insular Celtic languages: Irish, Scottish Gaelic, Manx, and Cornish. Welsh is a moderately inflected language. Verbs inflect for person, number, tense, and mood, with affirmative, interrogative, and negative conjugations of some verbs. There is no case inflection in Modern Welsh, the last vestige of which may only be found in the soft mutation found in vocative use, itself sporadic and unreliable in the spoken language.

Modern Welsh can be written and spoken in several levels of formality, for example colloquial or literary, as well as different dialects. The grammar described in this article is for Colloquial Welsh, which is used for speech and informal writing. Literary Welsh is closer to the form of Welsh used in William Morgan's 1588 translation of the Bible and can be seen in formal writing. It does not reflect the spoken language presented here.

== Initial consonant mutation ==
Initial consonant mutation is a phenomenon common to all Insular Celtic languages, although there is no evidence of it in the ancient Continental Celtic languages of the first millennium AD; nor was there any evidence of this in the Insular Celtic languages around the 500s.

The first consonant of a word may change when preceded by certain words (e.g. prepositions, articles, determiners, and conjunctions), or because of some other grammatical context (such as when the grammatical object follows a conjugated verb). Mutations are also frequently used to indicate the gender of a mutable noun. As well as at the beginning of words, mutations are also regularly found at the beginning of the second element of compound words.

Welsh has three mutation grades: the soft mutation (Welsh: treiglad meddal), the nasal mutation (Welsh: treiglad trwynol), and the aspirate mutation (Welsh: treiglad llaes; also called spirant mutation in some grammars). There is a fourth mutation, the mixed mutation which combines the aspirate/spirant mutation with the soft mutation. These are also represented in the orthography:

Radical Gwreiddiol		Soft Meddal		Nasal Trwynol		Aspirate Llaes		English Saesneg
p /p/	plant /plant/	b /b/	blant /blant/	mh /m̥/	mhlant /m̥lant/	ph /f/	phlant /flant/	children
t /t/	tref /treː(v)/	d /d/	dref /dreː(v)/	nh /n̥/	nhref /n̥reː(v)/	th /θ/	thref /θreː(v)/	town
t /t/	tŷ /tiː/	d /d/	dŷ /diː/	nh /n̥/	nhŷ /n̥iː/	th /θ/	thŷ /θiː/	house
c /k/	coeden /kɔi̯dɛn/	g /ɡ/	goeden /ɡɔi̯dɛn/	ngh /ŋ̊/	nghoeden /ŋ̊ɔi̯dɛn/	ch /χ/	choeden /χɔi̯dɛn/	tree
b /b/	brawd /braʊ̯d/	f /v/	frawd /vraʊ̯d/	m /m/	mrawd /mraʊ̯d/			brother
d /d/	dŵr /duːr/	dd /ð/	ddŵr /ðuːr/	n /n/	nŵr /nuːr/			water
g /ɡ/	gwaith /ɡwai̯θ/	∅ (Note: Soft mutation causes initial /ɡ/ to be deleted. For example, gardd "garden" becomes yr ardd "the garden"; or gwaith "work" becomes ei waith "his work".)	waith /wai̯θ/	ng /ŋ/	ngwaith /ŋwai̯θ/			work
g /ɡ/	glas /ɡlas/	∅	las /las/	ng /ŋ/	nglas /ŋlas/			blue
g /ɡ/	gorsaf /ɡɔrsa(v)/	∅	orsaf /ɔrsa(v)/	ng /ŋ/	ngorsaf /ŋɔrsa(v)/			station
m /m/	mawr /maʊ̯r/	f /v/	fawr /vaʊ̯r/					big
ll /ɬ/	llan /ɬan/	l /l/	lan /lan/					parish
rh /r̥/	rhywbeth /r̥ɪʊ̯bɛθ/	r /r/	rywbeth /rɪʊ̯bɛθ/					something
ts /t͡ʃ/	tsips /t͡ʃɪps/	j /d͡ʒ/	jips /d͡ʒɪps/					chips

A blank cell indicates no change.

The mutation ts → j reflects a change heard in modern words borrowed from English. Borrowed words like tsips (chips) can often be heard in Wales and the mutated form jips is also common. Dw i'n mynd i gael tsips (I'm going to get chips); Mae gen i jips (I have chips). Despite this the "ts" → "j" mutation is not usually included in the classic list of Welsh mutations and is rarely taught in formal classes. Nevertheless, it is a part of the colloquial language and is used by native, first-language speakers. As well as soft mutation of ts it has also been reported that some speakers display the nasal mutation of ts → nh.

The word for "stone" is carreg, but "the stone" is y garreg (soft mutation), "my stone" is fy ngharreg (nasal mutation) and "her stone" is ei charreg (aspirate mutation). These examples represent usage in the standard language; there is some regional and idiolectal variation in colloquial usage. In particular, the soft mutation is often used where nasal or aspirate mutation might be expected on the basis of these examples.

Mutation is not triggered by the form of the preceding word; the meaning and grammatical function of the word are also relevant. For example, while yn meaning "in" triggers nasal mutation, homonyms of yn do not. For example:

- In the sentence Mae plastig yn nhrwyn Siaco ("There is plastic in Siaco's nose") trwyn has undergone nasal mutation.
- In the sentence Mae trwyn Siaco yn blastig ("Siaco's nose is plastic") plastig has undergone soft mutation, not nasal mutation.
- In the sentence Mae trwyn Siaco yn cynnwys plastig ("Siaco's nose contains plastic") cynnwys is not mutated.

=== Soft mutation ===
The soft mutation (Welsh: treiglad meddal) is by far the most common mutation in Welsh. When words undergo soft mutation, the general pattern is that unvoiced plosives become voiced plosives, and voiced plosives become fricatives or disappear; some fricatives also change, and the full list is shown in the above table.

In some cases a limited soft mutation takes place. This differs from the full soft mutation in that words beginning with rh- and ll- do not mutate.

Common situations where the limited soft mutation occurs include:

- Feminine singular nouns after the definite article (y / yr / 'r), e.g. y rhyfel 'the war', not *y ryfel; y llwyfan 'the stage', not *y lwyfan.
- Feminine nouns following the numeral un (one), e.g. un rhyfel 'one war', not *un ryfel; un llwyfan 'one windpipe', not *un lwyfan.
- Nouns or adjectives used predicatively or adverbially after yn.
- Adjectives following mor ("so"), rhy ("too") or pur ("fairly, very").

Common situations where the full soft mutation occurs are as follows – this list is by no means exhaustive:

- Qualifiers (adjectives, nouns, or verb-nouns) used to qualify feminine singular nouns, e.g. cath fawr 'a big cat' [< mawr]; hogan ganu 'a singing girl' [< canu].
- Words immediately following the prepositions am ("for"), ar ("on"), at ("to"), dan ("under"), dros ("over"), trwy ("through"), heb ("without"), hyd ("until"), gan ("by"), wrth ("by, near, beside, with"), i ("to"), o ("of, from")
- Nouns following the number two (dau / dwy)
- Nouns following adjectives (N.B. most adjectives follow the noun); i.e. hen ddyn 'old man' (from dyn 'man').
- Nouns after the possessive adjectives dy (informal/singular 'your') and ei ('his').
- An object of a conjugated verb.
- The second element in many compound words, i.e. Llanfair from llan ('parish') + Mair ('Mary').
- Verb-nouns following an indirect object, i.e. rhaid i mi fynd ('I must go').
- Inflected verbs in the interrogative and negative (also frequently, in the spoken language, the affirmative), though this should strictly be the "mixed mutation".

The occurrence of the soft mutation often obscures the origin of placenames to non-Welsh-speaking visitors. For example, Llanfair is the church of Mair (Mary), and Pontardawe is the bridge on the Tawe (pont ar + Tawe).

=== Nasal mutation ===
The nasal mutation (Welsh: treiglad trwynol) normally occurs:

- after fy – generally pronounced as if spelt y(n) – ("my"), e.g. gwely ("a bed"), fy ngwely ("my bed"), pronounced yngwely
- after the locative preposition yn ("in"), e.g. Tywyn ("Tywyn"), yn Nhywyn ("in Tywyn")
- after the negating prefix an- ("un-"), e.g. teg ("fair"), annheg ("unfair").

Notes

1. The preposition yn becomes ym if the following noun (mutated or not) begins with m, and becomes yng if the following noun begins with ng, e.g. Bangor ("Bangor"), ym Mangor ("in Bangor"); Caerdydd ("Cardiff"), yng Nghaerdydd ("in Cardiff").
2. In words beginning with an-, the n is dropped before the mutated consonant (except if the resultant mutation allows for a double n), e.g. an + personol → amhersonol (although it would be retained before a non-mutating consonant, e.g. an + sicr → ansicr).
3. In some dialects the soft mutation is often substituted after yn giving forms like yn Gaerdydd for "in Cardiff", or it is even lost altogether, especially with place names, giving yn Caerdydd. This would be considered incorrect in formal registers.

Under nasal mutation, voiced stop consonants become nasals, and unvoiced stops become voiceless nasals. A non-standard mutation also occurs in some parts of North Wales where nasal consonants are also unvoiced, e.g. fy mham ("my mother"; standard: fy mam). This may also occur (unlike the ordinary nasal mutation) after ei ("her"): e.g. ei nhain hi ("her grandmother", standard ei nain hi).

=== Aspirate mutation ===
The name aspirate mutation can be misleading as the affected consonants do not become aspirated, but become fricatives. This is represented by the addition of an h after the original initial consonant (c /k/, p /p/, t /t/ → ch /χ/, ph /f/, th /θ/), but the resultant forms are pronounced as single phonemes.

The aspirate mutation occurs:

- after the possessive ei when it means "her" – ei chi hi 'her dog' (< ci 'dog')
- after a ("and") – coffi a theisen 'coffee and cake' (< teisen 'cake')
- after â ("with", "by means of") – cwtogi â chyllell 'cut with a knife' (< cyllell 'knife')
- after gyda ("with") – teisen gyda choffi 'cake with coffee' (< coffi 'coffee')
- for nouns after the masculine numeral three (tri) – tri physgodyn 'three fish(es)' (< pysgodyn 'fish')
- after the number six (chwech, written before a noun as chwe) – chwe phlentyn 'six children' (< plentyn 'child')

Aspirate mutation is the least-used mutation in colloquial Welsh. The only word that it always follows in everyday language is ei ("her") and it is also found in set phrases, e.g. mwy na thebyg ("more than likely"). Its occurrence is unusual in the colloquial Southern phrase dyna pham ("that's why") as dyna causes the soft mutation, not aspirate mutation. Colloquially, the aspirate mutation is often replaced by the soft mutation, or ignored altogether – particularly mutation of t- and p-; one is likely to hear paid â phoeni, paid â poeni, and paid poeni for 'don't worry'.

=== Mixed mutation ===
A mixed mutation occurs when negating conjugated verbs. Initial consonants undergo aspirate mutation if subject to it, and soft mutation if not. For example, clywais i ("I heard") and dwedais i ("I said") are negated as chlywais i ddim ("I heard nothing") and ddwedais i ddim ("I said nothing"). In practice, soft mutation is often used even when aspirate mutation would be possible (e.g. glywais i ddim); this reflects the fact that aspirate mutation is in general infrequent in the colloquial language (see above).

=== h-Prothesis ===
Under some circumstances an h is added to the beginning of words that begin with vowels, a process commonly called "h-prothesis" and usually called pre-vocalic aspiration (PVA) by linguists. This occurs after the possessive pronouns ei ("her"), ein ("our") and eu ("their"), e.g. oedran ("age"), ei hoedran hi ("her age"). It also occurs with ugain ("twenty") after ar ("on") in the traditional vigesimal counting system, e.g. un ar hugain ("twenty-one", literally "one on twenty").

Although aspirate mutation also involves the addition of h in spelling, the environments for aspirate mutation and initial h addition do not overlap except for ei ("her").

== The article ==
=== Indefinite article ===
Welsh has no indefinite article. This means that indefiniteness is implied by the lack of definite article or determiner. The noun cath, therefore, means both 'cat' and 'a cat'.

English has no plural indefinite article proper, but often uses the word "some" in place of one: compare "I have an apple" and "I have some apples", where the word "some" is being used as an article because the English language calls for something in this position, compare "I have apples" and "I have some apples". In these types of English sentences, the word "some" is therefore left untranslated due to there being no concept of an indefinite article in Welsh: mae gen i afalau ('I have [some] apples').

=== Definite article ===
The definite article, which precedes the words it modifies and whose usage differs little from that of English, has the forms y, yr, and ’r. The rules governing their usage are:

- When the previous word ends in a vowel, regardless of the quality of the word following, 'r is used, e.g. mae'r gath tu allan ("the cat is outside"). This rule takes precedence over the other two.
- When the following word (usually a noun) begins with a vowel or h, yr is used, e.g. yr ardd ("the garden"), yr haul ("the sun"). "w" counts as a vowel in words such as yr wyneb ("the face"), yr wythnos ("the week"); similarly "i" in yr iaith ("the language"). (But sometimes y is heard before wyneb and iaith.)
- In all other places, y is used, e.g. y bachgen ("the boy"). "w" counts as a consonant in words such as y wlad ("the country"), y we ("the web").

The article triggers the soft mutation when it is used with feminine singular nouns, e.g. tywysoges "(a) princess" but y dywysoges ("the princess").

The definite article is used in Welsh where it would not be used in English in the following ways:

- To prevent a noun from being indefinite. In an English sentence like I'm going to school, the noun school has no article, but the listener is expected to know which school is being talked about. In Welsh this noun (ysgol) would take the definite article: dw i'n mynd i'r ysgol ('I'm going to school').
- With demonstratives like this and that, which in Welsh are phrases equivalent to English the... here (this) and the... there (that), e.g. y bore 'ma (this morning); y gadair 'na (that chair).
- In certain places where English uses an indefinite article. English phrases like one pound per kilogram / one pound a kilogram replace the indefinite article with the definite article, e.g. un bunt y cilogram.
- In genitive constructions. English can again get away with no article in these phrases, e.g. Town Hall, City Centre. In Welsh these call for use of the definite article, e.g. Neuadd y Dref (Town Hall, lit. "hall of the town"); Canol y Ddinas (City Centre, lit. "centre of the city").

== Nouns ==
As in most other Indo-European languages, all nouns belong to a certain grammatical gender; the genders in Welsh are masculine and feminine. A noun's gender usually conforms to its referent's natural gender when it has one (e.g. mam 'mother' is grammatically feminine), but otherwise there are no major patterns (except that, as in many languages, certain noun suffixes show a consistent gender, as sometimes do nouns referring to certain classes of thing, e.g. all months of the year in Welsh are masculine) and gender must simply be learnt.

Welsh has two systems of grammatical number. Singular/plural nouns correspond to the singular/plural number system of English, although noun plurals are unpredictable and formed in several ways, since the plural form cannot be discerned simply by its singular form. Most nouns form the plural with a suffix (the most common, by far, is -au), e.g. tad / tadau. Others form the plural through vowel change (a process known as affection in Celtic languages), e.g. bachgen / bechgyn 'boy / boys'. Still others form their plurals through some combination of the two, e.g. chwaer / chwiorydd 'sister / sisters'.

A few nouns also display a dual number, e.g. llaw 'hand', dwylo '(two) hands', though llaw also has the general plural llawau. The dual dwylo comes from combining llaw with the feminine numeral dwy 'two'; dwylo is only used to refer to the hands of a single person, else llawau is used, e.g. dy ddwylo 'your hands', eich dwylo 'your hands', fy nwylo 'my hands', ein dwylo 'our hands', but mae llawau gyda phobol 'people have hands'. Deufis is used for 'a period of two months' and deuddydd is 'a period of two days', these using dau rather than dwy.

Welsh also has a special "plural" for 'a period of three days', tridiau which is commonly used across Wales.

The other system of grammatical number is the collective/singulative. The nouns in this system form the singulative by adding the suffix -yn (for masculine nouns) or -en (for feminine nouns) to the collective noun. Most nouns which belong in this system are frequently found in groups, for example, plant "children" and plentyn "a child", or coed "trees" and coeden "a tree". In dictionaries, the collective form, being the root form, is given first.

== Adjectives ==
Adjectives normally follow the noun they qualify, while a few, such as hen, pob, annwyl, and holl ("old", "every", "dear", "whole") precede it. For the most part, adjectives are uninflected, though there are a few with distinct masculine/feminine or singular/plural forms. After feminine singular nouns, adjectives receive the soft mutation.

Adjective comparison in Welsh is fairly similar to the English system. Adjectives with one or two syllables receive the endings -ach "-er" and -a(f) "-est", which change final b, d, g into p, t, c by provection, e. g. teg "fair", tecach "fairer", teca(f) "fairest". Adjectives with two or more syllables use the words mwy "more" and mwya "most", e. g. teimladwy "sensitive", mwy teimladwy "more sensitive", mwya teimladwy "most sensitive". Adjectives with two syllables can go either way. There is an additional degree of comparison, the equative, meaning "as ... as ...", e. g. cymaint â choeden "as big as a tree", where cymaint is the equative form of mawr "big, great, much".

=== Possessive adjectives ===
The usual method of showing possession in Welsh is to place the nouns or noun phrases in apposition. The possessed noun is placed before the possessor of the noun. For example, llong Dewi 'Dewi's ship' or canol y dref 'town centre', literally 'centre the town'. For this reason those which English describes as possessive pronouns Welsh describes as possessive adjectives. These possessive adjectives are placed before the noun and the corresponding pronoun follows it, effectively "sandwiching" the noun between the possessive adjective and the pronoun: fy nghar i 'my car', literally 'my car me'. As can be seen from this example, singular possessive adjectives are triggers of consonant mutation.

These are the possessive adjectives:

Person	Singular			Plural		
Person	Form	Mutation	Translation	Form	Mutation	Translation
1st Person	fy, 'y(n)	Nasal	my	ein	h-prosthesis	our
2nd Person	dy	Soft	your (singular, familiar)	eich	none	your (plural, or polite singular)
3rd Person	ei	Soft	his, its	eu	h-prosthesis	their
3rd Person	ei	Aspirate, h-prosthesis	her, its	eu	h-prosthesis	their

The corresponding pronoun is often dropped in the spoken language, fy mara 'my bread', dy fara 'your bread', etc. Some speakers will even keep the pronoun and drop the adjective: bara fi 'my bread', bara chi, etc., though this is non-standard.

The possessive adjective fy is most often heard as 'yn or 'y followed by the mutated noun. For example, bara ('bread') would likely be heard as 'y mara ('my bread').

The demonstrative adjectives are yma "this"' and yna "that" (this usage derives from their original function as adverbs meaning "here" and "there" respectively). When used in this context they are almost always shortened to 'ma and 'na. They follow the noun they qualify, which also takes the article. For example, y llyfr "the book", y llyfr 'ma "this book", y llyfr 'na "that book"; literally the book here and the book there.

== Pronouns ==
=== Personal pronouns ===
The Welsh personal pronouns are:

		Singular	Plural
1st Person		mi, i, fi	ni
2nd Person		ti, di, chdi	chi
3rd Person	Masculine	e/fe, o/fo	nhw
3rd Person	Feminine	hi	nhw

The Welsh masculine-feminine gender distinction is reflected in the pronouns. There is, consequently, no word corresponding to English "it", and the choice of e/o (south and north Welsh respectively) or hi depends on the grammatical gender of the antecedent.

The English dummy or expletive "it" construction in phrases like "it's raining" or "it was cold last night" also exists in Welsh and other Indo-European languages like French, German, and Dutch, but not in Italian, Spanish, Portuguese, Indo-Aryan, or Slavic languages. Unlike other masculine-feminine languages, which often default to the masculine pronoun in the construction, Welsh uses the feminine singular hi, thus producing sentences like:

Mae hi'n bwrw glaw.
It's raining.

Roedd hi'n oer neithiwr.
It was cold last night.

However, colloquially the pronoun is often omitted when it would be translated as "it" in English, leaving:

Mae'n bwrw glaw.
It's raining.

Roedd'n oer neithiwr.
It was cold last night.

==== Notes on the forms ====
Third-person masculine singular forms o and fo are heard in parts of mid- and north Wales, while e and fe are heard in parts of mid-, west and south Wales.

The pronoun forms i, e, and o are used as subjects after a verb. In the inflected future of the verbs mynd, gwneud, dod, and cael, first-person singular constructions like do fi may be heard. I, e, and o are also used as objects with compound prepositions, for example o flaen o 'in front of him'. Fi, fe, and fo are used after conjunctions and non-inflected prepositions, and also as the object of an inflected verb:

Weloch chi fo dros y penwythnos?
Did you see him over the weekend?

Fe and fo exclusively are used as subjects with the inflected conditional:

Dylai fe brynu un newydd i ti.
He ought to buy you a new one.

Both i, e, and o and fi, fe, and fo are heard with inflected prepositions, as objects of verbal nouns, and also as following pronouns with their respective possessive adjectives:

Wyt ti wedi ei weld e/fe/o/fo heddiw?
Have you seen him today?

Alla i ddim dod o hyd i fy allweddi i/fi.
I can't find my keys.

The use of first-person singular mi is limited in the spoken language, appearing in i mi "to/for me" or as the subject with the verb ddaru, used in a preterite construction.

Ti is found most often as the second-person singular pronoun, however di is used as the subject of inflected future forms, as a reinforcement in the imperative, and as following pronoun to the possessive adjective dy ... "your ..."

==== Ti vs. chi ====
Chi, in addition to serving as the second-person plural pronoun, is also used as a singular in formal situations, as is in French and Russian. Conversely, ti can be said to be limited to the informal singular, such as when speaking with a family member, a friend, or a child. This usage corresponds closely to the practice in other European languages. An alternative form of ti, used almost exclusively in some north-western dialects, is chdi; as an independent pronoun it occurs especially frequently after a vowel sound at the end of the phrase (e.g. efo chdi, i chdi, wela i chdi, dyna chdi).

==== Reflexive pronouns ====
The reflexive pronouns are formed with the possessive adjective followed by hun "self". There is variation between North and South forms. The first person singular possessive pronoun fy is usually pronounced as if spelt y(n).

		Singular	Plural
North	1st Person	fy hun	ein hun
North	2nd Person	dy hun	eich hun
North	3rd Person	ei hun	eu hun
South	1st Person	fy hunan	ein hunain
South	2nd Person	dy hunan	eich hunain, eich hunan
South	3rd Person	ei hunan	eu hunain

There is no gender distinction in the third person singular.

==== Emphatic pronouns ====
Welsh has special emphatic forms of the personal pronouns.

The term "emphatic pronoun" is misleading since they do not always indicate emphasis. They are perhaps more correctly termed "conjunctive, connective or distinctive pronouns" since they are used to indicate a connection between or distinction from another nominal element. For example, "minnau" may on occasion be best translated 'I/me, for my part'; 'I/me, on the other hand', 'I/me, however', or even simply 'I/me'. Full contextual information is necessary to interpret their function in any given sentence.

		Singular	Plural
1st Person		minnau, innau, finnau	ninnau
2nd Person		tithau	chithau
3rd Person	Masculine	fyntau (yntau)	nhwythau
3rd Person	Feminine	hithau	nhwythau

The emphatic pronouns can be used with possessive adjectives in the same way as the simple pronouns are used (with the added function of distinction or connection).

=== Demonstrative pronouns ===
While the singular demonstrative pronouns this and that have separate forms for masculine and feminine, there is only a single plural form in each case (these, those). This is consistent with a general principle in Welsh that gender is not marked in the plural. The latter forms are also often used for intangible, figurative, or general ideas (though cf. also the use of "hi" discussed above).

	Masculine	Feminine	Intangible
this	hwn	hon	hyn
that	hwnnw, hwnna	honno, honna	hynny
these	y rhain		
those	y rheiny		

In certain expressions, hyn may represent "now" and hynny may represent "then".

== Verbs ==
In Colloquial Welsh, the majority of tenses and moods make use of an auxiliary verb, usually bod 'to be' or gwneud 'to do'. The conjugation of bod is dealt with in Irregular Verbs below.

There are five periphrastic tenses in Colloquial Welsh which make use of bod: present, imperfect, future, and (less often) pluperfect; these are used variously in the indicative, conditional and (rarely) subjunctive. The preterite, future, and conditional tenses have a number of periphrastic constructions, but Welsh also maintains inflected forms of these tenses, demonstrated here with talu 'pay' (pluperfect conjugation is rarely found beyond the verb "bod").

talu — 'to pay'
		Singular	Plural
Preterite	1st Person	talais	talon
Preterite	2nd Person	talaist	taloch
Preterite	3rd Person	talodd	talon
Future	1st Person	talaf	talwn
Future	2nd Person	teli	talwch
Future	3rd Person	talith	talan
Conditional	1st Person	talwn	talen
Conditional	2nd Person	talet	talech
Conditional	3rd Person	talai	talen

- Notes on the preterite:
  - First and second singular forms may in less formal registers be written as tales and talest, though there is no difference in pronunciation since there is a basic rule of pronunciation that unstressed final syllables alter the pronunciation of the /ai/ diphthong.
  - Word-final -f is rarely heard in Welsh. Thus verbal forms in -af will be pronounced as if they ended in /a/ and they may be written thus in lower registers.
  - In some parts of Wales -s- may be inserted between the stem and plural forms.
  - In some dialects, forms like talws are heard for talodd.
- Notes on the future:
  - di is used instead of ti, thus teli di, not *teli ti.
  - Forms like taliff may appear instead of talith in some southern parts of Wales.
  - The future was formerly also used as an inflected present. A small amount of frozen forms use the future forms as a present habitual: mi godaf i am ddeg o'r gloch bob bore - I get up at ten o' clock every morning
- Notes on the conditional:
  - -s- or, -as, may be inserted between the stem and endings in the preterite and conditional (thus overlapping with the pluperfect in the latter case).

Questions are formed by effecting soft mutation on the verb (the effect of the interrogative particle "a", often elided in speech and informal writing), though increasingly the soft mutation is being used in all situations. Negative forms are expressed with ddim after the pronoun and the mixed mutation, though here the soft mutation is taking over in informal registers (dales i ddim for thales i ddim).

=== Irregular verbs ===
==== Bod and compounds ====
Bod 'to be' is irregular. In addition to having inflected forms of the preterite, future, and conditional, it also maintains inflected present and imperfect forms which are used frequently as auxiliaries with other verbs. Bod has separate conjugations for (a) affirmative and (b) interrogative and negative forms of the present indicative (there are also further variations in the third person singular, in the context of dependent clauses). The apparent high irregularity of this tense can be simplified and rationalised by tracing back the divergences to the standard formal written forms: e.g. "dyw e ddim" and "dydy e ddim" or "dydi o ddim" (he is not) can all be seen as informal variants of "nid ydyw ef (ddim)".

The present tense in particular shows divergence between north and southern dialects. Though the situation is undoubtedly more complicated, King (2003) notes the following variations in the present tense as spoken (not as written according to the standard orthography):

		Affirmative (I am)		Interrogative (Am I?)		Negative (I am not)	
		Singular	Plural	Singular	Plural	Singular	Plural
North	1st Person	dw	dan	ydw?	ydan?	(dy)dw	(dy)dan
North	2nd Person	—, (r)wyt	dach	wyt?	(y)dach?	dwyt	(dy)dach
North	3rd Person	mae	maen	ydy?	ydyn?	dydy	dydyn
South	1st Person	rw, w	ŷn, —	ydw?	ŷn?	(d)w	ŷn
South	2nd Person	—, (r)wyt	ych	wyt?	ych?	—	(ych)
South	3rd Person	mae	maen	ydy?, yw?	ŷn?	dyw	ŷn

		Affirmative (I am)		Interrogative (Am I?)		Negative (I am not)	
		Singular	Plural	Singular	Plural	Singular	Plural
Preterite	1st Person	bues	buon	fues?	fuon?	fues	fuon
Preterite	2nd Person	buest	buoch	fuest?	fuoch?	fuest	fuoch
Preterite	3rd Person	buodd	buon	fuodd?	fuon?	fuodd	fuon
Imperfect	1st Person	roeddwn	roedden	oeddwn?	oedden?	doeddwn	doedden
Imperfect	2nd Person	roeddet	roeddech	oeddet?	oeddech?	doeddet	doeddech
Imperfect	3rd Person	roedd	roeddyn	oedd?	oeddyn?	doedd	doeddyn
Future	1st Person	bydda	byddwn	fydda?	fyddwn?	fydda	fyddwn
Future	2nd Person	byddi	byddwch	fyddi?	fyddwch?	fyddi	fyddwch
Future	3rd Person	bydd	byddan	fydd?	fyddan?	fydd	fyddan

Bod also has a conditional, for which there are two stems:

		Affirmative		Interrogative		Negative	
		Singular	Plural	Singular	Plural	Singular	Plural
bydd-	1st Person	byddwn	bydden	fyddwn?	fydden?	fyddwn	fydden
bydd-	2nd Person	byddet	byddech	fyddet?	fyddech?	fyddet	fyddech
bydd-	3rd Person	byddai	bydden	fyddai?	fydden?	fyddai	fydden
bas-	1st Person	baswn	basen	faswn?	fasen?	faswn	fasen
bas-	2nd Person	baset	basech	faset?	fasech?	faset	fasech
bas-	3rd Person	basai	basen	fasai?	fasen?	fasai	fasen

- ddim ("not") is added after the subject for negative forms of bod.
- There are many dialectal variations of this verb.
- Colloquially the imperfect tense forms are o'n i, o't ti, oedd e/hi, o'n ni, o'ch chi and o'n nhw. These are used for the declarative, interrogative and negative.
- In speech the future and conditional forms often receive the soft mutation in all situations.
- Welsh and other Celtic languages are unusual among the European languages in having no fixed words for "yes" and "no" (although many speakers do use "ie" and "na" in ways that mimic English usage). If a question has a verb at its head, the relevant part of that verb is used in the answer, e.g. Ydych chi'n hoffi coffi? (Are you liking coffee? = Do you like coffee?) then either Ydw (I am = I do = Yes) or Nac ydw (I am not = I do not = No)

A few verbs which have bod in the verbnoun display certain irregular characteristics of bod itself. Gwybod is the most irregular of these. It has preterite and conditional forms, which are often used with present and imperfect meaning, respectively. The present is conjugated irregularly:

	Singular	Plural
1st Person	gwn	gwyddon
2nd Person	gwyddost	gwyddoch
3rd Person	gŵyr	gwyddon

The common phrase dwn i ddim "I don't know" uses a special negative form of the first person present. The initial d- in this form originates in the negative particle nid: nid wn i > nid wn i ddim > dwn i ddim. Such a development is restricted to a very small set of verb forms, principally this form of gwybod and various forms of bod (e.g. does, doedd, from nid oes and nid oedd respectively)."

==== Mynd, gwneud, cael, and dod ====
The four verb-nouns mynd "to go", gwneud "to do", cael "to get", and dod "to come" are all irregular in similar ways.

		mynd		gwneud		cael		dod	
		Singular	Plural	Singular	Plural	Singular	Plural	Singular	Plural
Preterite	1st Person	es	aethon	wnes	wnaethon	ces	caethon	des	daethon
Preterite	2nd Person	est	aethoch	wnest	wnaethoch	cest	caethoch	dest	daethoch
Preterite	3rd Person	aeth	aethon	wnaeth	wnaethon	caeth	caethon	daeth	daethon
Future	1st Person	a	awn	na	nawn	ca	cawn	do	down
Future	2nd Person	ei	ewch	nei	newch	cei	cewch	doi	dewch
Future	3rd Person	eith	ân	neith	nân	ceith	cân	daw	dôn

The forms caeth, caethon, caethoch often appear as cafodd, cawson, cawsoch in writing, and in places in Wales these are also heard in speech.

In the conditional, there is considerable variation between the North and South forms of these four irregular verbs. That is partly because the North form corresponds to the Middle Welsh (and Literary Welsh) imperfect indicative, while the South form corresponds to the Middle Welsh (and Literary Welsh) imperfect subjunctive.

		mynd		gwneud		cael		dod	
		Singular	Plural	Singular	Plural	Singular	Plural	Singular	Plural
North	1st Person	awn	aen	nawn	naen	cawn	caen	down	doen
North	2nd Person	aet	aech	naet	naech	caet	caech	doet	doech
North	3rd Person	âi	aen	nâi	naen	câi	caen	dôi	doen
South	1st Person	elwn	elen	nelwn	nelen	celwn	celen	delwn	delen
South	2nd Person	elet	elech	nelet	nelech	celet	celech	delet	delech
South	3rd Person	elai	elen	nelai	nelen	celai	celen	delai	delen

== Prepositions ==
Prepositions are words like on, at, to, from, by and for in English. They often describe a relationship, spatial or temporal, between persons and objects. For example, "the book is on the table"; "the table is by the window".

There are approximately two-dozen or so simple prepositions in modern colloquial Welsh. While some have clear-cut and obvious translations (heb 'without'), others correspond to different English prepositions depending on context (i, wrth, am). As with all areas of modern Welsh, some words are preferred in the North and others in the South.

The main prepositions used in modern colloquial Welsh are:

- â
- am
- ar
- at
- cyn
- [o] dan (tan)
- dros (tros)
- efo (hefo)
- gan
- ger
- gyda
- heb
- hyd
- i
- mewn
- o
- oddiar (oddi ar)
- oddiwrth (oddi wrth)
- rhag
- rhwng
- tan
- trwy (drwy)
- tua
- wrth
- yn

Most of these (but not all) share the following characteristics:

1. they cause mutation of the following word
2. they inflect for person and number, similar to verbs
3. they can be used with a following verbal noun

Inflected prepositions

When used with a personal pronoun, most prepositions insert a linking syllable before the pronoun. This syllable changes for each preposition and results in an inflection pattern similar to that found in Welsh verbs. Broadly speaking, the endings for inflected prepositions are as follows:

		Singular	Plural
1st Person		-a i	-on ni
2nd Person		-at ti	-och chi
3rd Person	Masculine	-o fe/fo	-yn nhw
3rd Person	Feminine	-i hi	-yn nhw
