= Verbnoun =

In Celtic languages such as Welsh, a verbnoun (or verb-noun) is the basic form of a verb and is the form usually listed in a dictionary (for example, in the 'Modern Welsh Dictionary').

In Welsh, for example, it is frequently used in conjunction with an auxiliary verb to form a periphrastic verb. It is similar in meaning to an English '-ing participle' or gerund, although it is often translated as a 'to-infinitive'.

See the article on verbal nouns for the term more generally used in grammatical descriptions. It is the verb form which functions as a noun, naming an "action or state without reference to who does it or when".

It is often formed by the addition of a suffix to a verb stem, though its form is sometimes the same as that of the verb stem. For example, in the Manx language, "etl" is the verb stem (and imperative singular, as is usually the case in Celtic languages) corresponding to the English verb "fly". The verbnoun is formed by the addition of the suffix "-agh" to this stem, giving "etlagh".

== See also ==
- Gerund
- Infinitive
- Participle
- Verbal noun
