= Literary Welsh morphology =

The morphology of the Welsh language shows many characteristics perhaps unfamiliar to speakers of English or continental European languages like French or German, but has much in common with the other modern Insular Celtic languages: Irish, Scottish Gaelic, Manx, Cornish, and Breton. Welsh is a moderately inflected language. Verbs conjugate for person, tense and mood with affirmative, interrogative and negative conjugations of some verbs. A majority of prepositions inflect for person and number. There are few case inflections in Literary Welsh, being confined to certain pronouns.

Modern Welsh can be written in two varieties – Colloquial Welsh or Literary Welsh. The grammar described on this article is for Literary Welsh.

== Initial consonant mutation ==
Initial consonant mutation is a phenomenon common to all Insular Celtic languages (there is no evidence of it in the ancient Continental Celtic languages of the early first millennium). The first consonant of a word in Welsh may change depending on grammatical context (such as when the grammatical object directly follows the grammatical subject), when preceded by certain words, e.g. i, yn, and a or when the normal word order of a sentence is changed, e.g. Y mae tŷ gennyf, Y mae gennyf dŷ "I have a house".

Welsh has three mutations across four paradigms: the soft mutation (Welsh: treiglad meddal), the nasal mutation (Welsh: treiglad trwynol), and the aspirate (or spirant) mutation (Welsh: treiglad llaes); and the mixed mutation (Welsh: treiglad cymysg) where the aspirate mutation is applied where possible, else the soft mutation is applied. These are represented in writing, as shown in the table below along with their corresponding IPA symbols.

Radical Gwreiddiol	Soft Meddal	Nasal Trwynol	Aspirate Llaes	Mixed Cymysg
p /p/	b /b/	mh /m̥/	ph /f/	ph /f/
t /t/	d /d/	nh /n̥/	th /θ/	th /θ/
c /k/	g /ɡ/	ngh /ŋ̊/	ch /χ/	ch /χ/
b /b/	f /v/	m /m/		f /v/
d /d/	dd /ð/	n /n/		dd /ð/
g /ɡ/	∅*	ng /ŋ/		∅*
m /m/	f /v/			f /v/
ll /ɬ/	l /l/			l /l/
rh /r̥/	r /r/			r /r/

A blank cell indicates no change.

For example, the word for "stone" is carreg, but "the stone" is y garreg (soft mutation), "my stone" is fy ngharreg (nasal mutation) and "her stone" is ei charreg (aspirate mutation).

* The soft mutation for g is the simple deletion of the initial sound. For example, gardd "garden" becomes yr ardd "the garden". But this can behave as a consonant under certain circumstances, e.g. "gellir" (one can) becomes "ni ellir" (one cannot) not "*nid ellir". This however also stands alongside gardd ('a garden'), but yr ardd ('the garden') not *y ardd.

=== Soft mutation ===
The soft mutation (Welsh: treiglad meddal) is, by far, the most common mutation in Welsh. When words undergo soft mutation, the general pattern is that voiceless plosives become voiced plosives, voiced plosives become voiced fricatives, and voiceless liquids becomes voiced. The full list is shown in the above table.

Common situations where the full soft mutation occurs are as follows – this list is by no means exhaustive:

- adjectives (and nouns used adjectivally) qualifying feminine singular nouns
- words immediately following the prepositions am "for, about", ar "on", at "to", tan/dan "under", tros/dros "over", trwy/drwy "through", heb "without", hyd "until", gan "by", wrth "at", i "to, for", o "of, from"
- nouns used with the number two (dau / dwy)
- nouns following adjectives (N.B. most adjectives follow the noun)
- nouns after the possessives dy, informal singular "your", and ei when it means "his"
- an object of an inflected verb, except if it has the article
- the second element in many compound words
- the first letter of adverbs and adverbial phrases, especially of time (e.g. bob dydd "every day" cf. pob "every"; N.B. pob itself does not cause mutation)
- the second element in many adverbial phrases, e.g. hollol wahanol "completely different"
- when an adverbial phrase comes between two elements, the second element is mutated (e.g. rhaid mynd "it is necessary to go" becomes rhaid i mi fynd "it is necessary to me to go")
- verbs after the interrogative particle a (e.g. cerddaist "you walked", a gerddaist? "did you walk?")

In some cases a limited soft mutation takes place. This differs from the full soft mutation in that words beginning with rh and ll do not mutate. Situations where the limited soft mutation occurs are as follows:

- feminine singular nouns with the definite article y, 'r or the number one (un)
- nouns or adjectives used predicatively or adverbially after yn (N.B. a verb-noun such as mynd "going" does not change after yn)
- adjectives following cyn or mor, both meaning "so"
- sometimes after prefixes ending in -n or -r such as can- and dar-

The occurrence of the soft mutation often obscures the origin of placenames to non-Welsh-speaking visitors. For example, Llanfair is the church of Mair (Mary, mother of Jesus), and Pontardawe is the bridge on the Tawe.

=== Nasal mutation ===
The nasal mutation (Welsh: treiglad trwynol) normally occurs:

- after fy "my" e.g. gwely "a bed", fy ngwely "my bed"
- after the locative preposition yn "in" e.g. Tywyn "Tywyn", yn Nhywyn "in Tywyn"
- after the negating prefix an-, e.g. teg "fair", annheg "unfair".

==== Notes ====
1. In the spoken language the possessive adjective fy "my" is most often heard as if spelt y / yn (i.e. /ə ən/) or, in the presence of the nasal mutation, omitted all together - e.g. nhad "my father" (fy omitted), 'yn afal "my apple", 'y chwaer "my sister". In the literary language, however, it is always given as fy: fy nhad, fy afal, fy chwaer.
2. The preposition yn becomes ym if the following noun (mutated or not) begins with m, and yng if the following noun begins with ng, e.g. Bangor "Bangor", ym Mangor "in Bangor", Caerdydd "Cardiff", yng Nghaerdydd "in Cardiff".
3. In words beginning with an-, the n is dropped before the mutated consonant, e.g. an + personol "personal" → amhersonol "impersonal", although it is retained before a non-mutating letter, e.g. an + sicr "certain" → ansicr "uncertain", or if the resultant mutation allows for a double n, e.g. an + datod "undo" → annatod "integral". (This final rule does not apply to words that would potentially produce a cluster of four consonants, e.g. an + trefn "order" → anhrefn "disorder", not *annhrefn.)

Under nasal mutation, voiced stop consonants become voiced nasals, and plain stops become voiceless nasals.

==== Grammatical considerations ====
Yn meaning "in" must be distinguished from other uses of yn which do not cause nasal mutation. For example:

- Mae e ym Mangor "he's in Bangor": Bangor has undergone nasal mutation.
- Mae e'n barod "he's ready": parod has undergone soft, not nasal, mutation.
- Mae e'n canu "he's singing": a verb-noun such as canu is not mutated.

In the second and third examples, yn is reduced to 'n after a vowel.

The ’m form often used instead of fy after vowels does not cause nasal mutation. For example:

- Pleidiol wyf i'm gwlad. (not *i'm ngwlad)

=== Aspirate mutation ===
The aspirate mutation (Welsh: traiglad llaes) turns the voiceless plosives into voiceless fricatives. In writing, the aspirate mutation is shown by an addition of an h in the spelling (c, p, t → ch, ph, th), the resultant forms are single phonemes: (/k p t/ → /χ f θ/).

The aspirate mutation occurs:

- after the possessive adjective ei when it means "her"
- after a "and"
- after â "with, by means of"
- after the preposition gyda "with"
- for masculine nouns after the number three (tri)
- after the number six (chwe)

Notes

1. The aspirate mutation resulting from ei "her" distinguishes it from ei "his" (which causes soft mutation) - e.g. ei thad hi "her father" (as opposed to ei dad ef "his father").
2. a "and" and â "with, by means of" become ac and ag before vowels, respectively - e.g. ac afal "and an apple"; paid ag aros "don't wait".
3. gyda "with" becomes gydag before a vowel and is also seen shortened to 'da / 'dag. In the spoken language, gyda(g) is restricted to Southern dialects (with the exception of a few set phrases) and is often replaced by efo or gan in the North depending on usage; the literary language, however, prefers the use of gyda(g).
4. Feminine nouns are preceded by the numeral tair, not tri; tair does not cause mutation - e.g. tair cath "three cats", but tri chi "three dogs".
5. The Welsh numeral chwech becomes chwe before a noun. This is similar to the numeral pump which is always pum before a noun - e.g. chwe gwlad "six nations", chwe threiglad "six mutations", chwech o blant "six children".

=== Mixed mutation ===
A mixed mutation occurs after the particles ni (before a vowel nid), na (before a vowel nad) and oni (before a vowel onid) which negate verbs. Initial consonants which can take the aspirate mutation do so; other consonants take the soft mutation if possible - all other consonants do not mutate. For example, clywais "I heard" is negated as ni chlywais "I did not hear", na chlywais "that I did not hear" and oni chlywais? "did I not hear?", whereas dywedais "I said" is negated as ni ddywedais, na ddywedais and oni ddywedais?.

In the modern spoken language, the aspirate mutation is declining and is (outside of set phrases) often omitted or replaced by the soft mutation. However, in the formal literary language (here presented) all mutations are preserved and used as expected without regional or dialectal intrusion.

=== Phonetic values of mutated phonemes ===
The true phonetic values of some of the Welsh phonemes, particularly /ŋ̊ n̥ m̥/ are often debated in academia. It is often claimed that the voiceless nasals are actually aspirated [/ŋ̊ʰ n̥ʰ m̥ʰ]. The value of Welsh ⟨ch⟩ is also often debated as to whether it has the underlying value /χ/ or /x/; regardless of its underlying value, it is often heard as [x] in the South and [χ] in the North.

== The article ==
Welsh has no indefinite article. The definite article, which precedes the words it modifies and whose usage differs little from that of English, has the forms y, yr, and ’r. The rules governing their usage are:

1. When the previous word ends in a vowel, regardless of the quality of the word following, ’r is used, e.g. mae'r gath tu allan ("the cat is outside"). This rule takes precedence over the other two below.
2. When the word begins with a vowel or /h/, yr is used, e.g. yr arth "the bear", yr haf /ər ˈhaːv/ "the summer"..
3. In all other places, y is used, e.g. y bachgen ("the boy").

The letter w represents both a consonant /w/ and the vowels /u/ and /ʊ/ - a preceding definite article will reflect this by following the rules above, e.g. y wal /ə ˈwal/ "the wall" but yr wy /ər ˈʊˑɨ/ or /ər ˈʊi/ "the egg". The article yr is also used with nouns such as wyneb in which w was formerly /ʊ/ but is now often pronounced /w/: yr wyneb "the face or surface".

Pre-vocalic yr is used before both the consonantal and vocalic values represented by i, e.g. yr iâr /ər ˈjaːr/ "the hen" and yr ing /ər ˈiŋ/ "the anguish".

The first rule may be applied with greater or less frequency in various literary contexts. For example, poetry might use ’r more often to help with metre, e.g. ’R un nerth sydd yn fy Nuw "The same power is in my God" from a hymn by William Williams Pantycelyn. On the other hand, sometimes its use is more restricted in very formal contexts, e.g. Wele, dyma y rhai annuwiol "Behold, these are the ungodly" in Psalm 73.12.

The article triggers the soft mutation when it is used with feminine singular nouns, e.g. tywysoges "(a) princess" becomes y dywysoges "the princess", but no mutation in the plural: y tywysogesau "the princesses".

== Nouns ==
Like most Indo-European languages, all nouns belong to a certain grammatical gender; in this case, masculine or feminine. A noun's gender conforms to its referent's natural gender when it has one, e.g. mam "mother" is feminine. There are also semantic, morphological and phonological clues to help determine a noun's gender, e.g. llaeth "milk" is masculine as are all liquids, priodas "wedding" is feminine because it ends in the suffix -as, and theatr "theatre" is feminine because the stressed vowel is an e. Many everyday nouns, however, possess no such clues.

Sometimes a noun's gender may vary depending on meaning, for example gwaith when masculine means "work", but when feminine, it means "occasion, time". The words for languages behave like feminine nouns (i.e. mutate) after the article, e.g. y Gymraeg "the Welsh language", but as masculine nouns (i.e. without mutation of an adjective) when qualified, e.g. Cymraeg da "good Welsh". The gender of some nouns depends on a user's dialect, and although in the literary language there is some standardization, some genders remain unstable, e.g. tudalen "page".

Welsh has two systems of grammatical number. Singular/plural nouns correspond to the singular/plural number system of English, although unlike English, Welsh noun plurals are unpredictable and formed in several ways. Some nouns form the plural with an ending (usually -au), e.g. tad and tadau. Others form the plural through vowel change, e.g. bachgen and bechgyn. Still others form their plurals through some combination of the two, e.g. chwaer and chwiorydd.

Several nouns have two plural forms, e.g. the plural of stori "story" is either storïau or straeon. This can help distinguish meaning in some cases, e.g. whereas llwyth means both "tribe" and "load", llwythau means "tribes" and llwythi means "loads".

The other system of grammatical number is the collective/singulative. The nouns in this system form the singulative by adding the suffix -yn (for masculine nouns) or -en (for feminine nouns) to the collective noun. Most nouns which belong in this system are frequently found in groups, for example, plant "children" and plentyn "a child", or coed "trees, forest" and coeden "a tree", ffawydd "a beechwood, beech trees, beeches" and ffawydden "a beech tree". In dictionaries, the collective form, being the root form, is given first.

== Adjectives ==
Adjectives normally follow the noun they qualify, e.g. mab ieuanc "(a) young son", while a small number precede it, usually causing soft mutation, e.g. hen fab "(an) old son". The position of an adjective may even determine its meaning, e.g. mab unig "(a) lonely son" as opposed to unig fab "(an) only son". In poetry, however, and to a lesser extent in prose, most adjectives may occur before the noun they modify, but this is a literary device. It is also seen in some place names, such as Harlech (hardd + llech) and Glaslyn.

When modifying a noun (i.e. in an attributive construction) belonging to the feminine, adjectives undergo soft mutation, for example, bach "small" and following the masculine noun bwrdd and the feminine noun bord, both meaning "table":

	Masculine	Feminine
Singular	bwrdd bach	bord fach
Plural	byrddau bach	bordydd bach

For the most part, adjectives are uninflected, though there are a few with distinct masculine/feminine and/or singular/plural forms. A feminine adjective is formed from a masculine by means of vowel change, usually "w" to "o" (e.g. crwn "round" to cron) or "y" to "e" (e.g. gwyn "white" to gwen). A plural adjective may employ vowel change (e.g. marw "dead" to meirw), take a plural ending (e.g. coch "red" to cochion) or both (e.g. glas "blue, green" to gleision).

	Masculine	Feminine
Singular	bwrdd brwnt	bord front
Plural	byrddau bryntion	bordydd bryntion

Adjective comparison in Welsh is fairly similar to the English system except that there is an additional degree, the equative (Welsh y radd gyfartal). Native adjectives with one or two syllables usually receive the endings -ed "as/so" (preceded by the word cyn in a sentence, which causes a soft mutation except with ll and rh: cyn/mor daled â chawr, "as tall as a giant"), -ach "-er" and -af "-est". The stem of the adjective may also be modified when inflected, including by provection, where final or near-final b, d, g become p, t, c respectively.

Positive	Equative	Comparative	Superlative	English
tal	taled	talach	talaf	"tall"
gwan	gwanned	gwannach	gwannaf	"weak"
trwm	trymed	trymach	trymaf	"heavy"
gwlyb	gwlyped	gwlypach	gwlypaf	"wet"
rhad	rhated	rhatach	rhataf	"cheap"
teg	teced	tecach	tecaf	"fair"

Generally, adjectives with two or more syllables use a different system, whereby the adjective is preceded by the words mor "as/so" (which causes a soft mutation except with ll and rh), mwy "more" and mwyaf "most".

Positive	Equative	Comparative	Superlative	English
diddorol	mor ddiddorol	mwy diddorol	mwyaf diddorol	"interesting"
cynaliadwy	mor gynaliadwy	mwy cynaliadwy	mwyaf cynaliadwy	"sustainable"
llenyddol	mor llenyddol	mwy llenyddol	mwyaf llenyddol	"literary"

The literary language tends to prefer the use inflected adjectives where possible.

There are also a number of irregular adjectives.

Positive	Equative	Comparative	Superlative	English
da	cystal	gwell	gorau	"good"
drwg	cynddrwg	gwaeth	gwaethaf	"bad"
mawr	cymaint	mwy	mwyaf	"big"
bach	cyn lleied	llai	lleiaf	"small"
hir	hwyed	hwy	hwyaf	"long"
cyflym	cynted	cynt	cyntaf	"fast"

These are the possessive adjectives:

		Singular	Plural
1st Person		fy (n)	ein
2nd Person		dy (s)	eich
3rd Person	Masculine	ei (s)	eu
3rd Person	Feminine	ei (a)	eu

The possessive adjectives precede the noun they qualify, which is sometimes followed by the corresponding form of the personal pronoun, especially to emphasize the possessor, e.g. fy mara i "my bread", dy fara di "your bread", ei fara ef "his bread" etc.

Ein, eu and feminine ei add an h a following word beginning with a vowel, e.g. enw "name", ei henw "her name".

The demonstrative adjectives are inflected for gender and number:

	Masculine	Feminine	Plural
Proximal	hwn	hon	hyn
Distal	hwnnw	honno	hynny

These follow the noun they qualify, which also takes the article. For example, the masculine word llyfr "book" becomes y llyfr hwn "this book", y llyfr hwnnw "that book", y llyfrau hyn "these books" and y llyfrau hynny "those books".

== Pronouns ==
=== Personal pronouns ===
The Welsh personal pronouns are:

		Singular	Plural
1st Person		fi, mi, i	ni
2nd Person		ti, di	chwi, chi
3rd Person	Masculine	e(f)	hwy, hwynt
3rd Person	Feminine	hi	hwy, hwynt

The Welsh masculine-feminine gender distinction is reflected in the pronouns. There is, consequently, no word corresponding to English "it", and the choice of e or hi depends on the grammatical gender of the antecedent.

The English dummy or expletive "it" construction in phrases like "it's raining" or "it was cold last night" also exists in Welsh and other Indo-European languages like French, German, and Dutch, but not in Italian, Spanish, Portuguese, or the Slavic languages. Unlike other masculine-feminine languages, which often default to the masculine pronoun in the construction, Welsh uses the feminine singular hi, thus producing sentences like:

Mae hi'n bwrw glaw.
It's raining.

Yr oedd hi'n oer neithiwr.
It was cold last night.

==== Notes on the forms ====
The usual third-person masculine singular form is ef in Literary Welsh. The form fe is used as an optional affirmative marker before a conjugated verb at the start of a clause, but may also be found elsewhere in modern writing, influenced by spoken Welsh.

The traditional third-person plural form is hwy, which may optionally be expanded to hwynt where the previous word does not end in -nt itself. Once more, modern authors may prefer to use the spoken form nhw, although this cannot be done after literary forms of verbs and conjugated prepositions.

Similarly, there is some tendency to follow speech and drop the "w" from the second-person plural pronoun chwi in certain modern semi-literary styles.

In any case, pronouns are often dropped in the literary language, as the person and number can frequently be discerned from the verb or preposition alone.

==== Ti vs. chi ====
Chi, in addition to serving as the second-person plural pronoun, is also used as a singular in formal situations. Conversely, ti can be said to be limited to the informal singular, such as when speaking with a family member, a friend, or a child. This usage corresponds closely to the practice in other European languages. The third colloquial form, chdi, is not found in literary Welsh.

==== Reflexive pronouns ====
The reflexive pronouns are formed with the possessive adjective followed by hunan (plural hunain) "self".

	Singular	Plural
1st Person	fy hunan	ein hunain
2nd Person	dy hunan	eich hunain, eich hunan
3rd Person	ei hunan	eu hunain

There is no gender distinction in the third person singular.

==== Reduplicated pronouns ====
Literary Welsh has reduplicated pronouns that are used for emphasis, usually as the subject of a focussed sentence. For example:

Tydi a'n creodd ni. "(It was) You that created us."

Oni ddewisais i chwychwi? "Did I not choose you?"

		Singular	Plural
1st Person		myfi	nyni
2nd Person		tydi	chwychwi
3rd Person	Masculine	efe	hwynt-hwy
3rd Person	Feminine	hyhi	hwynt-hwy

==== Conjunctive pronouns ====
Welsh has special conjunctive forms of the personal pronouns. They are perhaps more descriptively termed 'connective or distinctive pronouns' since they are used to indicate a connection between or distinction from another nominal element. Full contextual information is necessary to interpret their function in any given sentence.

Less formal variants are given in brackets. Mutation may also, naturally, affect the forms of these pronouns (e.g. minnau may be mutated to finnau)

		Singular	Plural
1st Person		minnau, innau	ninnau
2nd Person		tithau	chwithau
3rd Person	Masculine	yntau (fyntau)	hwythau (nhwythau)
3rd Person	Feminine	hithau	hwythau (nhwythau)

The emphatic pronouns can be used with possessive adjectives in the same way as the simple pronouns are used (with the added function of distinction or connection).

=== Demonstrative pronouns ===
In addition to having masculine and feminine forms of this and that, Welsh also has separate set of this and that for intangible, figurative, or general ideas.

	Masculine	Feminine	Intangible
this	hwn	hon	hyn
that	hwnnw, hwnna	honno, honna	hynny
these	y rhain		
those	y rheiny		

In certain expressions, hyn may represent "now" and hynny may represent "then".

== Verbs ==
In literary Welsh, far less use is made of auxiliary verbs than in its colloquial counterpart. Instead conjugated forms of verbs are common. Most distinctively, the non-past tense is used for the present as well as the future.

The preterite, non-past (present-future), and imperfect (conditional) tenses have forms that are somewhat similar to colloquial Welsh, demonstrated here with talu 'pay'. There is a regular affection of the a to e before the endings -ais, -aist, -i, -ir and -id.

		Singular	Plural
Preterite	1st Person	telais	talasom
Preterite	2nd Person	telaist	talasoch
Preterite	3rd Person	talodd	talasant
Preterite	Impersonal	talwyd	
Non-Past	1st Person	talaf	talwn
Non-Past	2nd Person	teli	telwch
Non-Past	3rd Person	tâl	talant
Non-Past	Impersonal	telir	
Imperfect	1st Person	talwn	talem
Imperfect	2nd Person	talit	talech
Imperfect	3rd Person	talai	talent
Imperfect	Impersonal	telid	

To these, the literary language adds pluperfect, subjunctive, and imperative forms with affection before -wyf and -wch.

		Singular	Plural
Pluperfect	1st Person	talaswn	talasem
Pluperfect	2nd Person	talasit	talasech
Pluperfect	3rd Person	talasai	talasent
Pluperfect	Impersonal	talasid	
Subjunctive	1st Person	talwyf	talom
Subjunctive	2nd Person	telych	taloch
Subjunctive	3rd Person	talo	talont
Subjunctive	Impersonal	taler	
Imperative	1st Person	(does not exist)	talwn
Imperative	2nd Person	tala	telwch
Imperative	3rd Person	taled	talent
Imperative	Impersonal	taler	

=== Irregular verbs ===
==== Bod and compounds ====
Bod ("to be") is highly irregular. Compared with the inflected tenses above, it has separate present and future tenses, separate present and imperfect subjunctive tenses, separate imperfect and conditional tenses, and uses the pluperfect as a consuetudinal imperfect (amherffaith arferiadol) tense. The third person of the present tense has separate existential (oes, no plural because plural nouns take a singular verb) and descriptive (yw/ydyw, ŷnt/ydynt) forms, except in the situations where the positive (mae, maent) or relative (sydd) forms are used in their place.

		Singular	Plural
Preterite	1st Person	bûm	buom
Preterite	2nd Person	buost	buoch
Preterite	3rd Person	bu	buont
Preterite	Impersonal	buwyd	
Future	1st Person	byddaf	byddwn
Future	2nd Person	byddi	byddwch
Future	3rd Person	bydd	byddant
Future	Impersonal	byddir	
Present	1st Person	wyf, ydwyf	ŷm, ydym
Present	2nd Person	wyt, ydwyt	ych, ydych
Present	3rd Person	yw, ydyw; oes; mae; sydd	ŷnt, ydynt; maent
Present	Impersonal	ydys	

		Singular	Plural
Imperfect	1st Person	oeddwn	oeddem
Imperfect	2nd Person	oeddit	oeddech
Imperfect	3rd Person	oedd, ydoedd	oeddynt, oeddent
Imperfect	Impersonal	oeddid	
Conditional	1st Person	buaswn	buasem
Conditional	2nd Person	buasit	buasech
Conditional	3rd Person	buasai	buasent
Conditional	Impersonal	buasid	
Consuetudinal Imperfect	1st Person	byddwn	byddem
Consuetudinal Imperfect	2nd Person	byddit	byddech
Consuetudinal Imperfect	3rd Person	byddai	byddent
Consuetudinal Imperfect	Impersonal	byddid	

		Singular	Plural
Present Subjunctive	1st Person	bwyf, byddwyf	bôm, byddom
Present Subjunctive	2nd Person	bych, byddych	boch, byddoch
Present Subjunctive	3rd Person	bo, byddo	bônt, byddont
Present Subjunctive	Impersonal	bydder	
Imperfect Subjunctive	1st Person	bawn	baem
Imperfect Subjunctive	2nd Person	bait	baech
Imperfect Subjunctive	3rd Person	bai	baent
Imperfect Subjunctive	Impersonal	byddid	
Imperative	1st Person	(does not exist)	byddwn
Imperative	2nd Person	bydd	byddwch
Imperative	3rd Person	bydded, boed, bid	byddent
Imperative	Impersonal	bydder	

In less formal styles, the affirmative/indirect relative (y(r)), interrogative/direct relative (a), and negative (ni(d)) particles have a particularly strong tendency to become infixed on the front of forms of bod, for instance roedd and dyw for yr oedd and nid yw. Although the literary language tends toward keeping the particles in full, affirmative y is optional before mae(nt).

Reduplicating the negation of the verb with ddim (which in the literary language strictly means "any" rather than "not") is generally avoided.

Certain other verbs with bod in the verb-noun are also to some extent irregular. By far the most irregular are gwybod ("to know (a fact)") and adnabod ("to recognize/know (a person)"); but there also exists a group of verbs that alternate -bu- (in the preterite and pluperfect) and -bydd- (in all other tenses) stems, namely canfod ("to perceive"), cydnabod ("to acknowledge"), cyfarfod ("to meet"), darfod ("to perish"), darganfod ("to discover"), gorfod ("to be obliged"), and hanfod ("to descend/issue from").

Therefore, presented below are gwybod and adnabod in the tenses where they do not simply add gwy- or adna- to forms of bod. That they both, like bod, separate the present and future tenses. A regular feature of this mood is the devoicing of b to p before the subjunctive endings,.

		Singular	Plural
Present	1st Person	gwn	gwyddom
Present	2nd Person	gwyddost	gwyddoch
Present	3rd Person	gŵyr	gwyddant
Present	Impersonal	gwyddys	
Imperfect	1st Person	gwyddwn	gwyddem
Imperfect	2nd Person	gwyddit	gwyddech
Imperfect	3rd Person	gwyddai	gwyddent
Imperfect	Impersonal	gwyddid	
Present Subjunctive	1st Person	gwypwyf, gwybyddwyf	gwypom, gwybyddom
Present Subjunctive	2nd Person	gwypych, gwybyddych	gwypoch, gwybyddoch
Present Subjunctive	3rd Person	gwypo, gwybyddo	gwypont, gwybyddont
Present Subjunctive	Impersonal	gwyper, gwybydder	
Imperfect Subjunctive	1st Person	gwypwn, gwybyddwn	gwypem, gwybyddem
Imperfect Subjunctive	2nd Person	gwypit, gwybyddit	gwypech, gwybyddech
Imperfect Subjunctive	3rd Person	gwypai, gwybyddai	gwypent, gwybyddent
Imperfect Subjunctive	Impersonal	gwypid, gwybyddid	
Imperative	1st Person	(does not exist)	gwybyddwn
Imperative	2nd Person	gwybydd	gwybyddwch
Imperative	3rd Person	gwybydded	gwybyddent
Imperative	Impersonal	gwybydder	

		Singular	Plural
Present	1st Person	adwaen	adwaenom
Present	2nd Person	adwaenost	adwaenoch
Present	3rd Person	adwaen, edwyn	adwaenant
Present	Impersonal	adwaenir	
Imperfect	1st Person	adwaenwn	adwaenem
Imperfect	2nd Person	adwaenit	adwaenech
Imperfect	3rd Person	adwaenai	adwaenent
Imperfect	Impersonal	adwaenid	
Subjunctive	1st Person	adnapwyf, adnabyddwyf	adnapom, adnabyddom
Subjunctive	2nd Person	adnepych, adnabyddych	adnapoch, adnabyddoch
Subjunctive	3rd Person	adnapo, adnabyddo	adnapont, adnabyddont
Subjunctive	Impersonal	adnaper, adnabydder	
Imperative	1st Person	(does not exist)	adnabyddwn
Imperative	2nd Person	adnebydd	adnabyddwch
Imperative	3rd Person	adnabydded	adnabyddent
Imperative	Impersonal	adnabydder	

==== Mynd, gwneud, cael, and dod ====
The four verbs mynd "to go", gwneud "to do", cael "to get", and dod "to come" are all irregular. These share many similarities, but there are also far more points of difference in their literary forms than in their spoken ones. Each also has at least one other verbal-noun form of which the colloquial forms are contractions: mynd / myned; dod / dyfod / dywad / dŵad; cael / caffael / caffel; gwneud / gwneuthur. Literary Welsh is remarkable in that it has imperative forms of cael which are absent from the spoken language.

		mynd, myned		gwneud, gwneuthur		cael, caffael, caffel		dod, dyfod, dywad, dŵad	
		Singular	Plural	Singular	Plural	Singular	Plural	Singular	Plural
Preterite	1st Person	euthum	aethom	gwneuthum	gwnaethom	cefais	cawsom	deuthum	daethom
Preterite	2nd Person	aethost	aethoch	gwnaethost	gwnaethoch	cefaist	cawsoch	daethost	daethoch
Preterite	3rd Person	aeth	aethant	gwnaeth	gwnaethant	cafodd	cawsant	daeth	daethant
Preterite	Impersonal	aethpwyd, aed		gwnaethpwyd, gwnaed		cafwyd, caed		daethpwyd, deuwyd, doed	
Non-past	1st Person	af	awn	gwnaf	gwnawn	caf	cawn	deuaf, dof	deuwn, down
Non-past	2nd Person	ei	ewch	gwnei	gwnewch	cei	cewch	deui, doi	deuwch, dewch, dowch
Non-past	3rd Person	â	ânt	gwna	gwnânt	caiff	cânt	daw	deuant, dônt
Non-past	Impersonal	eir		gwneir		ceir		deuir, doir	
Imperfect	1st Person	awn	aem	gwnawn	gwnaem	cawn	caem	deuwn, down	deuem, doem
Imperfect	2nd Person	ait	aech	gwnait	gwnaech	caet	caech	deuit, doit	deuech, doech
Imperfect	3rd Person	âi	aent	gwnâi	gwnaent	câi	caent	deuai, dôi	deuent, doent
Imperfect	Impersonal	eid		gwneid		ceid		deuid, doid	
Pluperfect	1st Person	aethwn, elswn	aethem, elsem	gwnaethwn, gwnelswn	gwnaethem, gwnelsem	cawswn	cawsem	daethwn	daethem
Pluperfect	2nd Person	aethit, elsit	aethech, elsech	gwnaethit, gwnelsit	gwnaethech, gwnelsech	cawsit	cawsech	daethit	daethech
Pluperfect	3rd Person	aethai, elsai	aethent, elsent	gwnaethai, gwnelsai	gwnaethent, gwnelsent	cawsai	cawsent	daethai	daethent
Pluperfect	Impersonal	aethid, elsid		gwnaethid, gwnelsid		cawsid		daethid	
(Present) Subjunctive	1st Person	elwyf	elom	gwnelwyf	gwnelom	caffwyf	caffom	delwyf	delom
(Present) Subjunctive	2nd Person	elych	eloch	gwnelych	gwneloch	ceffych	caffoch	delych	deloch
(Present) Subjunctive	3rd Person	êl, elo	elont	gwnêl, gwnelo	gwnelont	caffo	caffont	dêl, delo	delont
(Present) Subjunctive	Impersonal	eler		gwneler		caffer		deler	
Imperfect Subjunctive	1st Person	elwn	elem	gwnelwn	gwnelem	caffwn, cawn	caffem, caem	(Same as Imperfect)	(Same as Imperfect)
Imperfect Subjunctive	2nd Person	elit	elech	gwnelit	gwnelech	caffit, cait	caffech, caech	(Same as Imperfect)	(Same as Imperfect)
Imperfect Subjunctive	3rd Person	elai	elent	gwnelai	gwnelent	caffai, câi	caffent, caent	(Same as Imperfect)	(Same as Imperfect)
Imperfect Subjunctive	Impersonal	elid		gwnelid		ceffid, ceid		(Same as Imperfect)	
Imperative	1st Person	(none)	awn	(none)	gwnawn	(none)	cawn	(none)	deuwn, down
Imperative	2nd Person	dos	ewch	gwna	gwnewch	ca	cewch	tyr(e)d	deuwch, dewch, dowch
Imperative	3rd Person	aed, eled	aent, elent	gwnaed, gwneled	gwnaent, gwnelent	caffed, caed	caffent, caent	deued, doed, deled	deuent, doent, delent
Imperative	Impersonal	aer, eler		gwnaer, gwneler		ceffid		deuer, doer, deler	

== Prepositions ==
In Welsh, prepositions frequently change their form when followed by a pronoun. These are known as inflected prepositions. They fall into three main conjugations.

Firstly those in -a- (at, am (stem: amdan-), ar, tan/dan):

		Singular	Plural
1st Person		ataf	atom
2nd Person		atat	atoch
3rd Person	Masculine	ato	atynt
3rd Person	Feminine	ati	atynt

Secondly those in -o- (er, heb, rhag, rhwng (stem: rhyng-), tros/dros, trwy/drwy (stem: trw-/drw-), o (stem: ohon-), yn). All apart from o add a linking element in the third person (usually -dd-, but -ydd- in the case of trwy/drwy, and -t- in the case of tros/dros):

		Singular	Plural
1st Person		erof	erom
2nd Person		erot	eroch
3rd Person	Masculine	erddo	erddynt
3rd Person	Feminine	erddi	erddynt

Thirdly, those in -y- (gan and wrth). Gan includes both vowel changes and a linking element, while wrth has neither:

		Singular	Plural
1st Person		gennyf	gennym
2nd Person		gennyt	gennych
3rd Person	Masculine	ganddo	ganddynt
3rd Person	Feminine	ganddi	ganddynt

Finally, the preposition i is highly irregular:

		Singular	Plural
1st Person		imi, im	inni, in
2nd Person		iti, it	ichwi
3rd Person	Masculine	iddo	iddynt
3rd Person	Feminine	iddi	iddynt

All inflected prepositions may optionally be followed by the appropriate personal pronouns, apart from i, where this is only possible in the third person, thanks to its proper endings in the other persons sounding the same as the pronouns. In slightly less formal Welsh, the endings are split off the first and second persons of i to be interpreted as pronouns instead, although this creates the anomalous pronoun mi.

The majority of prepositions (am, ar, at, gan, heb, hyd, i, o, tan/dan, tros/dros, trwy/drwy, wrth) trigger the soft mutation. The exceptions are â, gyda, and tua, which cause the aspirate mutation; yn, which causes the nasal mutation; and cyn, ger, mewn, rhag, and rhwng, which do not cause any mutation.
