= Hungarian noun phrase =

Overview of noun phrases in Hungarian

In Hungarian grammar, the unmarked order of elements in the noun phrase is determiner, adjective, noun.

== Grammatical marking ==
=== Grammatical gender ===
Hungarian does not have grammatical gender and uses a single third‑person singular pronoun ő ("he, she, it") which does not distinguish gender or animacy; this uniformity extends to verb conjugation and related forms.

=== Grammatical distinction between animate and inanimate things ===
The kinds of grammatical distinctions present between animate and inanimate things are corresponding to English's, although it appears different because, contrary to Hungarian, in English the distinction can only be explicit. In addition, just like English, a definite article may refer to an inanimate object rather than to a sentient being.

However, there are some more drastic differences regarding the Hungarian language:

1. The words "this", and "that" ("ez", and "az") are often used to refer to people instead of "she", and "he" ("ő")
2. "ő" is often used to refer to inanimate objects
3. People are often referred to by putting the definitive article "a", or "az" right before their names
  - For example, in English, it would be similar to saying "I told you that the John is absent"

=== Plurality ===
Generally speaking, Hungarian words can either be singular or plural. Unlike in the English language, there are no countable or uncountable plural cases. However, in Hungarian there are possessed and not possessed plural cases. Since the possessor may also be plural, the plural case is marked with either or both of two possible marks:

1. k Hungarian pronunciation: [k]
2. i Hungarian pronunciation: [i]

Neither i, nor k marks are the complete mark itself, but the main part of the mark.

- Every other vowel, or consonant around these are procedural
- The presence of such additional consonant, or vowel are pronounced in its entirety, and either has, or has nothing to do to the meaning

==== The k mark ====
k mark is for nouns, verbs, and adjectives

- Adjectives are in case that they are used predicatively (see adjective marking)
- There are many verb exceptions (some example are -ik verbs, and certain indefinite conjugations)

So very basically k mark is used to mark

1. for verbs: the number of actors
2. for both nouns, and adjectives
  1. the plurality of things
  2. the plurality of a single thing's possessors
  3. the plurality of multiple things' possessors

k mark is also used specifically for proper nouns specifically with vowel "é" Hungarian pronunciation: [eː] right before it, and that means a group of people related to that proper name. It is possible...

- ...to refer to a family using the family name itself, or a family member's name
- ...to refer to a team using a member's name from the team
- ...to refer to a faction using one of its member's name
- etc...
  - For example "Boldizsáréknál ma lecsó volt vacsorára" means "Boldizsár's family (, or team) had ratatouille for dinner today (, or they had it in his house, or at his place)"

==== The i mark ====
Contrary to English, Hungarian language tells the kind of plural case apart when multiple objects are possessed by something using i instead of k mark

For example, in Hungarian language...

1. ...in case of "dogs" the k mark is used
2. ...in case "his dogs" the i mark is used

So very basically a noun's, or an adjective's count is marked with the i mark, but only when it is possessed by something

- This renders the k mark in the same noun, or adjective to mark the count of its possessors if the possessor is plural
- Note that verbs can not be possessed so the i mark is not for verbs
  - For verbs there is going to be ni suffix (no longer a mark) which is going to cast the verb into a special type of verb that can be used in place of a noun, although its plurality must be singular implicitly, but maybe infinitive verbs can be considered as the "possessed" verbs in Hungarian language
  - Verbs used as nouns specifically with the s verb mark (or according to some "-ás", "-és" verb suffixes) can be possessed, and marked with the i mark when such nouns are plural

==== Plural mark generally ====
For both marks a different vowel may be present right before it

- Even in case of the i mark: it makes the i often pronounced as "yee" or "Hungarian pronunciation: [ji]" despite letter j Hungarian pronunciation: [j] is not written

In case the addition of a new vowel would result in way too many vowels in the same place, the words last vowel (last by that time) is changed instead of a new vowel added

- In case the root word only consists of two vowels, no vowel is taken away, or changed, except "é" Hungarian pronunciation: [eː] is added between i, and the last vowel
  - Hungarian people often refers to Europe as "Eu" Hungarian pronunciation: [ɛu], or the female Greek name "Io" Hungarian pronunciation: [ioː] are susceptible to such pronunciation
- Which vowel to put before either of the two marks is based on vowel harmony, that is demonstrated with underlines in the next examples

The addition, or change of a vowel is necessary when i mark is used, but conventional to the usage of the k mark

In case of i: the i part of the word is emphasized with an additional vowel right before the i because it changes its meaning. i alone at the end of a noun, or even at the end of an adjective would mean "from there", "at there" rather than the thing was possessed, and plural

- For example, root word "sarok" (meaning "corner") with i:
  1. "sarki" means "polar", or "from the pole", or "at the corner" (also saroki - "polar" not so much, but the others)
  2. "sarkai" means "her, his, its corners" (also sarokjai - it is less common)
  3. note that "sarkai" logically also means "from her, his, its corners", but it is uncommon to be meant that way because that meaning is rather expressed explicitly
  4. Also note that from the word sarki the vowel is even missing before the i mark, although sarka means "her, his, its corner" singular
    - Consonant clutters that are easy to pronounce (e.g.: "rk" Hungarian pronunciation: [rk]) are often more advantageous to pronounce compared to them with a vowel between generally speaking in Hungarian language, although saroki, and sarokjai are intelligible, and even used often

In case of k: the additional vowel conventionally makes the word easier to be pronounced, and it does not create ambiguity

- For example Hungarian: kalapács, lit. 'hammer' + k = Hungarian: kalapácsok, lit. 'hammers'
- Unlike i, k may even change the last vowel when it would not result in ambiguity, for example: "tree" is "fa", and "trees" are "fák" in Hungarian language

Before specifically the k mark often n Hungarian pronunciation: [n] is put instead of a vowel, in which case meaning is changed

- For example Hungarian: kalapács, lit. 'hammer' + nk = Hungarian: kalapácsunk, lit. 'our hammer'
- Although in this case k is still plurality marker, but it marks the possessor's plurality
- It is worth mentioning that in this case written n right before k is pronounced Hungarian pronunciation: [ŋ]

Before k mark t Hungarian pronunciation: [t] may be present with a vowel between t, and k without the root word ending with t by default

- For example Hungarian: kalapács, lit. 'hammer' + t(right after the root, and then) + k = Hungarian: kalapácsotok, lit. 'your hammer'
- In this case k is still plurality marker, but it marks the possessor's plurality again
- Also when...
  1. ...t appears after k
  2. ...or t appears without k
  3. ...or two ts appear before, and after k
- ...the t after means accusative case (see also Accusative case)
- For example, to the question: Hungarian: Mit csodált meg?, lit. 'What did he admire?' - the answers may be:
  1. A kalapács + t = A kalapácsot - The hammer
  2. A kalapács + k + t = A kalapácsokat - The hammers
  3. A kalapács + t + k + t = A kalapácsotokat - Your hammer
  4. A kalapács + i + t + k + t = A kalapácsaitokat - Your hammers
- Note that t is underlined on the verb because it is the mark of past tense, not accusative case

More examples:

- For example, root word "kutya" (meaning "dog") with i:
  1. "kutyai" means "from the dog", or "at the dog"
  2. "kutyái" means "its dogs" (or notably yet uncommonly "from its dogs")
  3. "kutyák" just means "dogs"
- There are cases when ambiguity is not avoided for example to the word "szelő" (meaning "cutter") with i:
  1. "szelői" means both "from cutter", and "its cutters"
  2. Although it does not mean "from its cutters" because that would be "szelőii, or szelői-i"
  3. "szelők" just means "cutters"

Summary for everything above:

1. in English: dog -> dogs -> her dogs, his dogs, its dogs
2. in Hungarian: kutya -> kutyák -> kutyái, kutyái, kutyái

==== Both plural marks ====
So things that are possessed, and there are multiple of contain the i mark, but when the possessor is plural too both i, and k marks are used.

1. A single dog is owned by multiple people (using only k):
  - Hungarian: kutyánk, lit. 'our dog'
  - Hungarian: kutyátok, lit. 'your dog'
  - Hungarian: kutyájuk, lit. 'their dog'
2. Multiple dogs are owned by multiple people (using both i, and k):
  - Hungarian: kutyáink, lit. 'our dogs'
  - Hungarian: kutyáitok, lit. 'your dogs'
  - Hungarian: kutyáik, lit. 'their dogs'

Note that before the other kind of i mark was mentioned (with meaning "from", or "at the"). That mark comes after k in case any, or both plurality markers are used. It is possible to talk about abstract placement of things generally using the other kind of i marker

- For example: "A napjainki hírességek már nem annyira szépek" - "Famous people of these days are no longer as beautiful" literally told as: "Famous people of our days are no longer as beautiful"

Hungarian language makes difference between "you" singular, and "you" plural for all of the related words' cases, cases of "you", and even for the word "you" itself (which are "te" in singular, and "ti" in plural forms)

For singular case of "you" the above example is as follows:

1. A single dog is owned by a single person (using no k, no i):
  - Hungarian: kutyád, lit. 'your dog'
2. Multiple dogs are owned by a single person (using only i):
  - Hungarian: kutyáid, lit. 'your dogs'
- Notice that there is no k mark at all because "you" in this case is singular

For the sake of completeness here are the remaining "dog cases":

1. A single dog is owned by a single person (using no k, no i):
  - Hungarian: kutyám, lit. 'my dog'
  - Hungarian: kutyája, lit. 'her, his, its dog'
2. Multiple dogs are owned by a single person (using only i):
  - Hungarian: kutyáim, lit. 'my dogs'
  - Hungarian: kutyái, lit. 'her, his, its dogs'

==== Usage of plural marks ====
Hungarian uses the plural form sparsely for nouns, i.e. only if quantity is not otherwise marked. Therefore, the plural is not used with numerals or quantity expressions.

- For example "fiúk" means "boys"
  1. "öt fiú" (without "k") means "five boys", but told as "five boy"
  2. also "sok fiú" (without "k") means "many boys", but told as "many boy", or "much boy" because in Hungarian there is no difference between countable, and uncountable plural cases

Unlike in English in phrases that refer to existence/availability of entities, rather than their quantity, the singular is used in Hungarian:

1. "Van szék a szobában" means "there are chairs in the room", but told as "there is chair in the room"
2. "Nincs szék a szobában" means "there are no chairs in the room" told as "there is no chair in the room"
  - The singular may be considered as partitive here
- Also, product names, things' type's, and kind's are usually written singular, e.g. "lámpa" meaning "lamps" (as a kind of product), or exactly "kind of lamp", but written, and meant as "lamp"

Hungarian also often uses a singular noun when the possessor is plural but the thing possessed would be plural too, e.g. "fejünk" means "our heads", but told as "our head".

- Since it is impossible for multiple people to possess the same head, it is immediately clear that it can not mean "our single head", and in case of other contexts with other words in which case the meaning is not clear: it is possible to say explicitly "fejeink" that is exactly translated to "our heads"
- Even in the "our heads"'s case it is ambiguous in both English, and Hungarian languages whether it refers to a group of people with each person possessing multiple heads, or a single head

==== The word "both" ====
Contrary to English, in Hungarian language there is no word for "both". Instead the word Hungarian: mind, lit. '"all", or "all of..."' is used before the number of things that are plural (but not plural grammatically as it was mentioned right above)

- For example: Hungarian: mindkettő, lit. 'both', or Hungarian: mindkét, lit. 'both', or Hungarian: mind a kettő, lit. 'both'

This allows Hungarian language to say any number of "pairs", not only "pairs" of two

- For example: Hungarian: mindhárom would mean "troth" maybe, but it can surely be translated to "all three"

Although it is worth mentioning that the word for Hungarian: pár, lit. 'pairs' is without "k", and it means a pair of two specifically

==== Pairs of items ====
Hungarian language never refers to boots as "boots", but always just "boot". The "boots" translation in Hungarian used to refer to multiple "boot" types, or to multiple "boot" pairs

- "bakancs", and "bakancsok" are translated to "boots", and "multiple boots"

There are exceptions for example "ikrek" meaning "twins", and other things that can be used, or interacted with separately, or things that are less related to one another, yet pairs.

Things that are not functional without its counterparts are never in plural case.

==== Pairs of body parts ====
Hungarian uses paired body parts in the singular, even if the pair is meant together, and even if several people's pairs of body parts are meant. One piece of a pair is described as: "egyik lába" meaning "one of his legs". As you can see Hungarian language grammatically does not expect both legs to be the same left, or the same right leg, therefore there is no comprehensive plural form to two different "human legs" (one is right, and one is left) according to its grammar's logic. The complete visualization is the following:

Hungarian: láb, lit. 'leg'	Singular possessor	Plural possessor
Singular possession	Hungarian: lába, lit. 'his, her, its leg'	Hungarian: lábuk, lit. 'their leg'
Plural possession	Hungarian: lábai, lit. 'his, her, its legs'	Hungarian: lábaik, lit. 'their legs'

Note the number of the noun in the following examples:

"Tánc közben összegabalyodott a lába" using "his/her/its leg"	Literally means "his/her/its legs got tangled up during the dance" (with his/her/its own ones)
"Tánc közben összegabalyodott a lábuk" using "their leg"	Literally means "their legs got tangled up during the dance": 1. Each person's own legs got tangled up – or –; 2. Each person's legs got tangled up with another's, affecting at most one leg per person – or –; 3. Both of each person's legs got tangled up, either with each other or with other people's legs. In other words, there likely remained no leg that had not got tangled up.

Note: if one wants to emphasize the third case (where both legs of each person involved), the actual plural number ("Tánc közben összegabalyodtak a lábaik" (using "their legs") might also be used, but the above (singular) option can fully suffice in this case, as well.

==== Apparent plural endings and homonymy ====
The letter k also occurs at the end of certain words, which thus may appear plural. Examples include "Hungarian: emlék, lit. 'a piece of memory'", "Hungarian: farok, lit. 'tail'", "Hungarian: köldök, lit. 'navel'", "Hungarian: könyök, lit. 'elbow'", "Hungarian: sarok, lit. 'corner, or heel'", "Hungarian: pocok, lit. 'vole'", "Hungarian: püspök, lit. 'bishop'", "Hungarian: érsek, lit. 'archbishop'", "Hungarian: szemöldök, lit. 'eyebrows (but singular)'", "Hungarian: zsák, lit. 'sack'", etc. – the name of the mole used to be "vakondok", but this form took on a plural meaning and the word is mostly used today as "vakond".

Homonymy may occur between a word in the singular and another in the plural. Examples:

- "Hungarian: farok, lit. 'tail in singular meaning, or bottoms, buttocks in plural meaning'"
  - Through "far" + "k" with filler vowel according to vowel harmony
- "Hungarian: pacák, lit. 'bloke, chap in singular meaning, or blots, blotches in plural meaning'"
  - Through "paca" + "k" with filler vowel according to vowel harmony, and a/e/o/ö lengthening before suffixes
- "Hungarian: telek, lit. 'lot (real estate) in singular meaning, or winters in plural meaning'"
  - Through "tél" + "k" with filler vowel according to vowel harmony, and vowel-shortening

== Person ==
The Hungarian language completely lacks grammatical gender.

- Neither the definite nor the indefinite articles have got any other inflexion markers whose logic may otherwise possibly be applied to any adjectives or nouns right after them, or instead of them.

=== Forms for "you" ===
Beside te (plural ti), which are used informally, there are polite forms for the second person pronouns: ön (plural önök) and maga (plural maguk). Ön is official and distancing, maga is personal and even intimate and some people think it has rude connotations. (There are some older forms for you, like kend, which is still used in rural areas.) See in more detail: T-V distinction for Hungarian.

The polite 2nd person forms ön and maga take the grammatical forms of the 3rd person, e.g. for verbs and possessive suffixes. For example, te kérsz (second person, informal), but ön kér or maga kér (second person, formal), just like ő kér (third person).

=== Impersonal usage ===
Hungarian does not have a distinct impersonal or generic pronoun (cf. English "one"), but there are two ways of expressing this:

- The 3rd person plural (Hungarian: ők, lit. 'they'), for example Hungarian: Azt mondják, hogy a lány bolond, lit. 'They say the girl is crazy.'
- The phrase Hungarian: az ember, lit. 'people generally', for example "Hungarian: Az ember nem is gondolna rá, lit. 'You would never think of it.'" is told as "People generally would never think of it", or literally "The human would never think of it"

Most of the time expression is not required. When it is expressed the expression is explicit. Generally when such sentences are translated to Hungarian a comparable word for the English "one"-ing structure is missing completely due to such thing's meaning is present in the context already. For example:

- - Hungarian: Melyik dobozban van a kendőm?, lit. 'In which box is my towel?'
- - Hungarian: A pirosban van., lit. 'It is in the red one.'

Also in Hungarian language it is very not common to hear an explicit expression translatable to the "one" word, yet in English it is very common to use the "one" word even if it is in the context already. In other words, English language can not leave the "one" word contrary to Hungarian.

Also the English "it" word itself is missing from many expressions that can only be translated to English with the "it" word. Therefore, the "it" (beside she, and he) word in the point of view of the Hungarian language is also a generic word for a person (because it is often missing the same)

- One of the most remarkable examples is Hungarian: Esik, lit. 'it rains'

== Determiners ==
=== Articles ===
Hungarian has definite and indefinite articles. The definite article, a, changes to az before a vowel. The indefinite article is egy [pronounced with a long final consonant], an unstressed version of the word for the number "one". Articles are invariable (i.e. not marked for number, case, etc.)

==== Differences in using the definite article ====
The definite article "a(z)" is applied more commonly than in English, for example in general statements, even before uncountable nouns, e.g. A szerelem csodálatos ("Love is wonderful"), and with plural nouns, e.g. A kiskutyák aranyosak ("Puppies are cute"). The latter sentence can thus have two meanings, either referring to specific dogs or puppies in general. However, in a semi-specific sense (when "some" could be inserted in English) the article is omitted in Hungarian, e.g. Ceruzákat tett az asztalra ("S/he put [some] pencils on the desk").

"A(z)" is used before holidays, when referring to a forthcoming or recent event (A karácsonyt a rokonokkal töltjük "We'll spend Christmas with the relatives") and also when referring to companies (A Coca Colánál dolgozik "S/he works for Coca Cola").

"A(z)" is used before names of months and days of the week in a general sense (Kedvenc hónapom a május, kedvenc napom a szombat "My favorite month is May and my favorite day is Saturday.") However, it's omitted in statements about the current month or day, with the verb van/volt/lesz (Aznap szombat volt "It was Saturday that day", Holnap már május van "It's May tomorrow").

This article is also used after ez/az as a determiner ("this, that"), e.g. ez a szék ("this chair"), as well as (usually) before the possession (az asztalom or az én asztalom "my desk").

Sometimes the definite article (specifically the one with zed "az") is used as topic marker even when the next word's first letter is not a vowel. In that case the meaning of such topic marker is "the only one of...", or "the very...". Although this practice is quiet common as of 2025 it is likely not something that can be referred to as a "grammar rule".

==== Differences in using the zero article ====
No article is normally used (especially in literary language):

- before indefinite noun phrases as predicates, e.g. A nővérem tanár ("My elder sister is [a] teacher"),
- before "theatre" and "cinema" (színházba/moziba megy "go to the theatre/cinema") unless a specific, particular venue is meant,
- in "have" statements before the indefinite possession, especially if the number is unimportant or unknown, e.g. Van gyerekük? ("Do you have children?", literally, "Do you have [a] child?") or Van nálam toll ("I have a pen / pens with me") and
- before the subject in "there is" constructions, especially in a sentence-initial position, e.g. Szellem van a konyhában ("There is [a] ghost in the kitchen").

==== Before country names ====
The definite article is used before country names in the following cases:

- when it comprises an adjective formed with -i: a Dél-afrikai Köztársaság [Republic of South Africa], a Dominikai Közösség, a Dominikai Köztársaság, a Kongói Köztársaság, a Kongói Demokratikus Köztársaság, a Közép-afrikai Köztársaság [Central Africal Republic], a Zöld-foki Köztársaság [Cape Verde], including the longer names of countries which comprise an adjective with "-i", e.g. a Kínai Népköztársaság "the People's Republic of China"
- which are formally in the plural: az (Amerikai) Egyesült Államok [USA], az Egyesült Arab Emírségek [UAE], and the short form a Bahamák (~ a Bahama-szigetek)
  - including the plural form szigetek ("islands") at the end of the name: a Bahama-szigetek, a Comore-szigetek, a Fidzsi-szigetek, a Fülöp-szigetek [the Philippines], a Saint Vincent és a Grenadine-szigetek, a Salamon-szigetek, a Maldív-szigetek, a Marshall-szigetek, a Seychelle-szigetek,
- and before the names az Egyesült Királyság [UK] and a Vatikán.

(Note: the Gambia and the Netherlands are no exceptions; they have no article in Hungarian.)

==== Other proper nouns ====
Cities never have articles in Hungarian (not even The Hague, simply Hága).

In contrast with English, "the" is used before the following types:

- streets, squares, and parks (a Váci utca "Váci Street", a Central Park)
- public buildings (a canterburyi katedrális), including railway stations and airports (a Waterloo pályaudvar "Waterloo Station")
- bridges (a Szabadság híd "Freedom Bridge")
- hills and mountains (a Gellért-hegy "Gellért Hill", a Mount Everest)
- woods, forests, gardens, and valleys (a Szilícium-völgy "Silicon Valley")
- lakes, bays, and gulfs (a Balaton "Lake Balaton", az Ontario-tó "Lake Ontario", a Hudson-öböl "Hudson Bay")
- islands and peninsulas (a Margit-sziget "Margaret Island")
- and planets (a Mars, a Szaturnusz, a Jupiter).

As a result, a Niger refers to the river while Niger refers to the country. People can colloquially say a Móriczon találkozunk (literally "we'll meet on the Móricz"), where the definite article indicates the square as opposed to the person (Zsigmond Móricz). Also, Japán on its own refers to the country while a japán can refer to a Japanese person or thing.

=== Demonstrative determiners ===
The demonstrative determiners (often inaccurately called demonstrative adjectives in English) are ez a/ez az ("this") and az a/az az ("that").

== Numerals ==
Hungarian numbers follow an extremely regular, decimal format. There are distinct words for 1 to 9, 10, 20, 30, 100, 1000 and 1000000. The tens from 40 to 90 are formed by adding -van/-ven to the digit. When the numbers 10 and 20 are followed by a digit, they are suffixed with -on/-en/-ön/-n (on the oblique stem). Compound numbers are formed simply by joining the elements together. Examples:

- öt ("five")
- tíz ("ten")
- tizenöt ("fifteen")
- ötvenöt ("fifty-five")
- százötvenöt ("one hundred and fifty-five")

As in English, a number can function as a determiner or as a stand-alone noun. As a noun it can take all the usual suffixes.

Suffixes used only on numerals and hány ("how many?"):

- -odik/(-adik)/-edik/-ödik for ordinal numbers, e.g. ötödik ("the fifth")
- -od/(-ad)/-ed/-öd for fractional numbers, e.g. ötöd ("a fifth")
- -os/(-as)/-es/-ös for adjectival numbers (numeric adjectives), e.g. ötös

The numeric adjectives do not have an exact equivalent in English. They are used when English uses a construction such as "bus number 11": a tizenegyes busz, "room 303": a háromszázhármas szoba.

== Quantity expressions ==
Suffixes used specifically with numerals, hány ("how many?") and other quantity expressions:

- -szor/-szer/-ször for how many times, e.g. ötször ("five times"), sokszor ("many times")
- -féle and -fajta for "kind(s) of", e.g. ötfajta ("five kinds of")
- -an/-en/-n for numeric adverbs

The use of the adverbs suffixed with -an/-en/-n is best illustrated by examples: Sokan voltunk. ("There were a lot of us.") Öten vannak. ("There are 5 of them.") Ketten mentünk. ("Two of us went.")

== Possession ==
=== Possessive suffixes ===
In Hungarian, pronominal possession is expressed by suffixes applied to the noun. The following suffixes are used for singular nouns:

	Singular	Plural
1st person	-om/-am/-em/-öm/-m a(z én) házam my house	-unk/-ünk/-nk a (mi) házunk our house
2nd person (informal)	-od/(-ad)/-ed/-öd/-d a (te) házad your (singular) house	-otok/(-atok)/-etek/-ötök/-tok/-tek/-tök a (ti) házatok your (plural) house
3rd person and 2nd person (formal or official)	-a/-e/-ja/-je a(z ő) háza his/her/its house a(z ön) háza your (formal) house	-uk/-ük/-juk/-jük a(z ő) házuk their house a házuk / az önök háza (!) your (fml, pl) house.

The following suffixes are used for plural nouns:

	Singular	Plural
1st person	-aim/-eim/-im az (én) házaim my houses	-aink/-eink/-ink a (mi) házaink our houses
2nd person (informal)	-aid/-eid/-id a (te) házaid your (singular) houses	-aitok/-eitek/-itok/-itek a (ti) házaitok your (plural) houses
3rd person and 2nd person (formal or official)	-ai/-ei/-i a(z ő) házai his/her/its houses a(z ön) házai your (formal) houses	-aik/-eik/-ik a(z ő) házaik their houses a házaik / az önök házai (!) your (fml, pl) houses

The háza, házai type (i.e., like the one with a singular possessor) is used in the 3rd person plural except when no pronoun or only the ő is present before it, e.g. a szülők háza "the parents' house". In other words, the plural -k of the 3rd person suffix is left from the noun if there is a lexical possessor preceding it.

The definite article is usually used. It can be omitted in a poetic or literary style. It may also be omitted at the beginning of the sentence in colloquial speech.

The possessor can be emphasized by adding the subject pronoun, e.g. az én házam ("my house"). In this case the definite article must be used. For the 3rd person plural, the 3rd person singular pronoun is used, e.g. az ő házuk (not az ők házuk).

==== Words with -j ====
Certain consonant-final stems always use the suffixes with -j for a singular noun with a 3rd person singular possessor, e.g. kalap ("hat"): kalapja ("his/her hat"). This group also uses the -j for a singular noun with a 3rd person plural possessor, e.g. kalapjuk ("their hat"). The -j is also inserted for a plural noun (with a possessor of whichever person and number), e.g. kalapjaim ("my hats"), kalapjaid ("your (sg. fam.) hats"), kalapjai ("his hats"), etc.

The two most common types are the following:

Type	his/her xxx	their xxx	my your his/her our your their	xxx's	Other examples
Without -j (see above)	háza	házuk	házai etc.		(all words with c cs dzs sz z s zs j ny ty gy h)
Without -j (see above)	×	×	×		(all words with c cs dzs sz z s zs j ny ty gy h)
Mostly with -j	×	(kalapuk)	×		hang, papír, program
Mostly with -j	kalapja	kalapjuk	kalapjai etc.		hang, papír, program

There is much variance, but in general, the -j variant is usually safer than the variant without -j, except with the specific endings listed above. (Usually the variant without -j is more traditional and the one with -j is more recent.)

Where a form applies the j, the other forms will apply it too. An exception is the uncommon type of barát ("friend") where the -j type is incorrect with a plural noun: barátja ("his/her friend"), barátjuk ("their friend") but barátaik ("their friends"), without j. The other most common examples of this type are előd, 'predecessor', and utód, 'successor'. However, there are areas where the -j type is correct for these words too.

==== Word endings and suffix types ====
Several endings (c, cs, dzs, sz, z, s, zs, j, ny, ty, gy, h, i.e., affricates, spirants, palatal/ized sounds and h) only allow the variant without -j in both singular and plural, as shown in the charts above. On the other hand, the words that always take the -j variant form a rather small group: only those ending in f or ch.

For the other endings, there are no clear-cut rules (so these forms are to be learnt one by one), but there are some regularities. Words with a long vowel or another consonant preceding the ending consonant often take the -j variant, as well as international words (e.g. programja, oxigénje, fesztiválja "his/her program, oxygen, festival"). Vowel-dropping and vowel-shortening stems always use the variant without -j, just like most words using -a as linking vowel (e.g. házat, házak "house": háza "his/her house").

- The endings v, l, r, m, g, k usually take the variant without -j (e.g. gyereke, asztala "his/her child, table"), but a minority among them take it (e.g. hangja, diákja "his/her voice, student" but again könyve, száma "his/her book, number").
- For words ending in n, p, t, the regularities are basically similar, but there is wide variance. Words ending in -at/-et (a suffix), however, usually take the variant without -j.
- The majority of words ending in b, d use the -j suffix (e.g. darabja, családja "his/her/its piece, family" but lába, térde "his/her leg, knee").

==== Apparent possessive suffixes and homonymy ====
Certain words (with or without suffixes) have endings which are identical with a possessive suffix. Examples:

Homonymous word	Interpretation without the possessive suffix		Interpretation with the possessive suffix			
Homonymous word	Parsing	Meaning	Parsing	Meaning	Person	Number
szám	(base form)	"number"/"song"	száj + ‑m	"my mouth"	1st	singular
hullám	(base form)	"wave" (n)	hulla + ‑m	"my corpse"	1st	singular
állam	(base form)	"state" (as in politics)	áll + ‑am	"my chin"	1st	singular
áram	(base form)	"current" (as in water/electricity)	ár + ‑am	"my price"	1st	singular
perem	(base form)	"(b)rim"	per + ‑em	"my lawsuit"	1st	singular
karom	(base form)	"claw"	kar + ‑om	"my arm"	1st	singular
erőd	(base form)	"fortress"	erő + ‑d	"your strength"	2nd	singular
kacsa	(base form)	"duck"	kacs + ‑a	"its tendril"	3rd	singular
váza	(base form)	"vase"	váz + ‑a	"its framework"	3rd	singular
fánk	(base form)	"doughnut"	fa + ‑nk	"our tree"	1st	plural
apátok	apát + ‑ok plural	"abbots"	apa + ‑tok	"your [pl.] father"	2nd	plural
falatok	falat + ‑ok plural	"pieces/bites of food"	fal + ‑atok	"your [pl.] wall"	2nd	plural
szemetek	szemét + ‑ek plural	"pieces of trash"	szem + ‑etek	"your [pl.] eye[s]"	2nd	plural
sütőtök	(base form)	"squash" (lit. "baking pumpkin")	sütő + ‑tök	"your [pl.] oven"	2nd	plural
áruk	áru + ‑k plural	"wares, products"	ár + ‑uk	"their price"	3rd	plural

Notes:

- For the szemét → szemet(ek) change, see Oblique noun stem.
- For the apa → apá(tok), hulla → hullá(m) change, see Oblique noun stem.
- For the plural marked with "[s]" in "your [pl.] eye[s]", see Pairs of body parts.
- For the different link vowels after words taken as absolute or relative stems (like fánk and sütőtök here), see The accusative suffix after other suffixes.

A homonymy is also possible between the same possessive ending of two unrelated words, if one ends in a consonant and the other in a vowel: falunk may be parsed as falu + ‑nk ("our village") or fal + ‑unk ("our wall").

A similar kind of homonymy may arise with vowel-dropping words (see the dolog/dolg- type under Oblique noun stem). Examples:

Lexeme with vowel-dropping stem		Lexeme with regular stem	
Nominative	Nominative with possessive suffix	Nominative	Nominative with possessive suffix
alom (litter [of animals])	alma (his/her/its litter)	alma (apple)	almája (his/her/its apple)
érem (medal)	érme (his/her medal)	érme (coin)	érméje (his/her coin)
halom (pile, stack)	halma (its pile/stack)	halma (halma)	halmája (his/her halma)
karizom (arm muscle)	karizma (his/her arm muscle)	karizma (charisma)	karizmája (his/her/its charisma)
karom (claw[s])	karma (its claw[s])	karma (karma)	karmája (his/her/its karma)

Note that the first person singular possessive form of hal (fish) is not the above halom but exceptionally halam, cf. a link vowel.

Examples:

A kiskutya bepiszkította az almát. (The puppy soiled its litter OR the apple.)
Bedobta az érmét a folyóba. (He/she threw his/her medal OR the coin into the river.)
A macskának fontos a karma. (Its claws OR the karma is/are important for a cat.)

Finally, another kind of homonymy may arise between a noun with a possessive suffix and a verb: hasad "your stomach (belly)" or "it tears/rips", árad "your price" or "it floods", fogad "your tooth" or "he/she/it receives/accepts"/"he/she/it bets".

=== Possessive construction with 2 nouns ===
There are 2 possible forms for a possessive construction with 2 nouns. In both of them the noun which is possessed takes the 3rd person possessive suffix.

1. The possessor is an unsuffixed noun, e.g. István lakása ("István's flat/apartment")
2. The possessor is a noun suffixed with -nak/-nek and the possessed noun is preceded by a/az, e.g. Istvánnak a lakása ("István's flat/apartment")

The first form is used as default and the second is used to emphasize the possessor or for clarity. It also enables the possessor to be moved within the sentence, e.g. Ennek a lakásnak sehogy se találom a kulcsát ("I can't possibly find the key of this flat/apartment"). Note the sehogy se találom ("I can't possibly find") wedged in between the parts of the possessive structure.

If the 3rd person plural possessor is a lexical word, not a pronoun (thus the plurality is marked on it), the possession will be marked like the 3rd person singular: a szülők lakása (not a szülők lakásuk) ("the parents' flat/apartment"). In other words, the plurality of the 3rd person plural possession is only marked once: either on the possessor (in the case of lexical words) or on the possession (in the case of pronouns), cf. az ő lakásuk (above).

=== Possessive pronouns ===
The following pronouns are used to replace singular nouns:

		Singular	Plural
1st person		az enyém	a mienk/a miénk
2nd person	(informal) (formal) (official)	a tied/a tiéd a magáé az öné	a tietek/a tiétek a maguké az önöké
3rd person		az övé	az övék

Note: Where two variants are given, the one with a long vowel is more literary.

The following pronouns are used to replace plural nouns:

		Singular	Plural
1st person		az enyéim	a mieink
2nd person	(informal) (formal) (official)	a tieid a magáéi az önéi	a tieitek a magukéi az önökéi
3rd person		az övéi	az övéik

=== -é/-éi to replace possessed noun ===
The suffixes -é/-éi are used to express possession when the noun is not stated:

- Istváné: "Istvan's", for singular noun: "the thing belonging to Istvan",
- Istvánéi: "Istvan's", for plural noun: "the things belonging to Istvan".

Hence comes the unusual vowel sequence: fiaiéi, which means "those belonging to his/her sons". Fia- (his/her son) -i- (several sons) -é- (belonging to) -i (several possessions).

The suffixes are also used to form the question word kié ("whose?").

== Positional suffixes ==
Hungarian follows a strict logic for suffixes relating to position. The position can be "in", "on" or "by". The direction can be static (no movement), movement towards or movement away. Combining these gives 9 different options.

	Interior	Surface	Adjacency
Static position	-ban/-ben in lakásban in the flat/apartment	-on/-en/-ön/-n on lakáson on the flat/apartment	-nál/-nél by, at lakásnál by/at the flat/apartment
Movement towards	-ba/-be into lakásba into the flat/apartment	-ra/-re onto lakásra onto the flat/apartment	-hoz/-hez/-höz to lakáshoz to the flat/apartment
Movement away	-ból/-ből out of lakásból out of the flat/apartment	-ról/-ről off lakásról off the flat/apartment	-tól/-től from lakástól from the flat/apartment

Note 1: -nál/-nél is also used with the meaning "at the home of" (cf. French chez, German bei).

Note 2: -ban/-ben is sometimes pronounced without the final n, this however, carries a connotation of rural or unsophisticated speech.

=== Town/city names ===
For town/city names, the rules for selecting the right group are as follows:

1. Towns outside the historical Kingdom of Hungary (i.e., towns that don't have a native Hungarian name) use the -ban/-ben group
2. Most towns within Hungary use the -on/-en/-ön/-n group
3. Approx. fifty towns within Hungary use the -ban/-ben group
  - This group includes all town names ending in -n, -ny and -város ("city/town"), most with -m, -i and some with -r. For example, Sopronban, Debrecenben; Gárdonyban; Dunaújvárosban; Esztergomban, Komáromban, Veszprémben; Zamárdiban; Egerben, Győrben

A few towns within Hungary traditionally use a different ending, -ott/-ett/-ött/-t, for position, see locative case for examples. This locative, however, always can be replaced by one of the above suffixes. Those towns that can also use the -on/-en/-ön/-n group (e.g. Pécsett or Pécsen) use -ra/-re and -ról/-ről for movement. Győr, however, where the alternative form is with -ban/-ben, uses -ba/-be and -ból/-ből for movement.

=== Differentiating place names with suffix groups ===
The difference of the two suffix group may carry a difference in meaning:

"Interior" cases: inessive, illative, elative (in, into, out of)	"Surface" cases: superessive, sublative, delative (on, onto, off)
towns/cities in other countries than Hungary; certain towns/cities in Hungary; counties, provinces; countries	most towns/cities in Hungary; islands

The below cases may exemplify the above tendencies but in actual usage they are not always followed as strictly as described:

- Tajvanon means "on (the island of) Taiwan" but Tajvanban is "in (the country of) Taiwan" (here the usage is parallel to English) – Note: Tajvanon may also refer to the country
- Tolnán means "in (the town of) Tolna" but Tolnában is "in the county of Tolna" – Note: Tolnában may also refer to the town
- Velencén means "in the Hungarian town of Velence" but Velencében is "in the Italian city of Venice (in Hungarian: Velence)" – Note: Velencében may also refer to the Hungarian town

==== Insider and outsider usage ====
There may also be difference between "insider" and "outsider" usage: one may prefer the suffixes expressing the "interior" relation and the others those expressing the "surface" relation (the difference extends to the suffixes of static position and those of the two kinds of movement).

In some cases, the local usage is encouraged based on traditional usage in literature and linguistic history, e.g. Csíkszeredában (instead of Csíkszeredán) as well as Nagyszombatban (instead of Nagyszombaton, which coincides with the form "on Holy Saturday"). In other cases, the "outsider" usage is considered more received or even normative, for example:

General/ outsider usage	Sátoraljaújhelyen (surface)	Balmazújvárosból (interior)
Insider usage	Sátoraljaújhelyben (interior)	Balmazújvárosról (surface)

== Cases and other noun suffixes ==
=== A note on terminology ===
The concept of grammatical cases was first used in the description of Ancient Greek and Latin grammar, which are fusional languages. Over the centuries the terminology was also used to describe other languages, with very different grammatical structures from Indo-European languages. Some linguists believe that the concept does not fit agglutinative languages very well. Rather than using the "case" paradigm and terminology for describing Hungarian grammar, they prefer to use the terms "(case) suffixes" and "endings". Despite these opinions, nowadays the term "case" is used by most Hungarian linguists.

The criterion for an ending to be a case (according to today's generative linguistic grammars of Hungarian) is that a word with that ending can be a compulsory argument of a verb. This difference is usually unimportant for average learners of the language.

However, it is useful to know that only actual cases can follow other suffixes of the word (such as the plural or the possessive suffix) and the other noun endings can only be added to absolute stems. For example, lakás-om-mal exists ("with my flat/apartment"), but *lakás-om-ostul doesn't.

=== Case endings ===
lakás - apartment
Suffix	Meaning	Example	Meaning of the example	Case name
∅	subject	lakás	apartment (as a subject)	Nominative case
-ot/(-at)/-et/-öt/-t	direct object	lakást	apartment (as an object)	Accusative case
-nak/-nek	indirect object	lakásnak	to the apartment	Dative case
-val/-vel (Assim.)	with	lakással	with the apartment	Instrumental-comitative case
-ért	for, for the purpose of	lakásért	for the apartment	Causal-final case
-vá/-vé (Assim.)	into	lakássá	[turn] into an apartment	Translative case
-ig	as far as, up to	lakásig	as far as the apartment	Terminative case
-ként	as, in the capacity of	lakásként	in the capacity of an apartment, as an apartment	Essive-formal case
-ul/-ül	by way of	lakásul	by way of an apartment	Essive-modal case
-ban/-ben	in	lakásban	in the apartment	Inessive case
-on/-en/-ön/-n	on	lakáson	on the apartment	Superessive case
-nál/-nél	by, at	lakásnál	by/at the apartment	Adessive case
-ba/-be	into	lakásba	into the apartment	Illative case
-ra/-re	onto	lakásra	onto the apartment	Sublative case
-hoz/-hez/-höz	towards	lakáshoz	towards the apartment	Allative case
-ból/-ből	out of	lakásból	out of the apartment	Elative case
-ról/-ről	off, about, concerning	lakásról	off the apartment about/concerning the apartment	Delative case
-tól/-től	from, away from	lakástól	(away) from the apartment	Ablative case

Assimilation works with -val/-vel and -vá/-vé: the initial sound of these suffixes will change to the preceding sound, if it is a consonant other than v, e.g. lakás + -val appears as lakással. (In words ending in a vowel or v, there is no change, e.g. sáv·val "with the lane", hajó·val "with the ship".)

=== Accusative suffix ===
After -l, -r, -j, -ly, -n, -ny, -s, -sz, -z and -zs, the accusative suffix is usually added directly to the noun rather than using a link vowel, e.g. lakást. For the other consonants, a link vowel is used.

-l, -r, -j, -ly, -n, -ny, -s, -sz, -z, -zs	asztalt, embert, bajt, súlyt, telefont, lányt, lakást, buszt, pénzt, rizst etc.
Other consonants (-b, -c, -cs, -d, -dz, -dzs, -f, -g, -gy, -h, -k, -m, -p, -t, -ty, -v)	darabot, lábat, ebet, köböt padot, holdat, ebédet, ködöt etc.

==== The accusative suffix after other suffixes ====
As shown in the above chart, -ot/(-at)/-et/-öt/-t is the accusative suffix for nouns with no other suffix. However, if the accusative suffix is added to a relative stem, that is, to a noun which already has another suffix (i.e. a plural or possessive suffix), -at/-et is used. Examples:

	Absolute stem with accusative	Relative stem with accusative
Back	ablakot ("window")	ablakomat ("my window") ablakokat ("windows") ablakaimat ("my windows")
Front (rounded)	gyümölcsöt ("fruit")	gyümölcsömet ("my fruit") gyümölcsöket ("fruits") gyümölcseimet ("my fruits")

Sometimes the quality of the link vowel of the accusative can differentiate between otherwise homonymous words:

Homonymous word in the nominative	The word as an absolute stem with accusative	The word as a relative stem with accusative
fánk	fánkot ("doughnut"): fánk ("doughnut") + -ot (acc.)	fánkat ("our tree"): fa ("tree") + -nk ("our") + -at (acc.)
sütőtök	sütőtököt ("pumpkin"): sütőtök ("pumpkin") + -öt (acc.)	sütőtöket ("your/pl. oven"): sütő ("oven") + -tök (your/pl.) + -et (acc.)

==== Accusative without marking ====
The accusative can be expressed without the -t morpheme after the first and second person possessive suffixes (especially in the singular). For example:

- Látom a kalapod∅. or Látom a kalapodat. "I [can] see your hat."
- Látod a kalapom∅. or Látod a kalapomat. "You [can] see my hat."

The accusative personal pronouns engem ("me") and téged ("you") are also used without the -t suffix (engemet and tégedet are rather infrequent).

The third case where the accusative remains unmarked is the infinitive, e.g. Szeretek kirándulni ("I like hiking", lit. "I like to hike"). (When the same meaning is expressed with a derived noun, the accusative -t appears: Szeretem a kirándulást.)

==== Apparent accusative endings and homonymy ====
The letter t also occurs at the end of certain words which thus may appear accusative. Examples include eset ("case"), falat ("a bit of food"), hét ("week"), kabát ("coat"), kert ("garden"), kötet ("volume" [of books]), lakat ("padlock"), lapát ("shovel"), part ("shore", "bank", "coast"), párt ("party"), sajt ("cheese") etc.

Telling them apart:

Ending	Function	Examples	Notes
-et	part of the stem	füzet "exercise book" (nom.)	If it occurs after a word with ö or ü in it, it is more likely to be part of the stem because such words usually take ö as linking vowel before the -t, e.g. köd+öt, öt+öt. (Exceptions include föld+et, könyv+et, tüz+et and fül+et.) So kötet is more likely to be a word on its own than a suffixed form of the hypothetical noun stem *köt (because its accusative would be probably *köt+öt).
-et	accusative suffix	hegy+et "mountain" (acc.)	If it occurs after a word with ö or ü in it, it is more likely to be part of the stem because such words usually take ö as linking vowel before the -t, e.g. köd+öt, öt+öt. (Exceptions include föld+et, könyv+et, tüz+et and fül+et.) So kötet is more likely to be a word on its own than a suffixed form of the hypothetical noun stem *köt (because its accusative would be probably *köt+öt).
-et	Homonyms: szelet "slice" (nom.) vs. szél+et (shortening the base) "wind" (acc.)		
-at	part of the stem	lakat "padlock", bocsánat "pardon"	
-at	traditional accusative suffix	ágy+at "bed" (acc.), haj+at "hair" (acc.), háj+at "fat" (acc.), vaj+at "butter" (acc.)	in the case of a handful of words
-at	Homonyms: állat "animal" (nom.) vs. áll+at "chin" (acc.), falat "a bit of food" (nom.) vs. fal+at "wall" (acc.), fogat "team of horses" (nom.) vs. fog+at "tooth" (acc.)		
Consonant + t	part of the stem	sajt "cheese" (nom.)	
Consonant + t	accusative suffix	baj+t "trouble" (acc.), faj+t "species" (acc.), zaj+t "noise" (acc.)	
Consonant + t	Homonyms: párt "[political] party" (nom.) vs. pár+t "couple" or "pair" (acc.)		
-át, -ét	lengthened form of words ending in a or e	anya "mother" → anyá+t (acc.), mese "fairy tale" → mesé+t (acc.)	
-át, -ét	lengthening the a/e of the preceding possessive suffix	láb+a "his/her leg" → lábá+t (acc.), kez+e "his/her hand" → kezé+t (acc.)	
-át, -ét	part of the stem	lapát "shovel", pecsét "stamp"	
-át, -ét	Homonyms: Without a possessive suffix: apát may be "abbot" (nom.) or "father" (acc.).; With a possessive suffix: sörét may be "pellet" (nom.) or "his/her beer" (acc.); szemét may be "waste/garbage" (nom.) or "his/her eye[s]" (acc.); menyét may be "weasel" (nom.) or "his/her daughter-in-law" (acc.).		
-ót	accusative of a word ending in ó	takaró+t "blanket", metró+t "underground/subway"	
-ót	accusative of a word ending in o	allegro → allegró+t, Oslo → Osló+t	mostly foreign words in Hungarian
-ót	part of the stem	kompót "preserved fruit" spenót "spinach"	in the case of a handful of words
-ot	the accusative of a word ending in a consonant	rab+ot "prisoner", pad+ot "bench"	the most common case
-ot	the wrongly spelt accusative form of words ending in o	*allegrot, *Oslot (they should be written like above, with long final ó before t)	mostly foreign words in Hungarian
-ot	part of the stem	bot "stick", állapot "state" or "condition", gyapot "cotton"	these three words and their compounds

Homonymy may also arise between accusative nouns and verbs, e.g. választ may mean "answer" (n, acc.) or "s/he chooses/elects" and nevet may mean "name" (n, acc., from név) or "s/he laughs".

The accusative of terem ("room"/"hall") is termet (see vowel-dropping) instead of the regular teremet (which could come from tér with vowel-shortening, meaning "my square", acc.). On the other hand, teremt means "s/he creates". Termet is another homonymy as it may be another word in the nominative ("stature"). – This latter bunch of examples shows eloquently that knowing stem types and recognizing them are essential for interpreting a Hungarian word correctly.

=== Other noun endings ===
Suffix	Meaning	Example	Meaning of the example	"Case" name
∅ or -nak/-nek	of (morphologically identical with the nominative or the dative case)	lakás or lakásnak	of the flat/apartment	Genitive case
-képp(en)	as, by way of	lakásképp, lakásképpen	by way of a flat/apartment, as a flat/apartment	Formal case
-onként/(-anként)/-enként/-önként/-nként	per, by	lakásonként	per flat/apartment, by flat/apartment	Distributive case
-ostul/(-astul)/-estül/-östül/-stul/-stül, -ostól/(-astól)/-estől/-östől/-stól/-stől	together with (restricted in use)	lakásostul, lakásostól	together with the flat/apartment	Sociative case
-ott/(-att)/-ett/-ött/-t	in (only for some Hungarian town/city names)	(Győr)ött/(Pécs)ett	in Győr/in Pécs	Locative case
-onta/(-anta)/-ente/-önte	every xxx (only for time-related words)	(nap)onta	daily	Distributive-temporal case
-kor	at (only for time-related words)	(hat)kor	at six	Temporal case

Notes:

- For more examples of the endings, refer to the article List of grammatical cases.
- The special status of the genitive case can be illustrated with the following example: "the key of the flat/apartment" is a lakás kulcsa or a lakásnak a kulcsa (nominative or dative case). The case marking is on the possessed object rather than the possessor.

=== Incorrect classifications ===
The following endings are sometimes counted as cases, but are in fact derivational suffixes, see Adjectives and adverbs

Suffix	Meaning	Example	Meaning of the example	"Case" name
-an/-en/-n		(rövid)en	briefly	"Modal-essive case" #1
-lag/-leg		lakásilag	as far as a flat/apartment is concerned	"Modal-essive case" #2
-szor/-szer/-ször		(három)szor	three times	"Multiplicative case"

== Slight noun irregularities ==
=== a/e/o/ö lengthening before suffixes ===
Words ending in a, e, o or ö become lengthened before most suffixes:

Nominative	Suffixed forms								
alma "apple"	almát	almák*	almám*	almának	almával	almáért	almává	almáig	almául
alma "apple"	almában	almán	almánál	almába	almára	almához	almából	almáról	almától
körte "pear"	körtét	körték*	körtém*	körtének	körtével	körtéért	körtévé	körtéig	körtéül
körte "pear"	körtében	körtén	körténél	körtébe	körtére	körtéhez	körtéből	körtéről	körtétől
Oslo	Oslót	Oslók*	Oslóm*	Oslónak	Oslóval	Oslóért	Oslóvá	Oslóig	Oslóul
Oslo	Oslóban	Oslón	Oslónál	Oslóba	Oslóra	Oslóhoz	Oslóból	Oslóról	Oslótól
Malmö	Malmőt	Malmők*	Malmőm*	Malmőnek	Malmővel	Malmőért	Malmővé	Malmőig	Malmőül
Malmö	Malmőben	Malmőn	Malmőnél	Malmőbe	Malmőre	Malmőhöz	Malmőből	Malmőről	Malmőtől

The asterisk means that almák/körték (the plural) and almám/körtém (the possessive forms) can be suffixed further, e.g. almákat, almáknak etc., almámat, almádat, almáját etc., almáimat, almáidat, almáit etc., almámnak, almádnak, almájának etc.

Those cases with small letters can be formed, but they are not meaningful, unless figuratively (e. g. Oslók lit. means "Oslos", but naturally Oslo doesn't have plural, although the case technically can be formed; Oslóul means "as an Oslo", which is also dubious).

The suffix -ként is an exception as it doesn't lengthen the a/e, e.g. almaként, körteként. Compounds don't lengthen the vowel, either, e.g. almalé, körtelé ("apple/pear juice").

Otherwise, this rule extends to all nouns and adjectives, e.g. Coca-Cola → Coca-Colát, Coca-Colának etc.

Short o and ö endings only occur with foreign words (like Oslo and Malmö above) since Hungarian or Hungarianized words lengthen these vowels at the end of the word, e.g. euró, metró, videó, sztereó, fotó, diszkó etc.

=== a link vowel ===
Certain back-vowel nouns, e.g. ház ("house"), always use the vowel a as a link vowel where the link vowel is usually -o/-e/-ö, except with the superessive case -on/-en/-ön/-n.

The link vowel -o/(-a)/-e/-ö occurs with the following suffixes:

- -ok/(-ak)/-ek/-ök/-k for noun plurals, e.g. házak ("houses")
- -om/(-am)/-em/-öm/-m for 1st singular possessive, e.g. házam ("my house")
- -od/(-ad)/-ed/-öd/-d for 2nd singular possessive, e.g. házad ("your (singular) house")
- -otok/(-atok)/-etek/-ötök/-tok/-tek/-tök for 2nd plural possessive, e.g. házatok ("your (plural) house")
- -ot/(-at)/-et/-öt/-t for accusative case, e.g. házat ("house")
- -onként/(-anként)/-enként/-önként/-nként, e.g. házanként ("per house")
- -ostul/(-astul)/-estül/-östül/-stul/-stül, e.g. házastul ("together with the house")
- -odik/(-adik)/-edik/-ödik for ordinal numbers, e.g. nyolcadik ("the eighth")
- -od/(-ad)/-ed/-öd for fractional numbers, e.g. nyolcad ("an eighth")
- -os/(-as)/-es/-ös for adjectival numbers, e.g. nyolcas ("number eight")
- -onta/(-ante)/-ente/-önte for distributive occasions, e.g. nyaranta ("every summer", from nyár "summer")

Theoretical:

- -ott/(-att)/-ett/-ött/-t for position

This irregularity sometimes help differentiate between otherwise homonymous verbs and nouns:

Homonymous word	Meaning as an a stem noun	áll	chin	fog	tooth	fal	wall	hal	fish	tár	storage/magazine	vár	castle	zár	lock
Homonymous word	Meaning as a normal verb	áll	he stands	fog	he catches	fal	he devours	hal	he dies	tár	he opens sth. up	vár	he waits	zár	he closes
Plural form of the a stem noun		állak	chins	fogak	teeth	falak	walls	halak	fish [pl.]	tárak	storages/magazines	várak	castles	zárak	locks
1st person singular of the verb		állok	I stand	fogok	I catch	falok	I devour	halok	I die	tárok	I open sth. up	várok	I wait	zárok	I close

The case of nyúl is similar ("rabbit" or "he reaches out") except that it becomes short in the plural as a noun (nyulak, cf. the hét type) and remains long as a verb (nyúlok). Beside árak (the plural of the a stem word ár, "price") árok also exists ("ditch"). Finally, beside vágyak ("desires"), vágyok may also occur as a verb ("I desire") although it is expressed as vágyom in standard Hungarian (cf. -ik verbs).

=== Oblique noun stem ===
Some nouns have an alternative stem which is used with certain suffixes. This is most commonly derived from the main stem by shortening or elision of the final vowel. A few nouns insert the letter "v" to derive the oblique stem.

It is used with the following suffixes:

Nominative base/stem (given for comparison)		hét ("week")	dolog ("thing")	tó ("lake")
Plural		hetek	dolgok	tavak
Possessive	1st person singular	hetem	dolgom	tavam
Possessive	2nd person singular	heted	dolgod	tavad
Possessive	3rd person singular	hete	dolga	tava
Possessive	1st person plural	hetünk	dolgunk	tavunk
Possessive	2nd person plural	hetetek	dolgotok	tavatok
Possessive	3rd person plural	hetük	dolguk	tavuk
Accusative		hetet	dolgot	tavat
Distributive		hetenként	dolgonként	tavanként
Sociative		hetestül	dolgostul	tavastul
Distributive-temporal		hetente	×	×
Superessive		(héten)	dolgon	tavon
Derived adjective		hetes	dolgos	tavas

Note: as with other nouns, the plural and the possessive forms (the first seven rows) are independent of cases so they can take the suffixes of other cases than the nominative: hetek|ből, dolgom|hoz, dolgaimhoz etc. The forms in the latter five rows (which have suffixes of certain cases) cannot have more suffixes attached.

=== Stem with -on/-en/-ön/-n ===
For -on/-en/-ön/-n, the vowel-shortening base uses the nominative stem, e.g. héten, but the other types (vowel-dropping and -v- bases) use the oblique stem, e.g. dolgon, tavon, as it is shown in the examples above.

Also, the back-vowel nouns which use an a link vowel have o as the link vowel instead, e.g. házon ("on the house").

As noted above, when it is added to tíz ("ten") and to húsz ("twenty") to form compound numbers, e.g. tizenegy ("eleven"), huszonegy ("twenty-one"), these vowel-shortening bases use the oblique stem.

=== Differentiating -an/-en from -on/-en/-ön/-n ===
The suffix -an/-en, used with numbers and adjectives, is not to be confused with the above suffix -on/-en/-ön/-n. Their vowel can only be a or e, even on words which would normally use o or ö: cf. ötön (on the number five) and öten (numbering five), haton and hatan (for the latter form, see Quantity expressions).

== Order of noun suffixes ==
Where more than one type of noun suffix occurs, the plural suffix is first (normally -k but -i with possessives). The possessive suffix follows this and the case suffix is last.

== Pronominal forms ==
=== Demonstrative pronouns ===
The demonstrative pronouns are ez ("this") and az ("that"). They can take the full range of case endings. For most suffixes, preservative consonant assimilation occurs.

=== Subject and object pronouns ===
Pronouns exist in subject (nominative) and object (accusative) forms.

Because the verb suffix is marked for both subject and object, the pronouns are not usually used, i.e. it is a pro-drop language. The pronouns are used for contrast or emphasis or when there is no verb.

		Singular		Plural	
		Subject	Object	Subject	Object
1st person		én	engem	mi	minket or bennünket
2nd person	(informal) (formal) (official)	te maga ön	téged magát önt	ti maguk önök	titeket or benneteket magukat önöket
3rd person		ő	őt	ők	őket

Hence, the English pronoun "you" can have no fewer than thirteen translations in Hungarian.

=== Cases with personal suffixes ===
For the other forms which are listed above as cases, the equivalent of a pronoun is formed using a stem derived from the suffix, followed by the personal suffix. For example, benned ("in you") or for emphasis tebenned ("in you") has the stem benn- which is derived from the front variant of the position suffix -ban/-ben ("in").

Note: When the stem ends in a long vowel, the 3rd person singular has a ∅ suffix.

maga and ön do not use these forms. They are conjugated like nouns with the case suffixes, e.g. magában, önben.

Suffixes that use a back vowel stem:

Suffix	Stem	-am/-m	-ad/-d	-a/-ja	-unk/-nk	-atok/-tok	-uk/-juk	Meaning
-NÁL/-nél	nál-	nálam	nálad	nála	nálunk	nálatok	náluk	by/at me etc.
-RÓL/-ről	ról-	rólam	rólad	róla	rólunk	rólatok	róluk	off me etc. about me etc.
-RA/-re	rá- (!)	rám	rád	**rá**	ránk	rátok	rájuk	onto me etc.
-HOZ/-hez/-höz	hozzá- (!)	hozzám	hozzád	**hozzá**	hozzánk	hozzátok	hozzájuk	to me etc.
-on/-en/-ön/-n	rajt- (!)	rajtam	rajtad	rajta	rajtunk	rajtatok	rajtuk	on me etc.

Suffixes that use a front vowel stem:

Suffix	Stem	-em/-m	-ed/-d	-e/-je	-ünk/-nk	-etek/-tek	-ük/-jük	Meaning
-val/-VEL	vel-	velem	veled	vele	velünk	veletek	velük	with me etc.
-tól/-TŐL	től-	tőlem	tőled	tőle	tőlünk	tőletek	tőlük	(away) from me etc.
-ÉRT	ért-	értem	érted	érte	értünk	értetek	értük	for me etc.
-nak/-NEK	nek-	nekem	neked	nek**i**	nekünk	nektek	nek**ik**	to me etc.
-ban/-BEN	benn- (!)	bennem	benned	benne	bennünk	bennetek	bennük	in me etc.
-ból/-BŐL	belől- (!)	belőlem	belőled	belőle	belőlünk	belőletek	belőlük	out of me etc.
-ba/-BE	belé- (!)	belém	beléd	**belé**	belénk	belétek	beléjük	into me etc.

No personal forms exist for the other suffixes: -vá/-vé, -ig, -ként, -ul/-ül, -képp(en), -stul/-stül, -onként/(-anként)/-enként/-önként/-nként, -ott/(-att)/-ett/-ött/-t, -onta/(-anta)/-ente/-önte, -kor. Their personal variants can be only paraphrases (e.g. addig ment, ahol ő állt "he went as far as him" > "… as far as where he stood").

=== Postpositions with personal suffixes ===
Most postpositions (see there) are combined with personal suffixes in a similar way, e.g. alattad ("under you").

Note: The personal forms of stand-alone postpositions are paraphrases, e.g. rajtam túl "beyond me", hozzám képest "as compared to me".

Personal suffixes at the end of postpositions:

-am/-em -m	-ad/-ed -d	-a/-e -ja/-je	-unk/-ünk -nk	-atok/-etek -tok/-tek	-uk/-ük -juk/-jük

See also the section Overview of personal endings: typical sound elements.

Note:

- In the same way as for the cases with personal suffixes, when the postposition (stem) ends in a long vowel, the 3rd person singular has a ∅ suffix (see the bolded forms in the last row).
- Postpositions in bare (unsuffixed) forms are capitalized.

==== Postpositions with three-way distinction ====
	...under/below me etc.	...over/above me etc.	...next to/beside me etc.	...in front of me etc.	...behind me etc.	...between me (& others) etc.	...around me etc.	...(from/to) my direction etc.
From...	ALÓL alólam alólad alóla alólunk alólatok alóluk	FÖLÜL fölülem fölüled fölüle fölülünk fölületek fölülük	MELLŐL mellőlem mellőled mellőle mellőlünk mellőletek mellőlük	ELŐL előlem előled előle előlünk előletek előlük	MÖGÜL mögülem mögüled mögüle mögülünk mögületek mögülük	KÖZÜL közülem közüled közüle közülünk közületek közülük	×	FELŐL felőlem felőled felőle felőlünk felőletek felőlük
(At/in...)	ALATT alattam alattad alatta alattunk alattatok alattuk	FÖLÖTT fölöttem fölötted fölötte fölöttünk fölöttetek fölöttük	MELLETT mellettem melletted mellette mellettünk mellettetek mellettük	ELŐTT előttem előtted előtte előttünk előttetek előttük	MÖGÖTT mögöttem mögötted mögötte mögöttünk mögöttetek mögöttük	KÖZÖTT or KÖZT közöttem or köztem közötted or közted közötte or közte közöttünk or köztünk közöttetek or köztetek közöttük or köztük	KÖRÜL (!) körül**ött**em körül**ött**ed körül**ött**e körül**ött**ünk körül**ött**etek körül**ött**ük	×
To...	ALÁ alám alád **alá** alánk alátok alájuk	FÖLÉ fölém föléd **fölé** fölénk fölétek föléjük	MELLÉ mellém melléd **mellé** mellénk mellétek melléjük	ELÉ elém eléd **elé** elénk elétek eléjük	MÖGÉ mögém mögéd **mögé** mögénk mögétek mögéjük	KÖZÉ közém közéd **közé** közénk közétek közéjük	KÖRÉ körém köréd **köré** körénk körétek köréjük	FELÉ felém feléd **felé** felénk felétek feléjük

==== Postpositions without three-way distinction ====
after me etc.	instead of me etc.	without me etc.	through/by me etc. (figurative)	against me etc.	because of me etc.	for my purpose etc.	"according to me", in my opinion etc.	towards me etc. (figurative)
UTÁN utánam utánad utána utánunk utánatok utánuk	HELYETT helyettem helyetted helyette helyettünk helyettetek helyettük	NÉLKÜL nélkülem nélküled nélküle nélkülünk nélkületek nélkülük	ÁLTAL általam általad általa általunk általatok általuk	ELLEN ellenem ellened ellene ellenünk ellenetek ellenük	MIATT miattam miattad miatta miattunk miattatok miattuk	VÉGETT (never used as a pronoun)	SZERINT szerintem szerinted szerinte szerintünk szerintetek szerintük	IRÁNT irántam irántad iránta irántunk irántatok irántuk

=== Derived postpositions with possessive suffixes ===
These below are declined like words with possessive suffixes plus cases:

for/to me etc.		by my help etc.		in my case etc.	on my part etc.
részemre részedre RÉSZÉRE részünkre részetekre részükre	számomra számodra SZÁMÁRA számunkra számotokra számukra	révemen réveden RÉVÉN révünkön réveteken révükön	segítségemmel segítségeddel SEGÍTSÉGÉVEL segítségünkkel segítségetekkel segítségükkel	esetemben esetedben ESETÉBEN esetünkben esetetekben esetükben	részemről részedről RÉSZÉRŐL részünkről részetekről részükről

Részére and számára are often interchangeable. To express sending or giving something (to someone), usually részére is preferred. On the other hand, to express the affected party of some perception or judgement (good, bad, new, shocking, unacceptable etc. for someone), only számára can be used, as well as when expressing goal, objective, intention, or other figurative purposes.

=== Placeholders in Hungarian ===
See Placeholder names in Hungarian

== Duplication with demonstrative determiners ==
When the noun has a plural suffix, a "case" suffix or a postposition, this is duplicated on the demonstrative. As with the demonstrative pronouns, for most suffixes, preservative consonant assimilation also occurs. Examples:

Basic form with definite article	With demonstrative determiner
a lakások ("the flats/apartments", subject)	ezek a lakások ("these flats/apartments", subject)
a lakást ("the flat/apartment", object)	ezt a lakást ("this flat/apartment", object)
a lakásban ("in the flat/apartment")	ebben a lakásban ("in this flat/apartment")
a lakással ("with the flat/apartment")	ezzel a lakással ("with this flat/apartment")
a lakás alatt ("under the flat/apartment")	ez alatt a lakás alatt ("under this flat/apartment")

As peripheral phenomena, there also exist non-duplicating forms, like e, ezen, eme, azon and ama (the latter two referring to distant objects), but they are poetic or obsolete (cf. "yonder"). For example: e házban = eme házban = ebben a házban ("in this house"). Ezen and azon are used before vowel-initial words, e.g. ezen emberek = ezek az emberek ("these people"). The duplicating forms (as in the chart above) are far more widespread than these.
