= Gyula Szepesy =

Hungarian linguist

Gyula Szepesy (Dömsöd, Hungary, 1913 – Budapest, January 2001) was a Hungarian linguist.

== Life ==
He spoke ca. 20 languages fluently. He studied not only spoken languages such as German, Finnish, Swedish, Russian but classical languages Latin and Old Greek, too. He translated Horace's Best Odes and Ammianus Marcellinus' The Roman History (Rerum Gestarum Libri) from Latin into Hungarian. He had a comprehensive knowledge of the Finno-Ugric languages, and he used this knowledge in his doctoral dissertation about the Hungarian possessive constructions such as isten-adta /god-given/ in Finno-Ugric languages in 1939. This work is the most detailed source of description of the prenominal relative clauses in Finno-Ugric languages, though he considered and analyzed this constructions as possessive constructions. He fought against the linguistic superstitions in Hungarian.

== Selected works ==
- Szepesy, Gyula: Az isten-adta-féle szerkezetek a finnugor nyelvekben (The Hungarian possessive constructions such as isten-adta /god-given/ in Finno-Ugric languages), Doctoral Dissertation, A Magyar Nyelvtudományi Társaság Kiadványai 47. (Issues of Hungarian Linguistic Society), Budapest, 1939 (Hasonmás Kiadás (Reprint issue), Budapest, 1978)
- Szepesy, Gyula: Isten-adta, madár-látta (The Hungarian possessive constructions such as isten-adta /god-given/, madár-látta /bird-seen/, Magyar Nyelv 78 (the Periodical Hungarian Language), 1982, 52–67.
- Szepesy, Gyula: Nyelvi babonák (Linguistic superstitions in Hungarian), Budapest, Gondolat, 1986 URL: See External Links

== Bibliography ==
- A. Jászó, Anna: Szepesy Gyula (1913–2001), Magyar Nyelv 97 (the Periodical Hungarian Language), 2001, 370–371 URL: See External Links
