= Distributive =

Distributive may refer to:

- Distributive property, in algebra, logic and mathematics
- Distributive pronoun and distributive adjective (determiner), in linguistics
- Distributive case, in linguistics
- Distributive numeral, in linguistics
