= Distributive-temporal case =

Grammatical case specifying the time and manner of an event

The distributive-temporal of a noun is a grammatical case specifying when and how often something is done.

== In Hungarian ==
This case (-nta/-nte) in Hungarian can express how often something happens (e.g. havonta "monthly", naponta "daily", telente "every winter", reggelente "every morning"); it can alternate with the distributive case in words of temporal meaning.

== In Finnish ==
This adverb type in Finnish can express that something happens at a frequent point in time (e.g. "on Sundays" is sunnuntaisin), or an origin (e.g. "born in" is syntyisin). It is restricted to a small number of adverb stems and nouns, mostly those with the plural formed with an -i- suffix. The ending is -sin. For example, the root päivä (day) has the plural päivi-, and thus the temporal distributive päivisin ("during the days").

The temporal distributive case specifies when something is done, in contrast to the distributive case, which specifies how often something is done, as in regular maintenance. These sentences are a good example: Siivoan päivisin vs. Siivoan päivittäin. The former (temp. dist.) means "I clean by day", implying the cleaning is done in the daytime, whereas the latter (dist.) means "I clean daily", implying that there's no day without cleaning.

If the plural has another form than -i-, either joka (each) or the essive case is used. For example, uusi vuosi (New Year) is either joka uusi vuosi or uusina vuosina, respectively.
