= Hungarian grammar =

Grammar of the Hungarian language

Hungarian grammar is the grammar of Hungarian, a Ugric language that is spoken mainly in Hungary and in parts of its seven neighboring countries.

Hungarian is a highly agglutinative language which uses various affixes, mainly suffixes, to change the meaning of words and their grammatical function. These affixes are mostly attached according to vowel harmony.

Verbs are conjugated according to definiteness, tense, mood, person and number. Nouns can be declined with 18 case suffixes, most of which correspond to English prepositions.

Hungarian is a pro-drop language and the subject does not have to be explicitly stated.

Hungarian is a topic-prominent language and so its word order depends on the topic-comment structure of the sentence (that is, what aspect is assumed to be known and what is emphasized).

== Word order ==
Neutral Hungarian sentences have a subject–object–verb word order, for example Péter almát eszik (Peter eats an apple). Word order is determined not by syntactic roles but rather by pragmatic factors. Emphasis is placed on the word or phrase immediately before the finite verb.

The four parts that a sentence usually contains are topic, focus, verb and the rest; however, any of the four parts may be empty. The topic and the rest may contain any number of phrases, but the focus may contain only one phrase.

=== Emphasis ===
The tables below contain some Hungarian variations of the sentence János tegnap elvitt két könyvet Péternek. ("John took two books to Peter yesterday.") Besides the verb, the sentence contains four other elements: János ("John"), Péternek ("to Peter"), két könyvet ("two books") and tegnap ("yesterday").

Topics		Focus	Verb	The rest	Special meaning
János	tegnap	∅	elvitt	két könyvet Péternek.	Two books were taken by John to Peter yesterday. (It was successfully completed, and there is no special emphasis.)
János	tegnap	két könyvet	vitt el	Péternek.	It was two books that John took to Peter yesterday. (As far as John and yesterday are concerned, it was exactly two books that he took to Peter.)
János	∅	tegnap	vitt el	két könyvet Péternek.	It was yesterday that John took two books to Peter. (John took Peter two books sometime, but it was done specifically yesterday.)
∅	∅	János	vitt el	tegnap két könyvet Péternek.	It was John who took two books to Peter.
∅	∅	Péternek	vitt el	tegnap János két könyvet.	It was to Peter whom John took two books to yesterday.
János	tegnap	Péternek	vitt el	két könyvet.	John took two books yesterday specifically to Peter, not to anybody else.
∅	∅	∅	Elvitt	János tegnap két könyvet Péternek.	Two books were taken by John to Peter yesterday. (The action was completed, and the books are at Peter's place now. Emphasis on the action.)
Két könyvet	tegnap	∅	elvitt	János Péternek.	Two books were indeed taken by John to Peter. (Perhaps something else was brought to him, as well. However, the two books may not be the most important thing; for example, John may have left Peter's documents at home.)
∅	∅	Két könyvet	vitt el	János tegnap Péternek.	John took two books and nothing else to Peter yesterday.

The topic contains a phrase or phrases that the speaker considers to be known and are used to introduce the topic of the statement, equivalent to "as far as X is concerned,...". The focus attracts the attention to an element of the event that is considered to be unknown, or it may be a refutation to a possible opposing belief. It excludes the validity of the statement for all other individuals in question and is equivalent to "it was X and nothing else that...".

If a focus is present, the verbal prefix will be put after the verb (vitt el is used instead of elvitt). If there is no verbal prefix, there may be ambiguity in writing since the phrase before the verb may be either a topic or a focus. For example, in the sentence Éva szereti a virágokat ("Eve likes [the] flowers"), Éva may be a topic and the sentence may be neutral, or Éva may be a focus and the sentence may emphasize that it is Eve who likes flowers:

Sentence	Interpretation
Éva szereti a virágokat.	Eve likes flowers.
Szereti Éva a virágokat.	Eve likes flowers (despite what someone thinks).
Éva szereti a virágokat.	Eve likes flowers (and not someone else).
Éva a virágokat szereti.	Eve likes flowers (and not something else).
A virágokat Éva szereti.	It is Eve who likes flowers (and not someone else although something else may be liked by someone else).
A virágokat szereti Éva.	It is flowers that Eve likes (and not something else).

== Morphology ==
Hungarian is an agglutinative language. Most grammatical information is given through suffixes: "on the table" = asztalon (space relation), "at 5 o'clock" = öt órakor (time relation). There is also one grammatical prefix (leg- for superlatives).

=== Overview of personal endings: typical sound elements ===
In Hungarian, the endings are common mostly for endings of pronouns with suffixes and postpositions, possessive endings of nouns and endings of verbs. (The accusative of pronouns is also given for comparison, but it is less regular.)

Pronoun		Case/postposition stem		Noun	Verb		Typical element
Nominative	Accusative	+ personal suffix	+ personal suffix	+ possessive suffix	Indefinite present	Definite present	Typical element
"I" etc.	"me" etc.	"by/at me" etc.	"under me" etc.	"my flat /apartment" etc.	"I see" etc.	"I see it" etc.	Typical element
én	engem	nálam	alattam	lakásom	látok	látom	-m with link vowel -o/(-a)/-e/-ö or -a/-e
te	téged	nálad	alattad	lakásod	látsz	látod	-d with link vowel -o/(-a)/-e/-ö or -a/-e
ő	őt	nála	alatta	lakása	lát	látja	-a/-e
mi	minket	nálunk	alattunk	lakásunk	látunk	látjuk	-nk with link vowel -u/-ü
ti	titeket	nálatok	alattatok	lakásotok	láttok	látjátok	-tok/-tek/-tök
ők	őket	náluk	alattuk	lakásuk	látnak	látják	-k
"You" (formal)	(When to use which form: "Maga" when a higher ranking person speaks to a lower ranking person with formality. (ex.: boss to employee) "Ön" when a lower ranking person speaks to a higher ranking person with formality. (ex.: employee to boss) When speaking to the elderly the "Ön form" is used (as the "Maga form" can have pejorative undertones.)						
Ön, Maga	Önt; Magát	Önnél; Magánál	Ön alatt Maga alatt	az Ön lakása a Maga lakása	Ön lát Maga lát	Ön látja Maga látja	(-a/-e)
Önök, Maguk	Önöket; Magukat	Önöknél; Maguknál	Önök alatt Maguk alatt	az Önök lakása a Maguk lakása	Önök látnak Maguk látnak	Önök látják Maguk látják	(-k)

=== Harmonic vowels in suffixes ===
Front-back vowel harmony is important in Hungarian morphophonology. Certain suffixes also distinguish between front unrounded vowels and front rounded vowels. See Hungarian phonology or vowel harmony for a more detailed explanation.

Most (if not all) morphological word endings in Hungarian for verb conjugations (definite and indefinite), possessive suffixes and 'case-related' postpositions can be thought of as 'templates' that are, in turn, 'filled in' with vowels. While the template itself consists mainly of consonants (and sometimes vowels), the vowels that 'fill in' the template depend on the class of vowels (front, back, long, short, rounded, unrounded) in the word to which the template is attached.

For example, 'bVn' would be the template for the postposition meaning 'in' (with 'V' being the 'fill-in' vowel position) and it can be 'filled in' with either 'a' (for back vowels), thus forming 'ban,' or with 'e' (for front vowels), thus forming 'ben'. On the other hand, 'hVz' would be the template for the postposition meaning 'to' and this can be 'filled in' with 'o' (back), 'e' (front unrounded), or 'ö' (front rounded). The particular vowel or vowels taken by a template must mostly be memorized by a learner of Hungarian, but certain patterns can be noted by observing the particular phonological makeup of the consonants in the template. For example, 'vVl' is the template meaning 'with,' but the first consonant ('v') changes to match the final consonant of the word to which it is attached (provided the word ends in a consonant).

Note that the stem-final a and e, as well as o and ö in foreign words, are lengthened before suffixes: alma → almát, mese → mesét, pianó → pianót, Malmö → Malmőt. (Short o and ö cannot occur at the end of Hungarian words.) Short i, u and ü retain their length: ami → amit, kapu → kaput, menü → menüt.

Here are the vowels that form parallel pairs or triads in harmonic suffixes:

Back	Front
variant
o	e/ö
a	e
á	é
u	ü
ú	ű
ó	ő

It can be seen the members of these pairs/triads agree mostly in height and length but differ in backness. (An exception is the pair á/é for which á (open front unrounded vowel) is considered to be back.)

In the cases of o vs. e and ö and of a and e there appears a difference in roundedness, too.

Notes:

- e is used in two of the groups. There are no suffixes that have a/e/ö, and o/e (without ö) is very rare and is used only for certain second-person plural suffixes.
- Whenever i is used in a suffix, it is usually an invariant suffix. It also occurs once as a front verb suffix (paired with -ja) and in the irregular forms neki and nekik (see Cases with personal suffixes).

=== Suffix typology ===
The suffixes can be classified into the following phonological types:

1. Initial consonant and no change depending on the stem ending: -ban/-ben, -hoz/-hez/-höz
2. Initial v with complete preservative consonant assimilation, only for -val/-vel and -vá/-vé
3. Initial vowel and no change depending on the stem ending: -ul/-ül, -ás/-és
4. Link vowel o/e/ö on stems ending with a consonant, with link vowel a for certain back-vowel noun stems, e.g. -om/(-am)/-em/-öm/-m
5. Link vowel a/e on stems ending with a consonant: -ak/-ek/-k
6. Link vowel u/ü on stems ending with a consonant: -unk/-ünk/-nk
7. Link consonant -j on stems ending with a vowel and on certain stems ending with a consonant, only for -a/-e/-ja/-je and -uk/-ük/-juk/-jük
8. Invariant: -kor, -ig

Minor variations:

- -on/-en/-ön/-n does not use the a link vowel for any nouns
- The accusative suffix, -ot/(-at)/-et/-öt/-t, does not use a link vowel for stems ending with certain consonants

Note that the long vowels á/é, ú/ű and ó/ő are not used as link vowels.

=== Citation form of suffixes ===
- If the list of suffixes has only one invariant form, it is used on all stems: -ig.
- If the list of suffixes has two forms, the former is the form for back vowel stems and the latter is the form for front vowel stems: -ban/-ben: -ban is used for lakás and -ben is used for szem and fürdő.
- If the list of suffixes has three forms with the vowels o/e/ö, the o form is used for back vowel stems, the e form is used for front unrounded stems and the ö form is used for front rounded stems: -hoz/-hez/-höz: -hoz is used for lakás, -hez is used for szem and -höz is used for fürdő.
- If the list of suffixes has forms that start with a vowel that are followed by one or more forms that start with a consonant, the forms that start with a vowel are used on consonant-final stems, and the forms which start with a consonant are used on vowel-final stems (the initial vowel of the suffix is called a link vowel, and the rules to select the form in the vowel or consonant group apply as above: -unk/-ünk/-nk: -unk is used on lakás, -ünk on szem and kör and -nk is used on fürdő.
- If the list of suffixes has four forms for consonant-final stems, with the link vowels o/(a)/e/ö, the a form is used with certain back noun stems: -om/(-am)/-em/-öm/-m: -om is used for lakás, -am is used for ház, -em is used for szem, -öm is used for kör and -m is used for fürdő.

Ending	Sample word	Suffix variation				
Ending	Sample word	Constant	Difference by vowel quality		Difference by vowel quality and ending	
Ending	Sample word	-ig	-ban/-ben	-hoz/-hez/-höz	-unk/-ünk/-nk	-om/-am/-em/-öm/-m
Consonant	lakás	lakásig házig szemig körig fürdőig	lakásban házban	lakáshoz házhoz	lakásunk házunk	lakásom
Consonant	ház	lakásig házig szemig körig fürdőig	lakásban házban	lakáshoz házhoz	lakásunk házunk	házam
Consonant	szem	lakásig házig szemig körig fürdőig	szemben körben fürdőben*	szemhez	szemünk körünk	szemem
Consonant	kör	lakásig házig szemig körig fürdőig	szemben körben fürdőben*	körhöz fürdőhöz*	szemünk körünk	köröm
Vowel	fürdő	lakásig házig szemig körig fürdőig	szemben körben fürdőben*	körhöz fürdőhöz*	fürdőnk	fürdőm

*: Its suffix may agree with any of the preceding variants, e.g. fürdőben but autóban, fürdőhöz but autóhoz and tévéhez.

=== Personal suffixes and link vowels ===
Personal suffixes can have various uses in Hungarian grammar. There are two sets of them:

- Type I uses the 'a/e' set of vowels as link vowels
- whereas Type II uses the o/e/ö set.

Therefore, their differences are:

- Type I has -a- as link vowel where Type II only uses -o in back-vowel words
- Type I doesn't use -ö- as link vowel with front-vowel words while Type II does.

	Type I (a/e)		Type II (o/e/ö)	
	Singular	Plural	Singular	Plural
1st person	-am/-em/ -m	-unk/-ünk/ -nk	-om/-em/-öm/ -m	-unk/-ünk/ -nk
2nd person (informal)	-ad/-ed/ -d	-atok/-etek/ -tok/-tek	-od/-ed/-öd/ -d	-otok/-etek/-ötök/ -tok/-tek/-tök
2nd person (formal or official) and 3rd person	-a/-e/ -ja/-je	-uk/-ük/ -juk/-jük	-a/-e/ -ja/-je	-uk/-ük/ -juk/-jük
	rólam, bennem, tőlem ("cases" attached to personal pronouns); alattam, felettem, mögöttem (postpositions attached to personal pronouns); vártam, kértem, köszöntem (verb suffixes in the past tense); várjak, kérjek, köszönjek (verb suffixes in the subjunctive); házam, mézem, földem (possessive suffixes on certain nouns that require low linking vowel); pirosam, szépem, zöldem (possessive suffixes on almost all adjectives)		ablakom, szemem, gyümölcsöm (possessive suffixes attached to nouns); várok, kérek, köszönök (verb suffixes in the present tense); várnom, kérnem, köszönnöm (suffixes attached to the infinitive)	

- In the example rows below the chart proper, the forms for the 1st person singular are given for the three basic types (back vowel, unrounded front vowel, rounded front vowel).
- Within cells, the first row is for stems ending in a consonant and the second for stems ending in a vowel.
- There is some variance with verbs (mostly in the 3rd person) but their forms still resemble this pattern.
- The házam, mézem, földem group has another special feature as well: they always use a link vowel in the accusative, independently of their endings (e.g. házat but gázt, mézet but gézt).

This difference often disambiguates meanings, e.g. jöttek means "they came" (past) and jöttök means "you [pl.] come" (present).

An extreme example is the longest Hungarian word 'megszentségteleníthetetlenségeskedéseitekért' (means 'due to your repeatedly not being possible to be desecrated'). This word contains a great many inflexions, prefix, suffix, etc. The core of the word is 'szent', meaning "sacred."

Note: the accusative suffix following the stem or following other suffixes shows the same difference, except for the six different forms for the six persons:

Type I (a/e)	Type II (o/e/ö)
ablakokat, szemeket, gyümölcsöket (accusative suffixes following other suffixes)	ablakot, szemet, gyümölcsöt (accusative suffixes attached to the stem)

== Noun phrase ==
See Hungarian noun phrase.

== Postpositions ==
As well as the noun suffixes, which are often equivalent to English prepositions, Hungarian also has postpositions.

=== Amalgamation with personal pronouns ===
If postpositions are used with personal pronouns (cf. "to me"), most of them amalgamate with the suffixes expressing the person. Compare:

Postposition	"Regular" postpositional use	"Amalgamated" use with personal suffixes
alatt under	az asztal alatt under the table	alattam under me

For the full list of such postpositions, see postpositions with personal suffixes.

=== Stand-alone postpositions ===
The following postpositions differ from the above in that they are never suffixed with personal endings:

Spatial postpositions	Time postpositions	Other postpositions
át "over/across"; keresztül "through/via"; túl "beyond"	óta "since"; hosszat "for xxx time"; múlva "in xxx time"; kezdve "from xxx on"; közben, során, folyamán "during"; körül, tájt, tájban, táján "around"	gyanánt "as, by way of"; végett "in order to, with a view to"; esetén "in case of"; folytán "due to"; képest "as compared to"; nézve "regarding, considering"

=== Derived postpositions ===
Certain standard postpositions are derived from a noun + 3rd person singular possessive suffix + case ending, e.g. apám révén "by the help of my father". See their list here.

This internal structure affects how they are used with pronominal forms (see above).

=== Case requirements ===
Most postpositions govern the nominative case; the exceptions are listed below. (The genitive case below means that morphologically speaking, they can take either the nominative or the dative suffix, see Other noun endings.)

dative	valami / valaminek	ellenére (despite), folyamán (during), jóvoltából (thanks to), kedvéért (for the sake of), következtében (due to), mentén (along), részére (for), révén (by/through/via), számára (for/to), útján (via)
superessive	valamin	alul (under/below), át (through/over), belül (inside), felül/fölül (over/above), innen (this way from X), keresztül (across), kezdve (from X on), kívül (outside/except), túl (beyond)
sublative	valamire	nézve (with respect to)
allative	valamihez	hasonlóan (similarly to), képest (as compared to)
adessive	valaminél	fogva_{1} (owing to)
ablative	valamitől	fogva_{2} (from X on), kezdve (from X on)
instrumental-comitative	valamivel	együtt (along with), szemben (opposite)

=== Postpositions functioning as prepositions ===
Some postpositions may also precede the noun, thus functioning as prepositions: át (over/across), keresztül (through), együtt (together with), szemben (opposite), túl (beyond), e.g. át a folyón or a folyón át ("across the river").

== Adjectives and adverbs ==
=== Adjective marking ===
Adjectives are unmarked for case. Attributive adjectives are unmarked for number but predicative adjectives are marked: piros almák ("red apples") but Az almák pirosak. ("The apples [are] red.").

=== Adverb derivation ===
The suffix -an/-en/-n is used to form adverbs of manner from adjectives. -l, -lag/-leg and -ul/-ül are also used to derive adverbs from some adjectives.

There is also a suffix, -va/-ve, which is used to derive adverbs from verbs. Its nearest English equivalent is the -ing form in a present participle (rather than a noun):

- Úszva jött ide. ("He came here swimming.")

When combined with a form of the existential verb (van), it expresses the result of an action:

- A vacsora el van készítve ("The dinner is prepared."), from the verb elkészít ("prepare").

Such participles (note the adverbial usage) are referred to by term "adverbial participle" (distinguished from adjectival participle).

=== Use of adverbs ===
In Hungarian adverbs can be used predicatively with van ("is"): Korán van. ("It's early.") Nyitva van. ("It's open.")

=== Degree adverbs ===
Some degree adverbs are formed from adjectives. The suffixes are the same ones that are usually used on nouns:

- -on/-en/-ön/-n, e.g. nagyon ("very")
- -vá/-vé, e.g. kissé ("somewhat, to some extent"), eléggé ("quite, fairly")

=== Comparative and superlative ===
Comparative adjectives and adverbs are formed by adding -abb/-ebb/-bb to the adjective stem: gyors ("quick"), gyorsabb ("quicker"), gyorsan ("quickly"), gyorsabban ("more quickly").

To state the thing that is being compared with (like English "than"), Hungarian uses the noun suffix -nál/-nél or the preposition mint (mint is the only preposition in Hungarian): gyorsabb a szélnél or gyorsabb, mint a szél ("faster than the wind").

Superlative adjectives and adverbs are formed by adding the prefix leg- to the comparative: a leggyorsabb ("the quickest"), a leggyorsabban ("the most quickly").

Example: magas ("tall/high")
Degree	Word elements			Complete form	Meaning
Degree	Prefix	Adjective stem	Suffix	Complete form	Meaning
Base	–	magas	–	magas	tall/high
Comparative	–	magas	-abb	magasabb	taller/higher
Superlative	leg-	magas	-abb	legmagasabb	tallest/highest
Exaggerated	legesleg-	magas	-abb	legeslegmagasabb	the very tallest/highest

Notes:

1. Back-vowel adjectives use a as link vowel (as in magasabb), while front-vowel ones use e (e.g. hidegebb "colder"). The only exception is nagy ("big"), which uses o as link vowel instead of a: nagyobb, legnagyobb, legeslegnagyobb.
2. The exaggerated measure is used to stress the superlative adjective.

== Verbs ==
See Hungarian verbs

== Expressing time ==
Many expressions of time use the case endings and postpositions which are also used for position, e.g.:

- -tól/-től – when from
- -ig – until when
- -ra/-re – by (before) a certain time
- között (postposition) – between; among
- előtt (postposition) – before
- után (postposition) – after
- -n belül (postposition with suffix) – within

There are also some which are used only for time, e.g.:

- -kor – at what time, e.g. kilenckor ("at nine"), karácsonykor ("at Christmas")
- -onta/-ente/-önte – every ..., e.g. naponta ("daily")
- múlva (postposition) – in ... time, e.g. 2 hét múlva ("in 2 weeks' time")

There are 2 ways of expressing how long ago something happened:

- 3rd singular possessive suffix with past tense, e.g. 10 éve költözött el. ("He moved away 10 years ago.")
- -val/-vel + ezelőtt with past tense, e.g. 10 évvel ezelőtt költözött el. ("He moved away 10 years ago.")

=== Telling the time ===
"Hány óra (van)? Mennyi (most) az idő?" ("What time is it? What is the time?")

- 8.20 – Nyolc óra múlt húsz perccel. "It is twenty (minutes) past eight."
- 8.50 – Tíz perc múlva kilenc óra. "It is ten to nine."

Times can be given by just the numbers, but this is not usual in speech, e.g.:

nyolc óra húsz (literally "eight hour twenty") or nyolc húsz (literally "eight twenty").

In speech the half and quarter hours are expressed by what fraction of the time to the next hour has elapsed.

These can be written using fractions, e.g.:

- 8.00 or 8 – nyolc (literally "eight") or nyolc óra ( literally "eight hours")
- 8.15 or 1/4 9 – negyed kilenc (literally "quarter nine")
- 8.30 or 1/2 9 – fél kilenc (literally "half nine")
- 8.45 or 3/4 9 – háromnegyed kilenc (literally "three-quarters nine")

These are abbreviated in movie programmes as n9, f9 and h9 (with the initial letters of the fraction names).

The times in between these are expressed in relation to the next or previous quarter hour, e.g.:

- 8.20 – negyed kilenc múlt öt perccel (literally "past quarter 9 by 5 minutes")...

...or fél kilenc lesz tíz perc múlva (literally "it will be half 9 in 10 minutes' time")

- 8.25 – fél kilenc lesz öt perc múlva (literally "it will be half 9 in 5 minutes' time")

These are different when they refer to a time in the past or future:

- 8.20-kor – negyed kilenc után öt perccel (literally "after quarter 9 by 5 minutes")
- 8.25-kor – fél kilenc előtt öt perccel (literally "before half 9 by 5 minutes")

=== Duration structures ===
For a period of time extending up to the present:

- 3rd singular possessive ending with present tense, e.g. 3 éve lakom itt. ("I've been living here for 3 years.")
- 3rd singular possessive ending with negative past tense, e.g. 10 éve nem láttam. ("I haven't seen him for 10 years.")

For a period of time in the past, present or future:

- accusative with dynamic verbs, e.g. 2 órát segítünk. ("We're helping for 2 hours."), 2 órát fogunk segíteni ("We're going to help for 2 hours."), 2 órát segítettünk. ("We helped for 2 hours.")
- -ig with stative verbs, e.g. 5 évig laktam Londonban. ("I lived in London for 5 years."), Egy percig sem maradok itt! ("I won't stay here even for a minute!")

These two structures are often interchangeable.

- The -ra/-re structure also exists, but it's rarely used in this sense since it may be ambiguous with the "by (before)" meaning. For example, Három napra ment el. ("He left for three days.") Then again: Három napot/napig volt távol. ("He was away for three days.") – the above suffixes appear.

== Negation ==
Verbs are negated with nem except in the subjunctive, when ne is used.

Double or multiple negative is mandatory with negative pronouns (like nobody, nothing, never, nowhere).

== Questions ==
=== Question words ===
Ki? is the basic question word for a person ("who?"), and mi? is the basic question word for a thing ("what?"). If it is meaningful, they can take the full range of case and noun suffixes: kit?, miben?, miképp? mi + ért ("for the purpose of") gives the question word miért? ("why?").

Milyen? is used to ask for a description and can be used either to ask about a whole noun phrase (Milyen a tanárod? "What is your teacher like?") or as a determiner (Milyen lakást akarsz? "What kind of flat do you want?"). There is no case suffix -lyan/-lyen, but that ending still occurs in ilyen ("this kind of"), olyan ("that kind of"), valamilyen ("some kind of") and semmilyen ("no kind of").

The strict three-way distinction in direction that occurs in the positional suffixes also occurs in the question words: hol? ("where?"), hova? /hová? ("where to?") and honnan? ("where from?").

Hány? is used to ask questions about numbers ("how many?"), and mennyi? is used to ask about quantities ("how much?"). If it is meaningful, they can take the full range of case and noun suffixes, and hánnyal?, hánykor?, mennyibe?, mennyiért? hány? can also take the full range of suffixes used for numbers and to express quantity: hányadik?, hányas?

=== Yes–no question ===
Yes–no questions are expressed by intonation and not by any modification to syntax or morphology.

A short positive answer to a yes–no question is often given by repeating the verb particle (or the full verb, if it has no particle), rather than by using the words Igen ("Yes"). Examples:

- Elment? – El. ("Has he left? – He has." Literally "[He] away-went? – Away.")
- Látta a filmet? – Látta. ("Did he see the film? – He did." Literally "[He] saw the film? – [He] saw.").

A negative answer to a yes–no question may include the word Nem ("No"), the negation of the requested part of the sentence or both.

- Elment?
- Nem. (this option may sound rude) / Nem ment el. / Nem, nem ment el. ("No, he hasn't left." Literally "No, not [He] went away.")

=== Tag questions ===
Tag questions are made by adding ugye to the beginning or end of a statement: Elment, ugye? or Ugye elment? ("He has left, hasn't he?"). The latter form more strongly suggests a positive answer.

== Subordinate and relative clauses ==
Subordinate clauses are often used with an antecedent in the main clause, e.g. Kabátot hozott, mert fázott. /Azért hozott kabátot, mert fázott. ("She fetched a coat because she was cold [not for some other reason].)

Relative clauses usually have an explicit antecedent in the main clause, e.g. Attól félek/tartok, (hogy) nem mehetek el. ("I'm afraid [of the fact that] I can't go.")
