= Hungarian verbs =

Verbs of the Hungarian language

This page is about verbs in Hungarian grammar.

== Lemma or citation form ==
There is basically only one pattern for verb endings, with predictable variations dependent on the phonological context.

The lemma or citation form is always the third person singular indefinite present. This usually has a ∅ suffix, e.g. kér ("ask", "have a request").

=== -ik verbs ===
A slight variation to the standard pattern is with certain verbs which have third person singular indefinite present ending with -ik, e.g. dolgozik ("s/he works"), and 1st singular indefinite present usually with -om/-em/-öm. The stem for this is reached by removing -ik. These verbs are one of the reasons why this form is the citation form.

The -ik verbs were originally middle voice, reflexive or passive in meaning, which can still be seen e.g. about the pair tör ("s/he breaks something") vs törik ("something breaks" / "something gets broken"). However, most of them have lost this connection (they can have active meanings) so historically speaking they are like deponent verbs. Some verb pairs only differ in the presence or absence of the -ik ending, while they are unrelated in meaning, such as ér ('be worth something' or 'arrive') and érik ('ripen').

With these verbs, the third person singular (present indefinite indicative) form (i.e., the lemma) consistently uses the -ik form. What is more, new -ik words continue to be created (e.g. netezik "use the Internet").

However, the first person singular (present indefinite indicative) suffix is often assimilated to the "normal" conjugation (as it has happened to the other -ik-specific forms), so most verbs usually take the regular form for this person (e.g. hazudok; *hazudom would be taken as hypercorrect or incorrect). Nevertheless, with some basic -ik verbs, the assimilated variant is stigmatized (e.g. eszem is expected in educated speech, rather than *eszek), so with these verbs, the traditional form is advised. At any rate, such non-traditional, assimilated variants are not rare in colloquial spoken language.

Since this (3rd person singular indefinite) -ik ending coincides with the -ik ending of the 3rd person plural definite form, only the type of the object makes it possible to identify the subject:

- eszik egy almát: egy almát "an apple" is indefinite, so the verb must be a singular form, i.e. "s/he is eating an apple;"
- eszik az almát: az almát "the apple" is definite, so the verb must be a plural form, i.e. "they are eating the apple."

In fact, most -ik verbs are intransitive, and the context may clarify the question even if the subject is not made explicit.

| | Regular (non -ik) verbs | Non-traditional | Traditional |
| | Regular (non -ik) verbs | -ik verbs | |
|---|---|---|---|
| 1st person singular indefinite | kérek | hazudok | eszem (*eszek) |
| 3rd person singular indefinite (lemma) | kér∅ | hazudik | eszik |
| Meaning | "ask" ("request") | "tell a lie" | "eat" |

Some important "traditional" -ik verbs are the following. A person may appear uneducated if s/he uses the -k ending with them for the 1st person singular form:

aggódik "worry", álmodik "dream", alszik "sleep", bízik "trust", dicsekszik "brag", dohányzik "smoke", dolgozik "work", emlékszik "remember", érdeklődik "be interested or inquire", érkezik "arrive", esküszik "swear", eszik "eat", fázik "be cold", fekszik "lie" ("recline"), foglalkozik "deal with", gondolkodik or gondolkozik "be thinking", gondoskodik "look after", gyanakszik "suspect", gyönyörködik "delight in", hallatszik "be audible", haragszik "be angry", hiányzik "be missing", igyekszik "strive, hurry", iszik "drink", játszik "play", jelentkezik "apply", költözik "move (residence)", következik "follow", különbözik "differ", lakik "live" (inhabit), látszik "be visible", működik "function", növekszik "grow", nyugszik "rest", öregszik "grow old", panaszkodik "complain", származik "originate from", találkozik "meet", tartozik "owe" or "belong", tartózkodik "stay" ("reside"), törődik "care about", unatkozik "be bored", vágyik "desire", változik "change" (refl.), verekszik "fight" (e.g. at school), veszekszik "quarrel", vetkőzik "take off clothes", viselkedik "behave" and vitatkozik "argue".

For most other verbs, the -k ending is common in the indefinite meaning, especially in casual speech. Verbs with the suffix -zik, formed from nouns (often the tool of the action), almost exclusively take the -k, such as biciklizik "ride the bicycle", gitározik "play the guitar" or mobilozik "use the mobile phone".

There are a few non-traditional -ik verbs where the -m ending is impossible and ungrammatical (except in the definite conjugation, if meaningful). These are called "pseudo -ik verbs" (álikes igék) in Hungarian. Examples:

bomlik "dissolve", (el)bújik "hide", egerészik "catch mice", érik "ripen", folyik "flow", gyűlik "assemble" (refl.), hazudik "tell a lie", hullik "fall", illik "suit", kopik "wear off", megjelenik "appear", múlik "pass", nyílik "open" (refl.), ömlik "pour" (refl.), születik "be born", (meg)szűnik "discontinue", telik "fill up", tojik "lay (eggs)", törik "get broken", tűnik "seem", válik "become" or "divorce", züllik "become depraved".

The regular non -ik verb könyörög "beg" has a hypercorrect first-person singular indefinite present form könyörgöm "I am begging" (used especially as an emphatic interjection to support an argument in spoken language), which conjugation mimics that of -ik verbs. The correct form would be könyörgök. However, it is argued by some that the form könyörgöm is not unacceptable, either, and it reflects an idiomatic expression könyörgöm (magát/az Istent) "I am begging (you/God)", which has eventually lost its object and in which the form könyörgöm actually (correctly) follows definite conjugation.

== Infinitive ==
The infinitive of a verb is the form suffixed by -ni, e.g. várni, kérni. There is a variant -ani/eni, which is used with the following groups:

- verbs ending in two consonants (e.g. játszani, tartani, küldeni, választani, festeni, mondani, hallani, ajánlani),
- verbs ending in a long vowel + t (e.g. fűteni, véteni, tanítani, bocsátani) and
- the words véd and edz (védeni and edzeni respectively).

Exceptions are állni "to stand", szállni "to fly", varrni "to sew", forrni "to boil", which have -ni despite the two consonants. This is due to the fact that, in written language, the "long" 'l' or 'r' of the stem has to be kept even in the forms where it is pronounced short.

=== Infinitive with personal suffixes ===
When an infinitive is used with an impersonal verb, the personal suffixes may be added to the infinitive to indicate the person, as in Portuguese. Except in the 3rd person singular and plural, the -i of the infinitive is dropped, e.g. Mennem kell. ("I have to go."). The person can also be indicated using -nak/-nek, e.g. Nekem kell mennem. ("I have to go.), Jánosnak mennie kell ("János has to go.")

These forms use the o/e/ö set of suffixes (Type II, like possessive suffixes do), see Personal suffixes and link vowels.

| Person | menni (to go) | látni (to see) |
|---|---|---|
| | for me to go etc. | for me to see etc. |
| 1st Sg. | mennem | látnom |
| 2nd Sg. | menned | látnod |
| 3rd Sg. | mennie | látnia |
| 1st Pl. | mennünk | látnunk |
| 2nd Pl. | mennetek | látnotok |
| 3rd Pl. | menniük | látniuk |

== Tenses ==
Most verbs have two inflected tenses, past and present, and a future form using an auxiliary verb. The verb lenni, to be, has three inflected tenses: past (volt = was), present (van = is) and future (lesz = will be).

=== Present ===
In the present tense, only sibilant-ending verbs differ from the rest, such as verbs ending in -s, -sz, -z and -dz. The chart below compares the conjugation of the regular kér 'ask' ("have a request") and vár 'wait' (as examples for front and back vowels) with the sibilant-ending keres 'look for' and mászik 'climb.' Example of verbs ending in the other two possible sonorants, -z and -dz, are húz 'pull' and edz 'train', which similarly double their stem consonants where -s and -sz are doubled (e.g. húzzuk, eddzük in the first person plural).

| Person | Indefinite conjugation | | Definite conjugation | |
| Person | Regular | Sibilant-ending | Regular | Sibilant-ending |
|---|---|---|---|---|
| 1st Sg | kérek, várok | keresek, mászok* | kérem, várom | keresem, mászom |
| 2nd Sg | kérsz, vársz | kerese**l**, mászo**l** | kéred, várod | keresed, mászod |
| 3rd Sg | kér, vár | keres, mászik* | kéri, várja | keresi, má**ssz**a |
| 1st Pl | kérünk, várunk | keresünk, mászunk | kérjük, várjuk | kere**ss**ük, má**ssz**uk |
| 2nd Pl | kértek, vártok | kerestek, másztok | kéritek, várjátok | keresitek, má**ssz**átok |
| 3rd Pl | kérnek, várnak | keresnek, másznak | kérik, várják | keresik, má**ssz**ák |
| **1st > 2nd** (e.g. 'I ask you') | kérlek, várlak | kereslek, mászlak | N/A | N/A |

*: mászik being an -ik verb, its indefinite 1st person singular form can be mászom instead of mászok in literary style. The ik ending in its indefinite 3rd person singular form naturally doesn't apply to verbs without this ending.

The forms marked in bold are those where the suffix of sibilant-ending verbs differ from the suffix of other verbs: either because of the alternative 2nd person ending l (to avoid two sibilants getting next to each other), or because of the assimilation of j. Incidentally, the latter forms (with doubled stem consonants) coincide with the subjunctive (or imperative) forms.

=== Futurity ===
Futurity can be expressed in a variety of ways:

1. By the auxiliary verb fog for any verb, expressing a strong intention or a necessity of events brought about by circumstances (fog menni = "will go", fog beszélni = "will speak", fog lenni = "will be".)
2. The verb van, uniquely, has an inflected future tense (leszek, leszel etc.). (See van (to be).)
3. By the present tense, when this is clearly a reference to a future time (e.g. the presence of explicit temporal adverbs, e.g. majd = soon) or in the case of verbs with perfective aspect. (Compare, e.g. "We're visiting Disneyland" in English: normally this indicates present tense, but adding "next July" makes it unambiguously future tense).

=== Past tense ===
The past tense is expressed with the suffix -t or -ott/-ett/-ött and inflects for person and number. As in the present tense, there are special indefinite forms for intransitive verbs and transitive verbs with direct objects that are 1st or 2nd person or indefinite, while definite forms are used for transitive verbs with definite, 3rd person direct objects, and there is a special form used just for instances where there is a 1st person subject and 2nd person direct object.

As far as the two phonetic variants are concerned, there are three types:

- Type I never uses link vowel (mostly those with "soft" ending consonants, i.e. sonorants)
- Type II only uses link vowel in the 3rd person singular indefinite (those that could be regarded as "middle-hard" consonants)
- Type III uses link vowel in every form (mostly those ending in the "hard" consonant t or a consonant cluster).

| Conjugation | Type I | | Type II | | Type III | |
|---|---|---|---|---|---|---|
| Example Verb | vár ("wait for somebody/something") | | mos ("wash somebody/something") | | tanít ("teach somebody/something") | |
| Direct Object | Indefinite | Definite | Indefinite | Definite | Indefinite | Definite |
| 1st sg. | vár**t**am | vár**t**am | mos**t**am | mos**t**am | tanít**ott**am | tanít**ott**am |
| 2nd sg. | vár**t**ál | vár**t**ad | mos**t**ál | mos**t**ad | tanít**ott**ál | tanít**ott**ad |
| 3rd sg. | vár**t** | vár**t**a | mos**ott** | mos**t**a | tanít**ott** | tanít**ott**a |
| 1st pl. | vár**t**unk | vár**t**uk | mos**t**unk | mos**t**uk | tanít**ott**unk | tanít**ott**uk |
| 2nd pl. | vár**t**atok | vár**t**átok | mos**t**atok | mos**t**átok | tanít**ott**atok | tanít**ott**átok |
| 3rd pl. | vár**t**ak | vár**t**ák | mos**t**ak | mos**t**ák | tanít**ott**ak | tanít**ott**ák |
| 1st person subj., 2nd person object | | vár**t**alak | | mos**t**alak | | tanít**ott**alak |
| Regular endings | **-l, -r, -n, -ny, -j, -ly** (e.g. tanu**l**, í**r**, pihe**n**, há**ny**, fá**j**, fo**ly**|ik); **-ad, -ed** (e.g. szal**ad**, ébr**ed**) | | **-s, -sz, -z** (e.g. á**s**, ú**sz**|ik, né**z**); **-k, -g, -p, -b, -d*, -v, -f, -gy** (e.g. la**k**|ik, vá**g**, ka**p**, do**b**, tu**d**, hí**v**, dö**f**, ha**gy**); **-at, -et with 2 or more syllables** (e.g. mut**at**, nev**et**); *: except for -ad/-ed, see I | | **monosyllabic words ending in t** (e.g. ha**t**, ve**t**, nyi**t**, kö**t**, fu**t**, ju**t**, sü**t**, ü**t**, fű**t**); **long vowel + t** (e.g. kész**ít**, tan**ít**, bocs**át**); **two consonants** (e.g. já**tsz**|ik, ta**rt**, vála**szt**, ha**ll**, hu**ll**|ik); **-dz** also belongs here (e.g. edz) | |
| Exceptions (partial list) | á**ll**, szá**ll**, va**rr** (~~III~~) | | l**át** (~~III~~) and alk**ot**; **ad**, eng**ed**, fog**ad** etc. (~~I~~); mo**nd**, ke**zd**, kü**ld**, ho**rd**, kü**zd** etc. (~~III~~); Less important exceptions: (meg)ér|ik (~~I~~), függ etc. (~~III~~), borzong etc. (~~III~~) | | × | |

Note: Strike-through Roman numbers in the last row refer to the types which would apply if the verbs concerned were regular.

If the above phonetic guidelines don't help, it may be useful as a rule of thumb to learn the rules and exceptions only for Type I and Type III and use Type II otherwise, because this latter type comprises the broadest range of verbs.

==== Regular homonymy of plain and causative forms in the same tense ====
Front-vowel unrounded verbs that end in consonant + -t may have ambiguous (coinciding, homophonous) forms between plain and causative forms. In dialects that have e-ë distinction, these forms are distinguished in speech. The syllable 'tet' always contains a "closed e" in the meaning 1 and always contains an "open e" in the meaning 2. Approximately a hundred verbs are concerned that end in one of the following endings: -jt, -lt, -mt, -nt, -rt, -st, -szt.

| Homoverb | Meaning 1 | Meaning 2 |
|---|---|---|
| Megértette. | "S/he understood it." megért ("understand") + -ette (past tense Type III, def.) | "S/he made them understand it." megért + -et- (causative) + -te (past tense Type II, def.) |
| Sejtette. | "S/he suspected it." sejt ("suspect") + -ette (past tense type III, def.) | "S/he made them suspect it." sejt + -et- (causative) + -te (past tense type II, def.) |

The past tenses of sejt ("suspect", Type III) and sejtet ("make them suspect something", Type II) are identical, except for the third person indefinite form where it is sejt|ett for sejt, but sejtet|ett for sejtet. However, it usually turns out from the argument structure and the context which meaning is intended.

This ambiguity doesn't occur with back-vowel verbs because the linking vowel is different for the normal past tense and the causative, e.g. bontotta "s/he demolished it" (bont- + -otta) vs. bontatta "s/he had it demolished" (bont- + -at- + -ta). The linking vowel can only be o for back-vowel verbs (as stated above: -ott/-ett/-ött) and the causative can only have a with back vowels (-at/-et). Similarly, it doesn't occur with front-vowel verbs with a rounded vowel, either: e.g. gyűjtötte ("s/he collected them") vs gyűjtette (s/he had them collected").

Below is a chart to review the conjugation differences between coinciding forms of the same verb. Ambiguous forms in the same person are marked in bold.

| "I understood it" etc., past, def. | "I made them understand it" etc., past, def. | "I understood something" etc., past, indef. | "I made them understand something" etc., past, indef. |
| **megértettem** **megértetted** **megértette** **megértettük** **megértettétek** **megértették** | **megértettem** **megértetted** **megértette** **megértettük** **megértettétek** **megértették** | **megértettem** **megértettél** megértett **megértettünk** **megértettetek** **megértettek** | **megértettem** **megértettél** megértetett **megértettünk** **megértettetek** **megértettek** |

==== Regular homonymy: other cases ====
Another kind of ambiguity can arise with type I verbs between the second person plural plain form and the first person singular causative form, e.g. beszéltetek (only indefinite forms involved):

- "you [pl] spoke": beszél ("speak") + -t- (past) + -etek ("you [pl]")
- "I make somebody speak": beszél + -tet- (causative) + -ek ("I")

It can also occur with similar back-vowel verbs, e.g. csináltatok "you [pl] did something" or "I have something done".

beszéltek can also have two interpretations (only indefinite forms involved, again)

- "you [pl] speak": beszél + -tek ("you [pl]")
- "they spoke": beszél + -t- (past) + -ek ("they")

For speakers that follow e-ë distinction, the syllable 'tek' always contains a closed e in the meaning you [pl] (present) and always contains an open e in the meaning third person plural past in speech.

This latter case is not possible with back-vowel verbs, due to the difference of the linking vowel: csináltok "you [pl] do something" vs. csináltak "they did something". If the affix contains the back-vowel 'o' then it is the counterpart of closed e. If the affix contains the back-vowel 'a' then it is the counterpart of open e.

Below is a chart to review the conjugation differences between coinciding forms of the same verb (again). Ambiguous forms in different persons are marked with asterisks.

| "I speak" etc., present, indef. | "I spoke" etc., past, indef. | "I make somebody speak" etc., present, indef. | "I do" etc., present, indef. | "I did" etc., past, indef. | "I have something done" etc., present, indef. |
| beszélek beszélsz beszél beszélünk beszéltek* beszélnek | beszéltem beszéltél beszélt beszéltünk beszéltetek* beszéltek* | beszéltetek* beszéltetsz beszéltet beszéltetünk beszéltettek beszéltetnek | csinálok csinálsz csinál csinálunk csináltok csinálnak | csináltam csináltál csinált csináltunk csináltatok* csináltak | csináltatok* csináltatsz csináltat csináltatunk csináltattok csináltatnak |

==== Sporadic coincidences ====
Front-vowel verbs in type III that end in -t may cause ambiguity, like between the past tense of a verb and the present tense of another. For example:

| Homonymous verb | Meaning 1 | Meaning 2 |
|---|---|---|
| Féltem. | "I was afraid." fél ("be afraid") + -tem (past tense type I, first person, indef.) | "I fear for him/her/it." félt ("fear for somebody/something") + -em (present tense, first person, def.) |
| Nem ért hozzá. | "S/he didn't touch it." hozzá|ér ("touch") + -t (past tense type I, indef.) | "S/he isn't familiar with it." ért (hozzá) ("be familiar [with something.]", present tense, indef.) |
| Köszönt. | "S/he said hello." köszön ("say hello") + -t (past tense type I, indef.) | "S/he welcomes [you]." köszönt ("welcome", present tense, indef.) |
| Megbánt valamit. | "S/he regretted something." megbán ("regret") + -t (past tense type I, indef.) | "S/he offends something." megbánt ("offend", present tense, indef.) |

Below is a chart to review the conjugation differences between coinciding forms of unrelated verbs. Ambiguous forms in the same person are marked in bold; ambiguous forms in different persons are marked with asterisks.

| "I was afraid" etc., past, indef. | "I fear for somebody" etc., present, indef. | "I fear for him/her/it" etc., present, def. | "I am not familiar with it" etc., present, indef. | "I didn't touch it" etc., past, indef. |
| **féltem** féltél **félt** **féltünk** **féltetek** féltek* | féltek* féltesz **félt** **féltünk** **féltetek** féltenek | **féltem** félted félti féltjük féltitek féltik | nem értek hozzá* nem értesz hozzá **nem ért hozzá** **nem értünk hozzá** **nem értetek hozzá** nem értenek hozzá | nem értem hozzá nem értél hozzá **nem ért hozzá** **nem értünk hozzá** **nem értetek hozzá** nem értek hozzá* |

Marked for e-ë distinction:

- The correct pronunciation of 'féltem' "I was afraid" is féltem, while 'féltem' "I fear for him/her/it" is féltëm.
- The correct pronunciation of 'féltetek' "you were afraid" is féltetëk, while 'féltetek' "you fear for somebody" is féltëtëk.
- The correct pronunciation of 'féltek' "They were afraid" is féltek, while 'féltek' "I fear for somebody" is féltëk.

== Moods ==
Hungarian verbs have 3 moods: indicative, conditional and subjunctive / imperative. The indicative has a past and non-past tense. The conditional has a non-past tense and a past form, made up of the past tense indicative as the finite verb with the non-finite verb volna. The subjunctive only has a single tense.

=== Conditional ===
Use of the conditional:

In a sentence with "if", unlike in English, the appropriate conditional tense is used in both the "if" clause and the main clause. The present conditional is used to talk about unlikely or impossible events in the present or future, e.g. Ha találkoznál a királynővel, mit mondanál? ("If you met [lit.: would meet] the Queen, what would you say?"). The past conditional is used for past events which did not happen, e.g. Ha nem találkoztunk volna a királynővel, órákkal ezelőtt megérkeztünk volna. ("If we hadn't [lit.: wouldn't have] met the Queen, we would have arrived hours ago.") (cf. the English counterfactual conditional).

==== Forms of the conditional ====
| Person | Indefinite | Definite |
|---|---|---|
| 1st Sg. | kérnék, várnék | kérném, várnám |
| 2nd Sg. | kérnél, várnál | kérnéd, várnád |
| 3rd Sg. | kérne, várna | kérné, várná |
| 1st Pl. | kérnénk, várnánk | kérnénk, várnánk |
| 2nd Pl. | kérnétek, várnátok | kérnétek, várnátok |
| 3rd Pl. | kérnének, várnának | kérnék, várnák |

The front-vowel suffix at the end of the 1st person singular indefinite form of the back-vowel verb (várnék) is an apparent exception from the vowel harmony: it may serve to distinguish from the 3rd person plural definite form (várnák). (The indefinite kérnék forms still coincide, just like the 1st and 2nd person plural endings.)

The only opposition between the 3rd person singular definite and indefinite forms is vowel length (although a–á and e–é differ in quality as well), which can be considered one of the rare fusional traits in Hungarian.

A linking vowel is inserted into verbs with a consonant cluster or long vowel + t at the end, e.g. festenék 'I would paint', tanítanék 'I would teach', analogously to the rules given for the infinitive form.

=== Subjunctive (imperative) ===
Uses of the subjunctive:

1. For a command (i.e. an imperative)
2. For a request
3. For hesitant questions with 1st singular subject (cf. English "Shall I …?")
4. For suggestions for joint action with 1st plural subject (cf. English "Let's …")
5. For wishes (3rd person singular and plural)
6. In subordinate clauses after verbs expressing orders, requests, suggestions, wishes, permission, etc.
7. In hogy subordinate clauses expressing purpose

==== Forms of the subjunctive ====
In the subjunctive or imperative mood, verbs with a sibilant or t ending differ from the rest, with two groups for the t ending: those with a preceding short vowel, and those with a preceding long vowel or a consonant.

Meanings of the verbs below: kér 'ask (have a request)', vár 'wait', keres 'look for', olvas 'read', fest 'paint', szeret 'love', fut 'run', ment 'save', tanít 'teach', böngészik 'browse', mászik 'climb', ereszt 'let go', akaszt 'hang', néz 'look at', húz 'pull', edz 'train', lopódzik 'sneak'.

INDEFINITE CONJUGATION
| Stem Forms | kér, vár | keres, olvas | szeret, fut | ment, tanít | böngészik, mászik | ereszt, akaszt | néz, húz | edz, lopódzik |
| Original Stem | (all but the following) | -S | short vowel + T | other + T | -SZ | -SZT | -Z | -DZ |
| Altered Stem | above + J | SS | | TS | SSZ | | ZZ | DDZ |
|---|---|---|---|---|---|---|---|---|
| 1st Sg | kérjek, várjak | keressek, olvassak | szeressek, fussak | mentsek, tanítsak | böngésszek, másszak | eresszek, akasszak | nézzek, húzzak | eddzek, lopóddzak |
| 2nd Sg | kérj(él), várj(ál) | keress(él), olvass(ál) | szeress(él), fuss(ál) | ments(él), taníts(ál) | böngéssz(él), mássz(ál) | eressz(él), akassz(ál) | nézz(él), húzz(ál) | eddz(él), lopóddz(ál) |
| 3rd Sg | kérjen, várjon | keressen, olvasson | szeressen, fusson | mentsen, tanítson | böngésszen, másszon | eresszen, akasszon | nézzen, húzzon | eddzen, lopóddzon |
| 1st Pl | kérjünk, várjunk | keressünk, olvassunk | szeressünk, fussunk | mentsünk, tanítsunk | böngésszünk, másszunk | eresszünk, akasszunk | nézzünk, húzzunk | eddzünk, lopóddzunk |
| 2nd Pl | kérjetek, várjatok | keressetek, olvassatok | szeressetek, fussatok | mentsetek, tanítsatok | böngésszetek, másszatok | eresszetek, akasszatok | nézzetek, húzzatok | eddzetek, lopóddzatok |
| 3rd Pl | kérjenek, várjanak | keressenek, olvassanak | szeressenek, fussanak | mentsenek, tanítsanak | böngésszenek, másszanak | eresszenek, akasszanak | nézzenek, húzzanak | eddzenek, lopóddzanak |

DEFINITE CONJUGATION
| Stem Forms | kér, vár | keres, olvas | szeret, fut | ment, tanít | böngészik, mászik | ereszt, akaszt | néz, húz | edz, lopódzik |
| Original Stem | (all but the following) | -S | short vowel + T | other + T | -SZ | -SZT | -Z | -DZ |
| Altered Stem | above + J | SS | | TS | SSZ | | ZZ | DDZ |
|---|---|---|---|---|---|---|---|---|
| 1st Sg | kérjem, várjam | keressem, olvassam | szeressem, fussam | mentsem, tanítsam | böngésszem, másszam | eresszem, akasszam | nézzem, húzzam | eddzem, lopóddzam |
| 2nd Sg | kér(je)d, vár(ja)d | keres(se)d, olvas(sa)d | szeres(se)d, fus(sa)d | ments(e)d, taníts(a)d | böngészd/böngésszed, mászd/másszad | ereszd/eresszed, akaszd/akasszad | néz(ze)d, húz(za)d | edzd/eddzed, lopódzd/lopóddzad |
| 3rd Sg | kérje, =várja | keresse, =olvassa | szeresse, fussa | mentse, tanítsa | böngéssze, =mássza | eressze, akassza | nézze, =húzza | eddze, =lopóddza |
| 1st Pl | kérjük, =várjuk | =keressük, =olvassuk | szeressük, fussuk | mentsük, tanítsuk | =böngésszük, =másszuk | eresszük, akasszuk | =nézzük, =húzzuk | =eddzük, =lopóddzuk |
| 2nd Pl | kérjétek, =várjátok | keressétek, =olvassátok | szeressétek, fussátok | mentsétek, tanítsátok | böngésszétek, =másszátok | eresszétek, akasszátok | nézzétek, =húzzátok | eddzétek, =lopóddzátok |
| 3rd Pl | kérjék, =várják | keressék, =olvassák | szeressék, fussák | mentsék, tanítsák | böngésszék, =másszák | eresszék, akasszák | nézzék, =húzzák | eddzék, =lopóddzák |
| 1st > 2nd | kérjelek, várjalak | keresselek, olvassalak | szeresselek, *fussalak | mentselek, tanítsalak | böngésszelek, másszalak | eresszelek, akasszalak | nézzelek, húzzalak | eddzelek, *lopóddzalak |

Note 1: Fest 'paint' is the only single example (according to the Reverse-alphabetical dictionary of the Hungarian Language) that ends in st, and there is no -ik verb with these two ending consonants. This verb is conjugated like the szeret, fut type: fessek, fess(él), fessen, fessünk, fessetek, fessenek; fessem, fes(se)d, fesse, fessük, fessétek, fessék; fesselek.

Note 2: the definite conjugation may be ungrammatical for verbs that cannot have an object, e.g. fut 'run', lopódzik 'sneak'. However, these forms may occur in constructions like végigfutja a távot 'run all through the distance', or perhaps even végiglopóddza az épületeket 'sneak through the buildings'. This solution doesn't work, though, for the forms affecting the 2nd person (unless in a poetic, vocative sense), that is why they are marked with an asterisk.

Forms marked with a preceding equality sign are identical with the indicative forms.

Second person forms have a short and a long variant both in indefinite and definite conjugation, with minimal difference in style.

== Definite and indefinite conjugations ==
In Hungarian, verbs not only show agreement with their subjects but also carry information on the definiteness of their direct objects. This results in two types of conjugations: definite (used if there is a definite object) and indefinite (if there is no definite object):

| | | Verb with suffix for present tense, 1st person singular | Object |
|---|---|---|---|
| Intransitive verb | | Olvasok (I'm reading) (type 1 ― suffix indicating no definite object) | ∅ |
| Transitive verb | with an indefinite object | Olvasok (I'm reading) (type 1 ― suffix indicating no definite object) | egy könyvet. (a book) |
| Transitive verb | with a definite object | Olvasom (I'm reading it) (type 2 ― suffix indicating definite object) | a könyvet. (the book) |

Basically, the indefinite conjugation is used if there is no definite object, that is i) if there is no object at all, or ii) if the object is indefinite (see details below). However, exceptionally, the indefinite conjugation is also used if the object is a 1st- or 2nd-person pronoun, either stated or not (even though the reference of personal pronouns is definite by nature).

An object is indefinite if it is:

1. a noun with no determiner
2. a noun with an indefinite article
3. a noun with a numeral or an indefinite determiner (e.g. "any, some, every" but not "all [the]")
4. an indefinite pronoun such as "something, anything, everyone" etc.
5. an interrogative pronoun (except "which?")
6. a first- or second-person pronoun, whether stated or unstated
7. a relative pronoun

The definite conjugation is used if the verb has a definite object, which can be:

1. a proper noun (some types with zero article, other types preceded by a definite article)
2. a noun with a definite article
3. a noun with the determiners melyik, hányadik ('which'), mindegyik ('each'), or az összes ('all'); the noun may be omitted in these constructions
4. a 3rd-person pronoun, either stated or unstated
5. the reflexive pronoun (a form of maga, '-self')
6. a demonstrative pronoun ("this, that")
7. the indefinite pronoun mind ('all [of something]'), including mindkét ('both'), or a noun phrase determined by it
8. a subordinate clause (like "[the fact] that…" or "if/whether…")

A special suffix (-lak/-lek) is used if the verb has a first-person singular subject AND a second-person (singular or plural) object (in the informal conjugation), e.g. Szeretlek. ("I love you" ― singular), Szeretlek titeket. ("I love you all" ― plural).

Examples:

| Indefinite (látsz) | Definite (látod) |
|---|---|
| Látsz. (You (can) see ∅.); Látsz valamit. (You see something.); Látsz egy könyvet. (You see a book.); Látsz engemet/bennünket. (You see me/us.) (!); Látsz valamennyit/kettőt. (You see some/two.); Nem látsz semmit/senkit. (You don't see anything/anyone.); Látsz mindent/mindenkit. (You see everything/everyone.); Kit/mit/mennyit látsz? (Who/What/How many do you see?); Az ember/könyv akit/amit látsz... (The person/book (that/which) you see is...) | Látod a könyvet. (You see the book.); Látod ezt a könyvet. (You see this book. Látod őt/azt/őket. (You see him/her/it/them.); Látod magadat. (You see yourself.); Látod Máriát. You see Mary. Látod mindkettőt/mind a két könyvet. (You see both/both books.); Látod mindent/minden könyvet. (You see everything/all the books. Melyik embert/könyvet látod? (Which (person/book) do you see?); Látod, hogy itt vagyok. (You can see (that) I'm here.) |

=== No explicit object ===
If no explicit object is present, the most common interpretation of the definite verb forms is including "him/her/it". If an indefinite verb form semantically requires an object, "me" or "you [sg]" or – obviously – an indefinite object (third person) can be inferred: "something". (The plural forms are generally made explicit.) This difference makes it possible for the writer or speaker to refer to people without making them explicit. In most cases it is enough through the context to differentiate between 3rd-person and non-3rd-person pronouns.

Definite examples:

- olvassa ("s/he is reading") – most common meaning: s/he is reading it (the book etc.)
- nézi ("s/he is looking") – most common meaning: s/he is looking at him/her/it

Indefinite examples:

- fut ("s/he is running") – usually can't have an object so its meaning is unambiguous
- olvas ("s/he is reading") – most common meaning: s/he is reading something (the object may be omitted like in English)
- néz ("s/he is looking") – most common meaning: s/he is looking at me or you (or: gazing in the air)

== Grammatical voice ==
Hungarian uses active forms not only in the active sense (e.g. "He opened the door") and in the middle voice sense (e.g. "The door opened"), but also uses the third person plural active form to express the passive (e.g. "The door was opened"). For example, Megvizsgálják a gyereket literally means "They examine the child", but it is more commonly meant like "The child is examined". The passive voice meaning is shown by the fact that the third person plural form can be used even when only one agent is meant (the child is examined by one doctor).

Another way to express the passive meaning is with middle voice lexical forms or unaccusative verbs, e.g. épül: "being built"/ intransitive (vs. épít "build"/ transitive), alakul: "developing form"/ intransitive (cf. alakít "form"/ transitive). Here the suffix -ul/-ül expresses the middle voice (creating intransitive verbs), as opposed to -ít which expresses the active (creating transitive verbs). Middle voice forms can also be created from some plain verbs by adding -ódik/-ődik, e.g. íródik "get written" (from ír "write"), ütődik "get hit" (from üt "hit"). These active/middle pairs are available for a considerable proportion of Hungarian verbs.

In the perfect, there is a third way to express passive meaning: the existential verb van (see van (to be)) plus the adverbial participle ending in -va/-ve (see Adverb derivation), e.g. meg van írva "it is written" (from megír "write"). It is used when the result of the action is emphasized. It can be formed in the past perfect and future perfect, too, with the past and future forms of van. – A similar structure is used in a past meaning with lett: meg lett írva "it was written" or "it has been written" (sometimes "it had been written").

Though generally considered obsolete, the actual passive form does occur, formed with -atik/-etik or -tatik/-tetik (that is, adding -ik to a causative suffix). The only common example is születik ("be born", from szül "give birth"). However, the construction can be used more generally, as in adatik ("be given", from ad "give"), viseltetik ("owe somebody certain feelings", from visel "bear"), foglaltatik ("be included", from (magába) foglal "include").

== An example of a regular verb ==
Here is a regular verb, kér ("ask, request"). The personal suffixes are marked in bold.

kér ("ask")
| | Indefinite | | | | | | Definite |
Indicative Mood
| **Present** | kér**ek** | kér**sz** | kér | kér**ünk** | kér**tek** | kér**nek** | kér**em** | kér**ed** | kér**i** | kér**jük** | kér**itek** | kér**ik** |
| **Past** | kért**em** | kért**él** | kért | kért**ünk** | kért**etek** | kért**ek** | kért**em** | kért**ed** | kért**e** | kért**ük** | kért**étek** | kért**ék** |
Conditional Mood
| **Present** | kérné**k** | kérné**l** | kérne | kérné**nk** | kérné**tek** | kérné**nek** | kérné**m** | kérné**d** | kérné | kérné**nk** | kérné**tek** | kérné**k** |
| **Past** | kért**em** volna | kért**él** volna | kért volna | kért**ünk** volna | kért**etek** volna | kért**ek** volna | kért**em** volna | kért**ed** volna | kért**e** volna | kért**ük** volna | kért**étek** volna | kért**ék** volna |
Subjunctive Mood
| **Present** | kérj**ek** | kérj**él** or kérj | kérj**en** | kérj**ünk** | kérj**etek** | kérj**enek** | kérj**em** | kérj**ed** or kér**d** | kérj**e** | kérj**ük** | kérj**étek** | kérj**ék** |

== Modal and causative suffixes ==
Hungarian has two forms which can be added to any verb stem to modify the meaning. These are sometimes referred to as "infixes", since they appear between the verb stem and its conjugation suffixes, but technically, true infixes are inserted inside a morpheme.

The suffix -hat-/-het- has a modal meaning of permission or opportunity, e.g. beszélek "I speak", beszélhetek "I may speak" or "I am allowed to speak".

Note: Ability is usually expressed with the auxiliar verb tud (Tudok beszélni, "I can speak"). See Auxiliary verbs (modal and temporal).

The suffix -at-/-et- and -tat-/-tet- have a causative meaning. It can express "having something done" or "having/making someone do something". For example: beszélek "I speak", beszéltetek "I make somebody speak", beszéltetem "I make him/her/it speak". (Coincidentally, this is the same form as "you [pl] spoke", analysed beszél|t|etek, see Past tense.)

The suffix -tat/-tet is used if the word ends in vowel + -t or if the stem ends in a consonant different from -t, but it has two or more syllables (excluding the verbal particle). In other cases, -at/-et is used: that is, with words ending in a consonant + t and with one-syllable words ending in a consonant different from -t.

| Ending | -t | | not -t |
| Ending | vowel + -t | consonant + -t | not -t |
|---|---|---|---|
| One syllable | süt**tet** "to have something baked", lát**tat** "to make something seen" | gyűjt**et** "to have something collected", fest**et** "to have something painted" | ír**at** "to have something written", mos**at** "to have something washed", fürd**et** "to give somebody a bath" Also: ki+dob**at** "to have somebody thrown out", el+fog**at** "to have somebody caught" (See the exceptions below) |
| Several syllables | tanít**tat** "to have somebody taught", felszólít**tat** "to have somebody warned" | felébreszt**et** "to have somebody woken up", halaszt**at** "to have something postponed" | beszél**tet** "to have somebody speak", dolgoz**tat** "to make somebody work", olvas**tat** "to have somebody read" |

The monosyllabic words which don't end in vowel + -t, but have -tat/-tet in the causative are áz·ik (áztat), buk·ik (buktat), kop·ik (koptat), él (éltet), kel (keltet), lép (léptet), szűn·ik (szüntet [!]), szök·ik (szöktet).

Some monosyllabic words not ending in vowel + -t have both -at/-et and -tat/-tet as causative forms, with differences in meaning. For example:

- szop·ik (szopat: to make someone suck on something; szoptat: to allow someone to suck on something, e.g. during breastfeeding)
- hány (hányat: to make someone throw something (e.g. firewood) into a heap; hánytat: to help someone vomit)
- jár (járat: to ensure someone (e.g. a child) goes somewhere (e.g. to school) regularly, to start and operate (e.g. a machine); jártat: to lead someone or something (e.g. an animal) while walking).

== Verbal noun ==
A noun is formed from a verb by adding -ás/-és to the verb stem (cf. gerund in English), e.g. Az úszás egészséges. ("Swimming is healthy.")

== Participles ==
There are three participles in Hungarian. They are formed by adding the following suffixes to the verb stem:

- -ó/-ő - present participle, e.g. író ember ("a writing person")
- -ott/-ett/-ött/-t - past participle, e.g. megírt levél ("a written letter" /"the letter that has been written")
- -andó/-endő - future participle, e.g. írandó levél ("a letter to be written")

Since the past participle usually expresses a perfected action/event, the verb sometimes changes into its perfective counterpart by taking a verbal particle (igekötő) with this function, as seen in the above example (megírt levél). This verbal particle may, however, be replaced by a noun, e.g. Annának írt levél ("a letter written to Anna"). – See more under Hungarian syntax.

== Verb particles/prefixes (igekötők) ==
Hungarian verbs can have verb particles or prefixes, similar to phrasal verbs in English. The most common ones are meg- (perfective, but some other ones, too, can take this function), fel- ("up"), le- ("down"/"off"), be- ("in"), ki- ("out"), el- ("away"), vissza- ("back"), át- ("over"/"through"), oda- ("there"), ide- ("here"), össze- ("together"), szét- ("apart"), rá- ("on top").

These can produce literal or figurative, idiomatic meanings. For example ír ("write"), leír ("write down"), beír ("write into") can figuratively mean: leír ("declare as useless, write off"), beír ("write up a reprimand [to a schoolchild]"); also rúg ("kick"), kirúg ("fire somebody, kick out"), berúg ("get drunk"). Prefixes can express subtle differences: e.g. meghízik "get fat" vs. elhízik "get obese", literally "fatten away")They often serve to change the verb into perfective (along with other factors).

When the particle precedes the verb without any other inserted word, they are used as one word, e.g. Leírja ("He writes it down"). The particle may instead follow the verb for various syntactic reasons. It may be displaced from the leading position by a stressed element of the sentence (the focus), e.g. Ő írja le ("It's him who writes it down") or a negation, e.g. Nem írja le ("He doesn't write it down"), or in the imperative mood, e.g. Írjad le! ("Write it down!"). Finally, it may also indicate continuity, e.g. Lement a lépcsőn ("He went down the stairs") vs. Ment le a lépcsőn ("He was going down the stairs").

If the verb is in the infinitive, the finite verb is placed between them, e.g. Le akarja írni ("He wants to write it down") or Le tudja írni ("He can write it down").

The particle may considerably affect the case of the complement: for example, the verb kezd ("start something") can be modified by several different verb particles, but their complement (indirect object) agrees with the particle:

- **el**kezd valami**t** (accusative)
- **neki**kezd valami**nek** (dative)
- **bele**kezd valami**be** (illative)
- **hozzá**kezd valami**hez** (allative)

When giving a short positive answer to a yes/no question, the particle can refer back to the whole sentence, see Yes/no questions. e.g. Elkezdted? El! ("Did you start it? Yes!")

In literary style, articles can be reduplicated to indicate a gradual or stuttering action: ki-kijött a mὁkus ("the squirrel crept out").

=== Exceptional cases ===
A few words begin with a syllable which is a homonym of a particle, e.g. felel ("reply"), lehel ("breathe/puff"), kiált ("give a shout") and beszél ("speak"), where the first syllable is an integral part of the morpheme, not a particle modifying a verb stem. Another is fellebbez ("appeal [in court]"), from the adverb fellebb ("upper", today: feljebb). These syllables do not function as particles: compare the above kiált (no compound) with ki|áll ("stand out", a compound): nem kiált ("he doesn't give a shout"), but nem áll ki ("he doesn't stand out"). An entire verb may occasionally have such a homonym, e.g. betűz ("spell [with letters]", no compound), but be|tűz ("stick in" or "blaze in", a compound).

In some cases, an original compound word has become fused into a single inseparable morpheme. For example, kirándul ("go hiking") was originally analyzed as ki + rándul, but current usage is Kirándulni akar ("s/he wants to go hiking"), not Ki akar rándulni, which is obsolete and only used jokingly.

Some verbs do not admit separation because they are formed from a noun with a prefixed particle. An example is befolyásol ("influence", v), derived from the noun befolyás ("influence", n), itself a calque from German Einfluß, literally "in-flow". In the derived verb befolyásol, the particle be- cannot be separated, since there is no verb ~~folyásol~~. Another example is kivitelez ("implement") from kivitel ("implementation, execution", literally "carrying out"). Similarly, ellenőriz 'check', derived from the noun ellenőr ("inspector"), stays together as Nem ellenőrzök ("I don't check"), in contrast to ellenáll ("resist"), which separates as in Nem állok ellen ("I don't resist"). A common solecism among native speakers is the case of feltételez ("suppose" or "assume"), which comes from the noun feltétel ("condition"), but is still often separated: ?fel sem tételezhetjük, ?fel kell tételeznünk ("we can't even assume, we must suppose"), instead of the correct forms nem is feltételezhetjük, feltételeznünk kell.

== Auxiliary verbs (modal and temporal) ==
Most Hungarian auxiliary verbs are impersonal; beside them, the suffixed infinitive is used. A few are conjugated. (Note: personal suffixes are marked in bold.)

| Auxiliary verb | Meaning | Form | Example with meaning | |
|---|---|---|---|---|
| kell | obligation | impersonal | kell menn**em** | I must/have to go |
| kellene /kéne | advice & suggestions | impersonal | kellene menn**em** kéne menn**em** | I should/ought to go |
| muszáj | strong obligation | impersonal | muszáj menn**em** | I have got to go |
| szabad | permission | impersonal | szabad menn**em** | I am allowed to go |
| tilos | prohibition | impersonal | tilos menn**em** | I must not go |
| fog | future intention | conjugated | fog**ok** menni | I am going to go |
| tud | ability | conjugated | tud**ok** menni | I can go |
| Modal suffix | | | | |
| -hat/-het | opportunity, permission | conjugated | mehet**ek** | I can go I may go |

The suffix -hat/-het mentioned in the last row can be further conjugated, just like any verb.

The verb lehet is used impersonally, e.g. oda lehet menni "one can go there".

== The verb szokik ==
The verb szokik is conjugated like a regular past tense one (though it can have the indefinite and the definite forms, too), however, used with an infinitive, it has the meaning of a habitual action which includes the present time.

Examples:

- Szoktam álmodni ("I dream usually")
- Meg szoktam mosni ("I usually wash it")

== Irregular verbs ==
The verbs van ("to be"), jön ("to come") and megy ("to go") have an irregular present tense and irregular stems for different tenses. jön also has irregular forms in the subjunctive. A further group of 9 verbs have irregular stems for different tenses, but follow the same pattern of irregularity as each other. A few other verbs shorten or drop a vowel with certain suffixes.

**A regular verb compared to an irregular**
| Regular verb: él (to live) | | Irregular verb: megy (to go) | |
| **Past** | **Present** | **Past** | **Present** |
| él**tem** | él**ek** | me**ntem** | megy**ek** |
| él**tél** | él**sz** | me**ntél** | m**ész** (sometimes also mégy) |
| él**t** | él | me**nt** | megy |
| él**tünk** | él**ünk** | me**ntünk** | megy**ünk** |
| él**tetek** | él**tek** | me**ntetek** | me**ntek** |
| él**tek** | él**nek** | me**ntek** | me**nnek** |

== van (to be) ==
The verb "to be" in Hungarian is van (3rd person), lenni (infinitive).

=== Use ===
When the verb is used as a copula i.e. if one speaks about what someone or something is, it is omitted in the third person singular and plural of the present tense. The verb is required in all other tenses ("volt", "lesz") and persons ("vagyok", "vagy", "vagyunk", "vagytok"), and also when speaking about where or how something is, or to emphasize the existence or availability of something the verb is required too. There is a hierarchy according to which the "van" verb is omitted.

Lets name these hierarchical steps the steps of "van's omission"

1. Would there be a verb in the sentence in the first place? - if so, then "van" might be omittable in the **next** steps
2. Is the subject in third person singular form? - if it is, then it might be omittable in the **next** steps
3. Is the sentence **not** passive voice? - if it is **not**, then it might be omittable in the **next** steps
4. Is the sentence present tense? - if it is, then it might be omittable in the **next** steps
5. Is the subject **not** possessed? - if it is **not**, then it might be omittable in the **next** step
6. Is the subject **straight** this, or that? - if it is, then "van" **must** be omittable by this time
7. "Van" is proven to be impossible to omit **against** all the effort in the **previous steps**

Examples:

1. A több az jobb ∅. - The more, the merrier ∅
  - (both English, and Hungarian are using no verbs: "van's omission" 1. step)
2. Péter orvos ∅. – Peter **is** a doctor (**Who**, or **what** is Peter?)
  - (speaking about what someone is: "van's omission" 6. step)
3. Péter jól **van**. – Peter **is** well (**How** is Peter?)
  - (speaking about **how** someone is: "van's omission" 6. step)
4. Péter itt **van**. – Peter **is** here (**Where** is Peter?)
  - (speaking about **where** someone is: "van's omission" 6. step)
5. Péter Juliskánál **van**. – Peter **is** at Juliet (**Where** is Peter?)
  - (speaking about **where** someone is: "van's omission" 6. step)
6. Péter Juliskáé ∅. – Peter **is** Juliet's (**Whose** is Peter?)
  - (speaking about what **possesses** something: "van's omission" 5. step)
7. Péter jó fiú ∅. - Peter **is** a good boy (**Is** Peter a good boy?)
  - (speaking about **is** someone something: "van's omission" 6. step)
8. Péter orvos **volt**. – Peter **was** a doctor (Who **was** Peter?)
  - (speaking about **was** someone something: "van's omission" 4. step)
9. Orvos **vagyok**. – I **am** a doctor (Who am **i**?)
  - (speaking about am **i** something: "van's omission" 2. step)
10. Az ég kék ∅. - The sky **is** blue. (**What** color is the sky?)
  - (speaking about something's attribute: "van's omission" 6. step)
11. A szobor kőből **van**. - The statue **is** made out of stone. (What the statue is made **of**?)
  - (speaking about what is something made of: "van's omission" 6. step)
12. Szoborból négy **van**. - There **are** four statues. (**How many** statues are there?)
  - (speaking about **how many** are there of something: "van's omission" 6. step)
13. Kék **vagyok**. - I **am** blue. (What color am **i**?)
  - (speaking about am **i** something: "van's omission" 2. step)
14. Az ég **vagyok**. - I **am** the sky. (What am **i**?)
  - (speaking about am **i** something: "van's omission" 2. step)
15. Ő Péter ∅ - He **is** Peter (**Who** is that person?)
  - (speaking about what someone is: "van's omission" 6. step)
16. Az ajtó zárva **van** - The door **is** closed (Is the door lock**ed**?)
  - (speaking with passive voice: "van's omission" 3. step)
17. A bolt nyitva **van** - The shop **is** open (Is the door open(-**ed**)?)
  - (speaking with passive voice: "van's omission" 3. step)

The non-copula form of van is also used to express the equivalent of "There is/are":

- **Van** orvos a szobában. – **There is** a doctor in the room.

The negation of the third person van (plural vannak) as a non-copula verb is the suppletive nincs (plural nincsenek):

- Itt **van** Péter. – Peter **is** here.
- **Nincs** itt Péter. – Peter **isn't** here.

Hungarian has no verb which is equivalent to "to have". Instead, ownership/possession are expressed in various other ways including to use "van" with a possessive suffix on the noun. This makes possessives in Hungarian very different to English:

1. Van egy könyve**m** - **I** have a book
2. Van könyve**m** - (Meaning is lost during translation)
  - In English it would roughly be translated to one of these (maybe all of these even):
    - ~**I** have the book
    - ~**I** do not lack at least one of **my** books
    - ~**I** have all the books at **me** that are necessary in this context
  - That is because the word for book can also be meant plural here without "i", and "k" marks, and because there is **no** article
3. Könyve**i**m vanna**k** - I have book**s**
  - Contrary to "Van könyvem" in this case books are plural explicitly, and this makes translation possible to English while meaning is preserved
4. (Meaning is lost during translation) - **I** have the book
  - In Hungarian there is **no** "Van a könyvem" because the English version is not accusative, but invariant (does not regard it), however in Hungarian the word for book must **not** be in accusative case when using "van" to possess with. Also "van" does **not** mean "to have" **word for word**
  - The Hungarian version would roughly be ~megszerezte**m** a könyvet~ which in English would roughly be "**I** have got the book"
  - Birtoklo**m** a könyvet is a good candidate to translation, but that would rather mean "**I** possess the book", or "**I** own the book" with both translations are treating book in accusative case (marked with "t")
5. Az a könyvem van, amelyik... - I have the book, which...
  - In this case the word for book is no longer in accusative case, and is possible to say with definite article, and "van" verb in the same clause

=== Conjugation ===
Like the verb "to be" in many other languages, van is irregular. It comes from three (or four) bases: vagy- (or van-), vol-, and len-. These overlap to some extent with the verb lesz ("become"). As it cannot have an object (except in passive voice), it does not have definite forms. It is the only verb in Hungarian which has a future form.

Indicative Mood
| Present Tense (Passive voice, or possession) | vagy**ok** | vagy | van | vagy**unk** | vagy**tok** | van**nak** |
| Past Tense | volt**am** | volt**ál** | volt | volt**unk** | volt**atok** | volt**ak** |
| Future Tense | lesz**ek** | lesz**el** | lesz | lesz**ünk** | lesz**tek** | lesz**nek** |
Conditional Mood
| Present Tense | lenné**k** or volné**k** | lenné**l** or volná**l** | lenne or volna | lenné**nk** or volná**nk** | lenné**tek** or volná**tok** | lenné**nek** or volná**nak** |
| Past Tense | lett**em** volna | lett**él** volna | lett volna | lett**ünk** volna | lett**etek** volna | lett**ek** volna |
Subjunctive Mood
| Present Tense | legy**ek** | legy**él** or légy | legyen | legy**ünk** | legy**etek** | legy**enek** |

There is little difference between the two conditional forms. In theory, lennék etc. are preferred when an option is considered as possible (e.g. Ha otthon lennék, "if I were at home") and volnék etc. are preferred when it is considered impossible (e.g. Ha rózsa volnék, "if I were a rose"), but the limits are rather vague. It is probably not by chance that the former is akin to the future form (leszek), which might still become true, and the latter to the past form (voltam), which is already determined. In practice, the lennék series is somewhat more frequently used in both senses.

=== Notes ===
Currently it is arguable whether "van" is the only present tense verb for "to be" considering "volt", and "lesz" with each of their own conjugations to their respective tenses.

- For example, the verb "lesz" is arguably a better candidate to be the base form of infinitive verb "lenni" with its past tense is arguably "lett"
  - "volt" is arguably a better candidate to be the base form of infinitive verb "volni"
- Also both "volt", and "lesz" are arguably the base forms of "volna", and "lenne"
- Also considering "lehetett volna", and "volhatott volna" use cases, or conjugations of each of these verbs beside the other clues makes the respective "lesz", and "volt" verbs susceptible to rather be present tense verbs themselves instead of them past, and future tense conjugations of the "van" verb
  - This actually would be parallel to the English "will" auxiliary verb that is also arguably a present tense verb itself too with past tense "would", but that is used in future tense sentences
- Despite any of this "lesz", and "volt" verbs can be interpreted as the future, and past tense conjugations of the "van" verb **indeed** to a near impossible to foretell extent
  - One such extent is that the "van" verb will often be missing in present tense when its namely conjugations "volt", and "lesz" are present in their respective tenses given the same sentence in a different tense
  - Another such extent is that only the namely present tense "van" possesses a counter opposite word "nincs", and in other tenses these phenomena are composite using the word "nem" (meaning no, not) with the respective verbs "lesz", or "volt", but an expected conjugation to the word "nincs"
  - Another such extent is that the "van" verb is expected to always miss from third person with the subject of a sentence "is" something, except it does **not** always miss. When the subject is missing (passive voice), "van" is not missing
    - For example, in "A bolt be van zárva" - "The shop is closed" passive voice sentence the present tense "van" verb is present in the third person singular form, yet the subject is missing, so the lacking of it can not link the subject to its complement the linguistic theory copula suggests here (There is no such thing alone as "A bolt bezárva" (although there might be when such things are listed one after the other - with explicit context))
  - Another such extent is that with "van" verb existence can **not** be emphasized for the same reason it is missing, yet no verb is absent in Hungarian language when it must be emphasized.
    - For example "Ő okos" (She is smart) with emphasization: "Ő az okos" (She is the smart) - no "van" verb
    - The only other emphasization possible in the "van" verb's case is the "bb" suffix, and the "leg" + adjective + "bb" structure this case, not mentioning that the word "nincs" can not be emphasized the same.
    - For example "Ő okosabb" (She is smarter), and "Ő a legokosabb" (She is the smartest) - no "van" verb
    - In other words "van" is not even vaguely present, or meant in these sentences, so it is way too likely that it does not mean "to be" in English, yet it can be translated to it keeping a selective context in mind
    - "Van" is more like "there is" in English compared to "to be", but not exactly
  - Translation of "van" is somewhat similar to the Spanish words' to "to be" translation, except "van" is mainly present in Spanish "estar" verb's case, with a few exceptions of Spanish "ser" verb's case, otherwise it is missing implicitly in the Spanish "ser" verb's case
    - Exceptions of Spanish "ser" verb's case:
      1. Hungarian "vagyok", "vagy", "vagyunk", "vagytok" cases are told the Spanish "estar" verb's case, not "ser"
      2. Passive voice in these languages are using the opposite "to be" verb. In Spanish it is "ser" unlike in Hungarian in which the used verb for passive voice is closer to (if not exactly) Spanish "estar"
    - Looking at the Spanish using specifically different verbs for cases from which exactly "van" is expected to be just "omitted", verbs "vagyok", "vagy", "vagyunk", "vagytok" are arguably the conjugations of "vagy", but "van" (it is worth mentioning that possessions, and passive voices also include conjugations of "vagy" with "van" **not** omitted in Hungarian)
