= Distributive case =

Grammatical case

The distributive case (abbreviated distr) is used on nouns for the meanings of 'per' or 'each.'

== Forms ==
In Hungarian, it is -nként and expresses the manner when something happens to each member of a set one by one (e.g., fejenként "per head", esetenként "in some case"), or the frequency in time (hetenként "once a week", tízpercenként "every ten minutes").

In the Finnish language, this adverb type is rare, even rarer in the singular. Its ending is -ttain/-ttäin. The basic meaning is "separately for each". For example, maa ("country") becomes maittain for an expression like Laki ratifioidaan maittain ("The law is ratified separately in each country"). It can be used to distribute the action to frequent points in time, e.g., päivä (day) has the plural distributive päivittäin (each day).

It can mean also "in (or with) regard to the (cultural) perspective" when combined with a word referring to an inhabitant (-lais-). Frequently Finns (suomalaiset) say that suomalaisittain tuntuu oudolta, että ..., or "in the Finnish perspective, it feels strange that ...".
