= Spanish prepositions =

Prepositions in the Spanish language

Prepositions in the Spanish language, like those in other languages, are a set of connecting words (such as con, de or para) that serve to indicate a relationship between a content word (noun, verb, or adjective) and a following noun phrase (or noun, or pronoun), which is known as the object of the preposition. The relationship is typically spatial or temporal, but prepositions express other relationships as well. As implied by the name, Spanish "prepositions" (like those of English) are positioned before their objects. Spanish does not place these function words after their objects, which would be postpositions.

Spanish prepositions can be classified as either "simple", consisting of a single word, or "compound", consisting of two or three words. The prepositions of Spanish form a closed class and so they are a limited set to which new items are rarely added. Many Spanish school pupils memorize the following list: a, ante, bajo, cabe, con, contra, de, desde, durante, en, entre, hacia, hasta, mediante, para, por, según, sin, so, sobre, and tras. The list includes two archaic prepositions—so (“under”) and cabe (“beside”), and it excludes vía (“by way of, via”) and pro (“in favor of”), two Latinisms that have been recently adopted into the language.

Some common Spanish prepositions, simple and compound, are listed below with their meanings.

== Some frequent simple prepositions in Spanish ==
=== a ===
A is most often translated as "to" or "at"; its main uses are the following:

- It indicates movement to a destination:
  - Viajaron a Madrid. = "They traveled to Madrid."
  - Llegaron a Madrid. = "They arrived in Madrid."
- It indicates a stationary point on a quantitative scale, as in telling time (but usually not a spatial location, which is normally expressed by en):
  - Llegaron a las dos. = "They arrived at two o'clock."
  - Se venden a dos dólares la libra. = "They are sold at two dollars a pound."
- It introduces infinitives after several common verbs, including ir ("to be going to [do something]", a periphrastic future), volver ("to [do something] again"), comenzar, empezar (both "to begin"), ayudar ("to help"), aprender ("to learn"), and enseñar ("to teach"):
  - Voy a enfadarme. = "I am going to become angry."
  - Aprende no sólo a hablar sino también a escribir el castellano. = "Do not just learn to speak Spanish, but also to write it", "Learn not just to speak, but also to write Spanish."
- It introduces a direct object referring either to a person or a personalised thing (pet, organization, vehicle). This is an example of differential object marking:
  - Veo a María. = "I see María."
  - Te quieren ver a ti. = "They want to see you."
- It introduces indirect objects that Latin would have marked with the dative case:
  - Le envié la carta a Ana. = "I sent Ana the letter", "I sent the letter to Ana."
  - ¿Les regalaste el coche a tus padres? = "Did you give your parents the car as a gift?", "Did you give the car to your parents (as a gift)?"
  - Note that the indirect object pronoun forms le and les appear, even when the indirect object is given in full; see Spanish pronouns.
- The preposition a is a component of many compound prepositions, detailed in Section 2.

Prepositional contraction: al (“to the”, “to”) is the contraction formed with a and el (“the”), the masculine definite article, yet the contraction is waived when the article is part of a proper noun:

- Voy al país de mis sueños = "I am going to the country of my dreams."
- Lo voy a mandar a El País = "I am going to send it to [the newspaper] El País.” (compare, eg, in English "Do 'not to be released' records have a copyright date?" is never contracted to "Don't to be released' records have a copyright date?")

=== ante ===
Ante could indicate that something or someone faces a situation or an effect. For example (not tangible): Ante tal dificultad, optó por rendirse means: "Facing such difficulty, (he or she) opted to give up." A tangible example: El artista hizo una caravana ante la audiencia which means: "The artist bowed for (in front of) the audience."

=== con ===
Con is usually translated as "with", both in the sense of accompaniment (con mi hermano, "with my brother") and in the instrumental sense (con un martillo, "with a hammer"). Unlike other prepositions, con combines with the prepositional pronouns mí, ti, and sí in the forms conmigo (“with me”), contigo (“with you”), and consigo (“with her-, himself”). These forms are derived historically from forms with the Latin preposition cum postposed to its object: mēcum, tēcum, etc. In an Ibero-Romance ancestor of Spanish, before the time of written records, an etymologically redundant con was prefixed to these forms. Compare the concept of inflected preposition.

- Ven conmigo y con él ahora = "Come with me and him now."
- Iré a la fiesta contigo = "I will go to the party with you."
- Es raro llevar un billete de 200€ consigo = "It is unusual to carry a €200 note on oneself."

=== de ===
De is the most frequent preposition in Spanish, and vies with que to be the most frequent word in the language. It is most often translated in English by "of" or "from", but also denotes several other relationships as well.

- Es la más famosa de todas = "She is the most famous [one] of all [of them]."
- Soy de Madrid = "I am from Madrid."

The English possessive with apostrophe-s is translated by a construction with de:

- La hermana de David = "David's sister."
- Ese libro es del profesor = "That book is the teacher's."

Prepositional contraction: When de is followed by the masculine singular definite article el (“the”), together they form the contraction del (“of the”). However, de does not contract with the homophonous personal pronoun él ("him"), nor, in writing, with a proper noun; thus:

- Soy pariente del alcalde de El Escorial, "I am a relative of the mayor of El Escorial."
- Soy pariente de él, "I am a relative of his."

Typography: the uppercase form DE was configured as the siglum Đ — a typographic ligature adopted as a concise written and printed word-character, that originated as a lapidary scribal abbreviation.

The preposition de is part of many compound prepositions, such as dentro de (“within”, “inside of”) and en contra de (“against . . .”); see Section 2, below, for fuller description.

=== por and para ===
Both por and para are frequently translated into English as "for", and thus they pose a challenge for English-speaking learners of Spanish. In the broadest terms, por denotes cause or stimulus (with a retrospective focus), while para denotes destination or purpose (with a prospective focus). The following are common uses of these prepositions:

por

- "somewhere in", a diffuse location in space or time:
  Lo perdí por ahí. = "I lost it thereabout, somewhere around there."
- "in exchange for, in place of"
  Cambié mis euros por dólares. = "I exchanged my euros into dollars."
- "per" (day, hour, mile, etc.)
  Pagan cincuenta euros por hora. = "They pay fifty euros per hour."
- "by means of", "by way of"
  Es más rápido por la autopista. = "It is faster by the motorway."
- "because of" (compare porque, "because")
  Me multaron por exceso de velocidad. = "They fined me for speeding."
  Mi jefe está enfermo y por eso tengo que trabajar = "My boss is sick, and therefore I have to work."
- "for the sake of", "for the benefit of"
  Todo lo que hago, lo hago por ti. = "Everything I do, I do [it] for you."
- "in favor of"
  Yo voto por el partido centrista. = "I vote for the centrist party."
- "by" (the agent of a passive construction)
  La nueva ley fue mal redactada por el partido gobernante = "The new law was badly written by the governing party."
- "for" (a period of time; often replaced by durante)
  Vivieron en Nueva York por tres meses. = "They lived in New York for three months."

para

- "intended for" (a purpose or recipient); "so that" (with a clause of purpose)
  dinero para pagar el café = "money to pay for coffee"
  Estas flores son para ti. = "These flowers are for you."
  Lo lavé para que lo guardaras. = "I washed it so you could keep it."
- "toward" (a destination; informal, replaces a and hacia)
  Voy para el sur. = "I am going [to the] south."
- "by" (a certain time)
  Para esta época del año siempre llueve. = "By this time of the year, it always rains."
- "in order to"
  Fuimos a la tienda para comprar tortillas. = "We went to the store to buy tortillas."
- "for, considering that..." (to express a comparison)
  Para una persona tan joven, se queja demasiado. = "For such a young person, he complains too much."
- "about to" (in the expression estar para, "to be about to [do something]")
  Yo estaba para salir, cuando sonó el teléfono = "I was about to leave, when the telephone rang."

In fast spoken language, the preposition para often is clipped to pa/pa’, as in the colloquial Amos pa’lante. (“Let’s go forward.”)—compare the standard Vamos para adelante. (“Let us go forward.")

=== según ===
Según translates as "according to". With some uses of según, part or all of the object of the preposition is omitted and merely implied. Often the missing words can be taken as lo que ("what"):

- Según dice, es un buen libro. "According to what he says (according to him), it is a good book."
- Según convenga. "As may be required."

Popular speech uses it alone, as an equivalent of "It depends."

- Q: ¿Te gusta el cine francés? ("Do you like French cinema?")

A: Según. ("It depends.")

Regional colloquial usage of the preposition según, with que, expresses evidential mood, indicating hearsay or non-commitment ("supposedly", "it is said").

- Según que tiene SIDA. "They say that he has AIDS."

=== sin ===
Sin translates as "without":

- Un té sin leche, por favor = "A tea without milk, please."
- Se metió en la cama sin despertarla = "He got in bed without waking her."

When the object of the preposition sin is a clause introduced by que (alternatively interpreted as a compound conjunction, sin que), the verb in the clause must be in the subjunctive mood:

- Se metió en la cama sin que se despertara = "He got in bed without her waking up."
- No se puede poner a esos niños en la misma habitación sin que se peleen. = "You cannot put those children in the same room without their fighting."
- Los ladrones entraron sin que los notase nadie = "The thieves entered without anyone noticing them."

== Compound prepositions ==
Some compound prepositions duplicate the meaning of a simple preposition, but often with a more formal tone or with greater specificity. For example, de acuerdo con ("in accordance with") is equivalent to según ("according to"). En dirección a ("in the direction of") is more ponderous than hacia ("toward"). The English counterpart of Spanish en may be either "on" or "in", while dentro de specifies "within". "Because of" is only one of several possible meanings of por, but por causa de conveys that meaning exclusively. In some cases the compound preposition denotes a literal spatial relationship, while the corresponding simple preposition expresses a figurative version of that relationship: thus, debajo de una mesa ("under a table") vs. bajo un régimen ("under a regime"), or delante de un edificio ("in front of a building") vs. ante un tribunal ("before a court of law").

The list of compound prepositions is much longer than that of the simple ones, and only some representative examples are listed here.

Spanish compound prepositions can be composed of:

- a preposition + noun + preposition:
  - por causa de / a causa de / en razón de = "because of"
  - sin perjuicio de = "notwithstanding", "without prejudice to"
  - con respecto a = "with respect to", "regarding"
  - a favor de = "in favour of"
  - en contra de = "against . . ." (e.g. en mi contra, en tu contra, en su contra, etc.)
  - en lugar de / en vez de = "instead of", "in lieu of"
  - etc.
- or of an adverb + preposition:
  - después de = "after"
  - debajo de = "beneath", “underneath”
  - antes de = "before" (i.e. “prior to”)
  - junto a = "beside", "alongside"
  - delante de = "in front of" and “[positioned] before”
  - etc.

Other Spanish compound prepositions include the following:

- tras de = "behind"
- a fuerza de = "by dint of"
- junto a = "next to"
- encima de = "above"
- detrás de = "behind"
- en medio de = "in the middle of"
- en pos de = "in pursuit of"
- con rumbo a = "headed for"
- con destino a = "on the way to"
- a través de = "across"

== Serial prepositions ==
In certain cases, Spanish prepositions can be used serially, that is, two—or occasionally even three—in succession, as in the following examples:

=== a por ===
In Spain the sequence a por, used mainly with verbs of movement, such as ir and salir, can be used to mean "in search of", or "to go fetch [something]". Many speakers consider it to be incorrect and prefer to replace it with por alone, but according to the Real Academia Española, there is no normative reason to condemn the use of a por. In some contexts, a por expresses a clearer meaning than por:

- Subí por la escalera = "I went up the stairs" or "I went up the ladder"
- Subí a por la escalera = "I went up for the ladder"

=== para con ===
This compound means "toward" in the context of an attitude or demeanor toward someone or something:

- Es muy generoso para con los necesitados = "He is very generous toward/with the needy".
- No tengo pruritos para con ellos = "I have nothing against them".

Other possible serial combinations of prepositions include the following:

- por en medio de = "through the midst of"
- por delante de = "somewhere in front of"

== Translating English postpositions into Spanish ==
The English language features three types of adpositions, prepositions (preceding), postpositions (following), and circumpositions (enclosing), which allow constructions such as “in the box”, “on the airplane”, and “out of Africa”, as in Spanish. However, the postposition “three years ago” is as impossible in Spanish usage as “ago three years” is in English. Thus, Spanish prepositions function exclusively as such, and these examples express equivalent concepts by using other mechanisms:

- Hace tres años = “three years ago” (“It makes three years.”)
- Dentro de tres años = “three years hence” (“Within [a period] of three years.”)
- A tres kilómetros = “three kilometres away” (“To/Some three kilometres [from here].”)
