= Scottish Gaelic grammar =

This article describes the grammar of the Scottish Gaelic language.

== Grammar overview ==
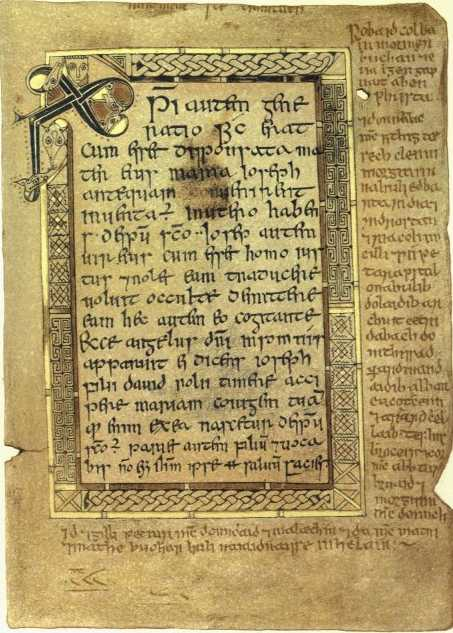
The 10th-century Book of Deer contains the oldest known text from Scotland that has distinctly Scottish Gaelic forms, here seen in the margins of a page from the Gospel of Matthew.

Gaelic shares with other Celtic languages a number of interesting typological features:

- Verb–subject–object basic word order in simple sentences with non-periphrastic verbal constructions, a typological characteristic relatively uncommon among the world's languages.
- conjugated prepositions (traditionally called "prepositional pronouns"): complex forms historically derived from the fusion of a preposition + pronoun sequence (see Prepositions below)
- prepositional constructions for expressing possession and ownership (instead of a verb like English have):

Tha taigh agam "I have a house" (lit. "A house is at me")
Tha an cat sin le Iain "Iain owns that cat" (lit. "Is the cat that with Ian")

- emphatic pronouns: Emphatic forms are systematically available in all pronominal constructions (See Pronouns below).

Tha cat agadsa ach tha cù agamsa "You have a cat but I have a dog"

=== Consonant mutations ===
Lenition and slenderisation (also referred to as palatalisation or "i-infection") play a crucial role in Scottish Gaelic grammar.

Lenition (sometimes inaccurately referred to as "aspiration"), as a grammatical process, affects the pronunciation of initial consonants, and is indicated orthographically by the addition of an ⟨h⟩:

- caileag → chaileag "girl"
- beag → bheag "small"
- faca → fhaca "saw"
- snog → shnog "nice"

Lenition is not indicated in writing for words beginning with ⟨l, n, r⟩. Nor does it affect words that begin with either a vowel, or with ⟨sg, sm, sp, st⟩. In most cases, lenition is caused by the presence of particular trigger words to the left (certain determiners, adverbs, prepositions, and other function words). In this article, the leniting effect of such words is indicated, where relevant, by the superscript "+L" (e.g. glè^{+L} "very").

Slenderisation, on the other hand, is a change in the pronunciation of the final consonant of a word, and it is typically indicated by the addition of an ⟨i⟩:

- facal → facail "word"
- balach → balaich "boy"
- òran → òrain "song"
- ùrlar → ùrlair "floor"
- cailleach → caillich "old woman"

In monosyllabic words, slenderisation can cause more complex changes to the vowel:

- ceòl → ciùil "music"
- fiadh → fèidh "deer"
- cas → cois "foot"

Slenderisation usually has no effect on words that end in a vowel (e.g. bàta "boat"), or words whose final consonant is already slender (e.g. sràid "street"). In rare cases, for example in words where a historic silent final consonant is elided in spelling, this may re-appear in the slenderised form, e.g. tlà (< tlàth) usually slenderises to tlàith.

Most cases of slenderisation can be explained historically as the palatalizing influence of a following front vowel (such as -⟨i⟩) in earlier stages of the language. Although this vowel has now disappeared, its effects on the preceding consonant are still preserved. Similarly, lenition of initial consonants was originally triggered by the final vowel of the preceding word, but in many cases, this vowel is no longer present in the modern language.

Many word-final consonants have also disappeared in the evolution of Scottish Gaelic, and some traces of them can be observed in the form of prosthetic or linking consonants (⟨n-, h-, t-⟩, etc.) that appear in some syntactic combinations, for example, after some determiners (see below).

== Nouns ==
=== Gender and number ===
Inflection of cù ('dog') in singular, dual (with the number dà), and plural

Gaelic nouns and pronouns belong to one of two grammatical genders: masculine or feminine. Nouns with neuter gender in Old Gaelic were redistributed between the masculine and feminine.

The gender of a small number of nouns differs between dialects. A very small group of nouns have declensional patterns that suggest mixed gender characteristics. Foreign nouns that are fairly recent loans arguably fall into a third gender class (discussed by Black), if considered in terms of their declensional pattern. It is arguable that feminine gender is under pressure and that the system may be becoming simplified with the feminine paradigms incorporating some typically masculine patterns.

Nouns have three grammatical numbers: singular, dual (vestigially) and plural. Dual forms of nouns are only found after the numeral dà (two), where they are obligatory. The dual form is identical in form to the dative singular; depending on noun class, the dual is therefore either the same in form as the common singular (the nominative-accusative, Class 1 nouns, Class 3 and Class 4 nouns), or have a palatalised final consonant in nouns of Class 2 and Class 5. Plurals are formed in a variety of ways, including suffixation (often involving the suffix -(e)an) and slenderisation. Pluralisation, as in Irish Gaelic and Manx, can vary according to noun class, however on the whole depends on the final sound of the singular form.

Three Grammatical Number Forms: Singular, Dual (Vestigial), Plural
Noun Class	Example	English
1	aon òran, dà òran, trì òrain	one song, two songs, three songs
2	aon uinneag, dà uinneig, trì uinneagan	one window, two windows, three windows
3	aon ghuth, dà ghuth, trì guthan	one voice, two voices, three voices
4	aon bhàta, dà bhàta, trì bàtaichean	one boat, two boats, three boats
5	aon chara, dà charaid, trì càirdean	one friend, two friends, three friends

==== Cardinal numerals ====
For counting, or with numerals that are not followed by a noun, the form is slightly different.

Cardinal counting numerals
Gaelic numeral	English translation
a h-aon	one
a dhà	two
a trì	three
a ceithir	four
a còig	five
a sia	six
a seachd	seven
a h-ochd	eight
a naoidh	nine
a deich	ten
a h-aon deug	eleven
a dhà dheug	twelve

=== Cases ===
Nouns and pronouns in Gaelic have four cases: nominative, vocative, genitive, and dative (or prepositional) case. There is no distinct accusative case form; the nominative is used for both subjects and objects. Nouns can be classified into a number of major declension classes, with a small number of nouns falling into minor patterns or irregular paradigms. Case forms can be related to the base form by suffixation, lenition, slenderisation, or a combination of such changes. See the example paradigms below for further details.

The case system is now under tremendous pressure and speakers exhibit varying degrees of paradigm simplification.

==== Prepositional or dative ====
Nouns in the dative case only occur after a preposition, and never, for example, as the indirect object of a verb.

==== Vocative ====
Nouns in the vocative case are introduced by the particle a^{+L}, which lenites a following consonant, and is elided (and usually not written) before a vowel. The vocative form of feminine singular nouns is otherwise identical to the nominative; additionally, masculine singular nouns are slenderised in the vocative.

- feminine:
  - Màiri → a Mhàiri
  - Anna → (a) Anna
- masculine:
  - Seumas → a Sheumais
  - Aonghas → (a) Aonghais

==== Genitive ====
In the genitive construction, the genitive follows the word it governs: taigh m' athar house my father (genitive) "my father's house".

=== Indefinite and definite ===
Gaelic has no indefinite article. Cù may mean either "dog" or "a dog", and coin may mean either "dogs" or "some dogs."

The definite article is discussed below in full under articles. A noun or noun phrase is considered to be definite if it fulfils one of the following criteria.

- It is a proper noun
  - Màiri "Mary"
  - Inbhir Nis "Inverness"
  - Alba "Scotland"
- It is preceded by an article
  - an cù "the dog"
  - na h-aibhnichean "the rivers"
- It is preceded by a possessive determiner
  - mo cheann "my head"
  - àirde mo chinn "at the top of my voice"

== Pronouns ==
=== Personal pronouns ===
Gaelic has singular and plural personal pronouns (i.e., no dual forms). Gender is distinguished only in the 3rd person singular. A T-V distinction is found in the 2nd person, with the plural form sibh used also as a polite singular.

Person			Pronoun		English
Person			Simple	Emphatic	English
Singular	1st		mi	mise	I, me
Singular	2nd	Familiar	thu tu	thusa tusa	you
Singular	2nd	Respectful	sibh	sibhse	you
Singular	3rd	Masculine	e	esan	he, him
Singular	3rd	Feminine	i	ise	she, her
Plural	1st		sinn	sinne	we, us
Plural	2nd		sibh	sibhse	you
Plural	3rd		iad	iadsan	they, them

In most cases the Classical Gaelic lenited form of tu, i.e. thu, has become generalised. Tu is retained in constructions where it is preceded by a verb ending in -⟨n⟩ -⟨s⟩ or -⟨dh⟩ (incl. historic -⟨dh⟩):

- Is tu a rinn a' mhocheirigh! "You are an early riser!"
- Bu tu an gaisgeach! "What a hero you were!" (In older Gaelic bu was written and pronounced budh)
- Mun abradh tu “deas-dé.” "Before you could say Jack Robinson."
- Cuiridh tu an-seo e! "You will put it here!"

==== Emphatic personal pronouns ====
The emphatic pronouns are used to express emphasis or contrast:

- Tha i bòidheach "She's beautiful"
- Tha ise bòidheach "She's beautiful (as opposed to somebody else)"

Emphatic forms are found in all pronominal constructions:

- an taigh aicese "her house"
- chuirinn-sa "I would put"
- na mo bheachd-sa "in my opinion"

== Adjectives ==
Adjectives in Gaelic inflect according to gender and case in the singular. In the plural, a single form is used for both masculine and feminine genders, in all cases (although it may be lenited depending on the context).

Adjectives normally follow the noun they modify, and agree with it in gender, number and case. In addition, in the dative singular of masculine nouns, the leniting effect of a preceding definite article (see Articles below) can be seen on both the noun and the following adjective:

- (air) breac mòr "(on) a big trout"
- (air) a' bhreac mhòr "(on) the big trout"

A small number of adjectives precede the noun, and generally cause lenition. For example:

- seann chù "old dog"
- droch shìde "bad weather"
- deagh thidsear "good teacher"

== Determiners ==
=== Possessive determiners ===
Gaelic uses possessive determiners (corresponding to my, your, their, etc.) differently from English. In Gaelic, possessive determiners are used mostly to indicate inalienable possession, for example for body parts or family members.

As indicated in the following table, some possessive determiners lenite the following word. Before a word beginning with a vowel, some of the determiners have elided forms, or require a linking consonant.

Person			Determiner		Examples	
Person			before consonant	before vowel	Examples	
Singular	1st		mo^{+L}	m'	mo mhàthair, m' athair	my mother, my father
Singular	2nd	Familiar	do^{+L}	d'	do mhàthair, d' athair	your mother, your father
Singular	2nd	Respectful	ur	ur n-	ur màthair, ur n-athair	your mother, your father
Singular	3rd	Masculine	a^{+L}	a	a mhàthair, (a) athair	"his mother", "his father"
Singular	3rd	Feminine	a	a h-	a màthair, a h-athair	her mother, her father
Plural	1st		ar	ar n-	ar màthair, ar n-athair	our mother, our father
Plural	2nd		ur	ur n-	ur màthair, ur n-athair	your mother, your father
Plural	3rd		an/am	an	am màthair, an athair	their mother, their father

The 3rd plural possessive a takes the form am before words beginning with a labial consonant: ⟨b, p, f, m⟩.

As discussed above, the linking consonants n- and h- reflect the presence of a final consonant that has disappeared in other contexts. Ar and ur are derived from genitive plural forms that originally ended in a nasal. The feminine singular a derives from a form ending in final -⟨s⟩, whose only trace is now the prefixation of h- to a following vowel.

To refer to non-permanent possession, one uses the preposition aig, as described above:

- am faclair aice her dictionary (lit. the dictionary at her)
- an leabhar aca their book (lit. the book at them)

==== Emphatic suffixes with possessive determiners ====
Emphatic suffixes are used with possessive determiners, and other parts of speech, to lend emphatic or contrastive power. They are used following nouns preceded by possessive pronouns to emphasize the pronominal element. Notice that -sa replaces -se in the first person singular in comparison to the pronominal emphatic suffixes above.

Person			Emphatic suffix	Example	English
Singular	1st		[noun]-sa	mo làmh-sa	my hand
Singular	2nd	Familiar	[noun]-sa	do cheann-sa	your head
Singular	2nd	Respectful	[noun]-se	ur n-aodann-se	your face
Singular	3rd	Masculine	[noun]-san	a uileann-san	his elbow
Singular	3rd	Feminine	[noun]-se	a co-ogha-se	her cousin
Plural	1st		[noun]-ne	ar n-ogha-ne	our grandchild
Plural	2nd		[noun]-se	ur teaghlach-se	your family
Plural	3rd		[noun]-san	am baile-san	their town

=== Articles ===
Gaelic has a definite article but no indefinite article:

- taigh "(a) house"
- an taigh "the house"

The singular article is often used to designate an entire class.

- am bradan "salmon"
- an t-each "horses"
- am feur "grass"

Abstract nouns consistently take the singular article, as well.

- an aois "age"
- an sgìos "tiredness"
- am blàs "warmth"

The form of the (definite) article depends on the number, gender, case of the noun. The following table shows the basic paradigm, as used when there is no assimilation to the initial sounds of the following word.

	Singular		Plural
	Masculine	Feminine	Plural
Nom.	AN	AN^{+L}	NA
Dat.	AN^{+L}		NA
Gen.	AN^{+L}	NA	NAN

The superscript ⟨^{+L}⟩ indicates that the following word is lenited. The actual realization of the capitalised forms in the paradigm above depends on the initial sound of the following word, as explained in the following table:

used in:	masc. nom. sing.	
AN	an t-	before vowel
AN	am	before ⟨b, f, m, p⟩
AN	an	elsewhere
used in:	fem. nom. & dat. sing., masc. dat. & gen. sing.	
AN^{+L}	a'^{+L}	before ⟨b, m, p, c, g⟩
AN^{+L}	an^{+L}	before ⟨f⟩
AN^{+L}	an t-	before ⟨s⟩ + vowel, ⟨sl, sn, sr⟩
AN^{+L}	an	elsewhere (before ⟨d, n, t, l, r, sg, sm, sp, st⟩, vowel)
used in:	fem. gen. sing., nom. & dat. plural	
NA	na	before consonant
NA	na h-	before vowel
used in:	gen. plural	
NAN	nam	before ⟨b, f, m, p⟩
NAN	nan	elsewhere

Putting all of those variants together into one table:

Before:			⟨b, m, p⟩	⟨c, g⟩	⟨f⟩	⟨s⟩ + vowel, ⟨sl, sn, sr⟩	⟨d, n, t, l⟩, ⟨r⟩, ⟨sg, sm, sp, st⟩	vowel	all else
Nom.	Singular	Masculine	am	an	am	an	an	an t-	an
Nom.	Singular	Feminine	a'^{+L}	a'^{+L}	an^{+L}	an t-	an	an	an^{+L}
Nom.	Plural		na	na	na	na	na	na h-	na
Dat.	Singular	Masculine	a'^{+L}	a'^{+L}	an^{+L}	an t-	an	an	an^{+L}
Dat.	Singular	Feminine	a'^{+L}	a'^{+L}	an^{+L}	an t-	an	an	an^{+L}
Dat.	Plural		na	na	na	na	na	na h-	na
Gen.	Singular	Masculine	a'^{+L}	a'^{+L}	an^{+L}	an t-	an	an	an^{+L}
Gen.	Singular	Feminine	na	na	na	na	na	na h-	na
Gen.	Plural		nam	nan	nam	nan	nan	nan	nan

The forms of the definite article trace back to a Common Celtic stem *sindo-, sindā-. The initial ⟨s⟩, already lost in the Old Irish period, is still preserved in the forms of some prepositions (for example le "with" becomes leis before an article, similarly (ann) an "in", becomes anns — see below). The original d can be seen in the form an t-, and the leniting effect of the form an^{+L} is a trace of a lost final vowel. The form na h- reflects an original final -⟨s⟩.

== Example paradigms ==
The following examples illustrate a number of nominal declension patterns, and show how the definite article combines with different kinds of nouns.

=== Masculine definite noun paradigms ===
begins with ⟨c, g⟩:
cat "cat"	Sing.	Plural
Nom.	an cat	na cait
Dat.	a' chat	na cait
Gen.	a' chait	nan cat
Voc.	a chait	a chata

begins with ⟨b, m, p⟩:
balach "boy"	Sing.	Plural
Nom.	am balach	na balaich
Dat.	a' bhalach	na balaich
Gen.	a' bhalaich	nam balach
Voc.	a bhalaich	a bhalacha

begins with a vowel:
òran "song"	Sing.	Plural
Nom.	an t-òran	na h-òrain
Dat.	an òran	na h-òrain
Gen.	an òrain	nan òran
Voc.	òrain	òran

begins with ⟨d, n, t, l, r⟩:
rud "thing"	Sing.	Plural
Nom.	an rud	na rudan
Dat.	an rud	na rudan
Gen.	an ruid	nan rudan
Voc.	a ruid	a ruda

begins with ⟨f⟩:
fiadh "deer"	Sing.	Plural
Nom.	am fiadh	na fèidh
Dat.	an fhiadh	na fèidh
Gen.	an fhèidh	nam fiadh
Voc.	fhèidh	fhiadha

begins with ⟨s, sl, sn, sr⟩:
seòmar "room"	Sing.	Plural
Nom.	an seòmar	na seòmraichean
Dat.	an t-seòmar	na seòmraichean
Gen.	an t-seòmair	nan seòmraichean
Voc.	a sheòmair	a sheòmraiche

=== Feminine definite noun paradigms ===
begins with ⟨c, g⟩:
caileag "girl"	Sing.	Plural
Nom.	a' chaileag	na caileagan
Dat.	a' chaileag	na caileagan
Gen.	na caileig(e)	nan caileagan

begins with ⟨b, m, p⟩:
pìob "pipe"	Sing.	Plural
Nom.	a' phìob	na pìoban
Dat.	a' phìob	na pìoban
Gen.	na pìoba	nam pìob(an)

begins with a vowel:
abhainn "river"	Sing.	Plural
Nom.	an abhainn	na h-aibhnichean
Dat.	an abhainn	na h-aibhnichean
Gen.	na h-aibhne	nan aibhnichean

begins with ⟨d, n, t, l, r⟩:
lèine "shirt"	Sing.	Plural
Nom.	an lèine	na lèintean
Dat.	an lèine	na lèintean
Gen.	na lèine	nan lèintean

begins with ⟨f⟩:
fìdheall "fiddle"	Sing.	Plural
Nom.	an fhìdheall	na fìdhlean
Dat.	an fhìdheall	na fìdhlean
Gen.	na fidhle	nam fidhlean

begins with ⟨s, sl, sn, sr⟩:
sràid "street"	Sing.	Plural
Nom.	an t-sràid	na sràidean
Dat.	an t-sràid	na sràidean
Gen.	na sràide	nan sràid(ean)

== Verbs ==
Verbal constructions may make use of synthetic verb forms which are marked to indicate person (the number of such forms is limited), tense, mood, and voice (active, impersonal/passive). Gaelic has very few irregular verbs, conjugational paradigms being remarkably consistent for two verb classes, with the two copular or "be" verbs being the most irregular. In the paradigm of the verb, the majority of verb-forms are not person-marked and independent pronouns are required as in English, Norwegian and other languages. Alongside constructions involving synthetic verb forms, analytic (or 'periphrastic') aspectual constructions are extremely frequently used and in many cases are obligatory (compare English "be + -ing" and Spanish "estar + [verb]-ndo" verbal constructions). These structures convey tense, aspect and modality, often in fused forms.

'Verbal nouns' play a crucial role in the verbal system, being used in periphrastic verbal constructions preceded by a preposition where they act as the sense verb, and a stative verb conveys tense, aspect and mood information, in a pattern that is familiar from other Indo-European languages. Verbal nouns are true nouns in morphology and inherent properties, having gender, case and their occurrence in what are prepositional phrases, and in which non-verbal nouns are also found. Verbal nouns carry verbal semantic and syntactic force in such core verbal constructions as a result of their meaning content, as do other nouns found in such constructions, such as tha e na thost "he is quiet, he stays silent", literally "he is in his silence", which mirrors the stative usage found in tha e na shuidhe "he is sitting, he sits", literally "he is in his sitting". This is similar to words such as bed in English and letto in Italian when used in prepositional phrases such as in bed and a letto "in bed", where "bed" and letto express a stative meaning. The verbal noun covers many of the same notions as infinitives, gerunds and present participles in other Indo-European languages.

Traditional grammars use the terms 'past', 'future tense', 'conditional', 'imperative' and 'subjunctive' in describing the five core Scottish Gaelic verb forms; however, modern scholarly linguistic texts reject such terms borrowed from traditional grammar descriptions based on the concepts of Latin grammar. In a general sense, the verb system is similar to that found in Irish, the major difference being the loss of the simple present, this being replaced by the periphrastic forms noted above. These periphrastic forms in Irish have retained their use of showing continuous aspect. The tense–aspect system of Gaelic is ill-studied; Macaulay (1992) gives a reasonably comprehensive account.

=== Copula verbs ===
The number of copular verbs and their exact function in Gaelic is a topic of contention among researchers. There is a certain amount of variation in sources, making it difficult to come to a definitive conclusion about certain aspects of copular verbs. However, there is some information that consistently shows up across these sources, covered in this section.

Gaelic has two copular "be" verbs, though some grammar books treat them as two parts of a single suppletive verb:

Bi: attributes a property to a noun or pronoun; its complement is typically a description that expresses position, state, non-permanent characteristic (see further below)

Tense		form
Present	Independent	tha
Present	Relative	a tha
Present	Dependent	bheil, eil
Present imperfective, future	Independent	bidh, bithidh
Present imperfective, future	Relative	a bhios
Present imperfective, future	Dependent	bi
Past perfective	Independent	bha
Past perfective	Dependent	robh
Past imperfective		bhiodh

Is: Historically called the “copula” verb, is can be used in constructions with nominal complements and adjectival complements. It also has the additional function of “topicalization”, a term that means a certain element of a sentence is being emphasized as the topic of interest.

Tense		form
Present	Independent	is, ’s
Present	Relative	as
Past		bu, before a vowel and ⟨fh⟩: b’

Is:

In English, italics (for text) and stress (for speech) are used to emphasize different elements of a sentence; one can also change the word order to put the emphasized element first. Scottish Gaelic, however, does not use stress and very rarely uses word order changes to create emphasis. Instead, it uses topicalization, for example when “a sentence with the verb is followed by the element topicalised” (MacAulay, 189). This equates the English fronting device "it is X that...":

Examples (from MacAulay, pages 189–190):

Is e Iain a thug an leabhar do Anna {an-dè}
is 3SG-MASC-PN Ian REL gave the book to Anna yesterday
"It is Ian who gave the book to Anna yesterday."

Is e an leabhar a thug Iain do Anna {an-dè}
is 3SG-MASC-PN the book REL gave Ian to Anna yesterday
"It is the book that Ian gave to Anna yesterday."

Is ann do Anna a thug Iain an leabhar {an-dè}
is in-it to Anna REL gave Ian the book yesterday
"It is to Anna that Ian gave the book yesterday."

Is ann {an-dè} a thug Iain an leabhar do Anna
is in-it yesterday REL gave Ian the book to Anna
"It was yesterday that Ian gave the book to Anna."

Is ann a’ toirt an leabhair do Anna a bha Iain
is in-it at giving-VN the book-GEN to Anna REL was Ian
"It was giving the book to Anna that Ian was."

The fronting use of is is part of its general function of ascribing descriptions to a complement (see below). Most commonly one will see classificatory or adjectival complements, as shown below:

Is duine Iain
is man Ian
"Ian is a man."

Is math sin!
is good that
"That is good!"

Bi: Historically called the “substantive” verb, tha (the present indicative independent 3rd person singular form of bi) can be used in constructions with adjectival complements, locative predicates, and in aspectually marked sentences (MacAulay, page 180).

Examples (MacAulay, page 178):

Tha an càr mòr
is the car large
"The car is large."

Tha an càr air an rathad
is the car on the road
"The car is on the road."

Tha an càr a’ siubhal
is the car at travelling
"The car is travelling."

It is also possible to use tha to describe a noun or pronoun with a nominal complement by using an embedded pronoun (MacAulay, page 179):

Tha Iain na shaighdear
is Ian {in.3SG.MASC.PN (in-his; for convenience)} soldier
"Ian is a soldier."

Is saighdear Iain
is soldier Ian
"Ian is a soldier."

The two usages carry a semantic contrast. Is shows a permanent state, while tha shows that the state of being a soldier is temporary in some way or other. Often the tha construction is used when someone has just become a soldier, for example, while the is construction shows that being a soldier is a part of Ian's persona.

Notice that the example using is exhibits a diversion from the typical VSO word order. In Classical Gaelic, is incorporates the subject (3rd person singular), the noun or adjective that follows is in the nominative, and the second noun/pronoun is objective in case. In Modern Gaelic, this has been reanalysed as V – Topic/Complement – S, or V – S – S, a "double nominative construction", as it were. Latin based descriptions, however, assume the first analysis. The tha example maintains VSO/VSC word order, where the complement is a prepositional phrase that states what state the subject is in (in the state of being a soldier); cf. tha e na shuidhe and tha e na thost above.

The difference between tha and is is that tha describes psychologically temporary states:

tha mi sgìth "I am tired"
tha an duine reamhair "the man is fat"

Is, on the other hand, describes more permanent conditions — that is, states of being that are intrinsic and/or not seen as having an assumed end:

is beag an taigh e "it's a small house"
is Albannach mi "I am Scottish"

In the last example, for instance, if someone were to become a Scottish citizen, the phrase would be :Tha mi nam Albannach a-nise "I am Scottish now".

=== Verb forms, tense and aspect ===
Tense and aspect are marked in Gaelic in a number of ways.

Present tense is formed by use of the verb tha and the verbal noun (or participle) form of the main verb. The construction, unlike Irish Gaelic, is neutral to aspect. Apart from this, tense and aspect marking are very similar in the two languages.

Tha mi a' bruidhinn. "I am speaking" or "I speak" (lit. "Am I at speaking")

The perfective past in regular verbs is indicated by lenition of the initial consonant, and d'/dh addition with verbs that start with a vowel or ⟨f⟩ (do is the underlying form in all cases):

bruidhinn [ˈpri.ɪɲ] "speak": bhruidhinn mi [ˈvri.ɪɲ mi] "I spoke"
òl [ɔːl̪ˠ] "drink": dh'òl mi [ɣɔːl̪ˠ mi] "I drank"
fuirich [ˈfuɾʲɪç] "wait, stay": dh'fhuirich mi [ˈɣuɾʲɪç mi] "I waited/stayed"

Gaelic conjugates verbs to indicate either the present imperfective or the future tense:

bruidhnnidh mi "I speak", "I will speak", "I speak (at times/occasionally/often)".

The habitual continuous and future continuous is expressed by using the habitual verb bi:

Bidh mi a' bruidhinn "I speak (regularly)", "I will be speaking", "I am speaking as a normal habit", etc.

As in other Celtic languages, Scottish Gaelic expresses modality and psych-verbals (such as "like", "prefer", "be able to", "manage to", "must"/"have to", "make"="compel to") by periphrastic constructions involving various adjectives, prepositional phrases and the copula or another verb, some of which involve highly unusual syntactic patterns when compared to English.

== Prepositions and similar words ==
Prepositions in Gaelic govern either the nominative, dative (prepositional), or genitive case.

- with dative:
  - air "on"
  - aig "at"
  - anns/ann an "in"
  - le(is) "with"
  - ri(s) "to"
- with nominative:
  The following originally governed a noun in the accusative; in modern Scottish Gaelic, the accusative has merged with other cases, usually the nominative or dative.
  - eadar "between"
  - gu(s) "until"
  - mar "as"
  - gun "without"
- with genitive:
  - tarsainn "across"
  - ré "during"
  - chùm, "for (the) purpose, reason"
  - trìd "through"
  - timcheall "around"
  The derivation of these is from the following nouns:
  - tarsainn " the bottom of the doorway"
  - ré "time period"
  - trìd is a nominalisation of the Classical Gaelic preposition trí "through" (in Gaelic now pronounced and written tro among other variants).
  - timcheall "surroundings".

All so-called "compound prepositions" consist of a simple preposition and a noun, and therefore the word they refer to is in the genitive case:

- ri taobh a' bhalaich "beside the boy" (lit. "by the boy's side")

Some prepositions have different forms (ending in -⟨s⟩ or -⟨n⟩) when followed by the article. In the case of -⟨s⟩, this is from the original initial ⟨s⟩- of the definite article (Old Irish in, ind from Proto-Celtic *sindos, *sindā, etc.), while the -⟨n⟩ continues the article fused with the preposition, with the article being repeated sometimes in modern Scottish Gaelic (eg. Old Irish fond euch "under the horse", Scottish Gaelic fon each or fon an each, in Classical Gaelic fán eoch):

- le Iain, leis a' mhinistear "with Ian, with the minister"
- fo bhròn, fon bhòrd or fon a' bhòrd "under sorrow, under the table"

=== Inflected prepositions with personal pronouns ===
Prepositions that mark the dative take the conjugated dative forms of the personal pronouns, thus *aig mi "at me" and *le iad "with them" are incorrect. Such prepositions have conjugated forms, like verbs (see Inflected preposition). The following table presents some commonly used paradigms.

+		"me"	"you, sg. fam."	"him"	"her"	"us"	"you, pl."	"them"
+		mi	thu	e	i	sinn	sibh	iad
"at"	aig	agam	agad	aige	aice	againn	agaibh	aca
"on"	air	orm	ort	air	oirre	oirnn	oirbh	orra
"with"	le	leam	leat	leis	leatha	leinn	leibh	leotha
"in"	ann an	annam	annad	ann	innte	annainn	annaibh	annta
"to, for"	do	dhomh	dhut	dha	dhi	dhuinn	dhuibh	dhaibh

==== Emphatic forms ====
Like the personal pronouns, inflected prepositions have emphatic forms derived by adding the following suffixes:

+		sa	sa	san	se	e	se	san
"at"	aig	agamsa	agadsa	aigesan	aicese	againne	agaibhse	acasan
"on"	air	ormsa	ortsa	airsan	oirrese	oirnne	oirbhse	orrasan
"with"	le	leamsa	leatsa	leisan	leathase	leinne	leibhse	leothasan
"in"	ann an	annamsa	annadsa	annsan	inntese	annainne	annaibhse	anntasan
"to, for"	do	dhomhsa	dhutsa	dhasan	dhise	dhuinne	dhuibhse	dhaibhsan

=== Inflected prepositions with possessive determiners ===
When the preposition an "in" (often found in the combined form ann an) is followed by a possessive determiner, the two words create a combined form. This also occurs with ag, the form of aig used with verbal nouns, and a^{+L}. As the last elements of these forms are the possessive determiners, the expected mutations occur.

+		"my"	"your, sg. fam."	"his"	"her"	"our"	"your, pl."	"their"
+		mo	do	a	a	ar	ur	an
"in"	[ann] an	nam^{+L}	nad^{+L}	na^{+L}	na [h-]	nar [n-]	nur [n-]	nan/nam
"at"	ag	gam^{+L}	gad^{+L}	ga^{+L}	ga [h-]	gar [n-]	gur [n-]	gan/gam
"to"	a^{+L}	am^{+L}	ad^{+L}	a^{+L}	a [h-]	ar [n-]	ur [n-]	an/am

==== Emphatic forms ====
The emphatic forms of inflected prepositions based on possessive determiners follows the emphatic forms of the emphatic suffixes with possessive determiners. That is, the suffix is added to the noun following the possessive determiner rather than to the possessive determiner itself.

+		sa	sa	san	se	ne	se	san
"in"	ann an	nam^{+L} {noun}-sa	nad^{+L} {noun}-sa	<na^{+L} {noun}-san	na [h-] {noun}-se	nar [n-] {noun}-ne	nur {noun}-se	nan/nam {noun}-san
"at"	aig	gam^{+L} {noun}-sa	gad^{+L} {noun}-sa	ga^{+L} {noun}-san	ga [h-] {noun}-se	gar [n-] {noun}-ne	gur {noun}-se	gan/gam {noun}-san

Less formally, gam etc can undergo lenition – i.e. gham, ghad etc (sometimes erroneously spelled dham, dhad etc) and there are two n-less variants of nam and nad:

+		sa	sa	san	se	ne	se	san
"at"	aig	gham^{+L} {noun}-sa	ghad^{+L} {noun}-sa	gha^{+L} {noun}-san	gha [h-] {noun}-se	ghar [n-] {noun}-ne	ghur {noun}-se	ghan/gham {noun}-san
"in"	a	'am^{+L} {noun}-sa	'ad^{+L} {noun}-sa					

== References and notes ==
=== Full reference citations ===
- Black, Ronald (1997). Cothrom Ionnsachaidh. Edinburgh: University of Edinburgh, Department of Celtic. ISBN 0-906981-33-6.
- Calder, George (1990) [1923]. A Gaelic Grammar. Glasgow: Gairm. ISBN 978-0-901771-34-6.
- Dwelly, Edward (1988) [1901–11]. The Illustrated Gaelic-English Dictionary (10th ed.). Glasgow: Gairm. ISBN 978-1-871901-28-3.
- Gillies, H. Cameron (2006) [1896]. Elements of Gaelic Grammar. Vancouver: Global Language Press. ISBN 978-1-897367-00-1.
- Lamb, William (2008). Scottish Gaelic Speech and Writing: Register Variation in an Endangered Language. Belfast: Cló Ollscoil na Banríona. ISBN 978-0853898955.
- Lamb, William (2024). Scottish Gaelic: A Comprehensive Grammar. London: Routledge. ISBN 9780367189181
- Lewis, Henry; Holger Pedersen (1989). A Concise Comparative Celtic Grammar (3rd ed.). Göttingen: Vandenhoeck & Ruprecht. ISBN 3-525-26102-0.
- Macaulay, Donald (1992). The Celtic Languages. Cambridge: Cambridge University Press. ISBN 0-521-23127-2.
- Mark, Colin (2006). Gaelic Verbs: Systemised and Simplified (2nd rev. ed.). Glasgow: Steve Savage Publishers Limited. ISBN 978-1-904246-13-8.
- Ó Maolalaigh, Roibeard; Iain MacAonghuis (1997). Scottish Gaelic in Three Months. Hugo's Language Books. ISBN 978-0-85285-234-7.
- Thurneysen, Rudolf (1998) [1946]. A Grammar of Old Irish. Translated by D. A. Binchy and Osborn Bergin. Dublin: Dublin Institute for Advanced Studies. ISBN 1-85500-161-6.

== See also ==
- Old Irish
