= Tigrinya grammar =

Grammar of the Semitic language

This article describes the grammar of Tigrinya, a South Semitic language which is spoken primarily in Eritrea and Ethiopia, and is written in Ge'ez script.

== Nouns ==
=== Gender ===
Like other Afro-Asiatic languages, Tigrinya has two grammatical genders, masculine and feminine, and all nouns belong to either one or the other. Grammatical gender in Tigrinya enters into the grammar in the following ways:

- Verbs agree with their subjects in gender (unless the subject is first person).
- Second and third person personal pronouns (you, he, she, they, etc. in English) are distinguished by gender.
- Adjectives and determiners agree with the nouns they modify in gender.

Some noun pairs for people distinguish masculine and feminine by their endings, with the feminine signaled by t. These include agent nouns derived from verbs — ከፈተ käfätä 'open', ከፋቲ käfati 'opener (m.)', ከፋቲት käfatit 'opener (f.)' — and nouns for nationalities or natives of particular regions — ትግራዋይ tǝgraway 'Tigrean (m.)', ትግራወይቲ tǝgrawäyti 'Tigrean (f.)'.

Grammatical gender normally agrees with natural gender for people and animals; thus nouns such as ኣቦ ’abbo 'father', ወዲ wäddi 'son, boy', and ብዕራይ bǝ‘ǝray 'ox' are masculine, while nouns such as ኣደ addä 'mother', ጓል gʷal 'daughter, girl', and ላም lam or ላሕሚ lah.mi 'cow' are feminine. However, most names for animals do not specify biological gender, and the words ተባዕታይ täba‘tay 'male' and ኣንስተይቲ anǝstäyti must be placed before the nouns if the gender is to be indicated.

The gender of most inanimate nouns is not predictable from the form or the meaning. Grammars sometimes disagree on the genders of particular nouns; for example, ጸሓይ ṣäḥay 'sun' is masculine according to Leslau, feminine according to Amanuel. This disagreement seems to be due to dialectal differences.

=== Number ===
Tigrinya has singular and plural number, but nouns that refer to multiple entities are not obligatorily plural. That is, if the context is clear, a formally singular noun may refer to multiple entities: ሓሙሽተ ḥammuštä 'five', ሰብኣይ säb’ay 'man', ሓሙሽተ ሰብኡት ḥammuštä säbut, 'five men'. It is also possible for a formally singular noun to appear together with plural agreement on adjectives or verbs: ብዙሓት bǝzuḥat 'many (pl.)', ዓዲ ‘addi 'village'; ብዙሓት ዓዲ bǝzuḥat ‘addi 'many villages'. The conventions for when this combination of singular and plural is or is not possible appear to be complex.

As in Arabic, Tigre, and Ge'ez, noun plurals are formed both through the addition of suffixes to the singular form ("external" plural) and through the modification of the pattern of vowels within (and sometimes outside) the consonants that make up the noun root ("internal" or "broken" plural). In some cases suffixes may also be added to an internal plural. The most common patterns are as follows. In the designation of internal plural patterns, "C" represents one of the consonants of the noun root. Note that some nouns (for example, ዓራት ‘arat 'bed') have more than one possible plural.

External plural
-at, -tat
- ዓራት ‘arat 'bed', ዓራታት(ዓራውቲ) ‘aratat 'beds'
- እምባ ǝmba 'mountain', እምባታት ǝmbatat 'mountains'
-ot (following deletion of -a or -ay)
- ጐይታ gʷäyta 'master', ጐይቶት gʷäytot 'masters'
- ሐረስታይ ḥarästay 'farmer', ሐረስቶት ḥarästot 'farmers'
-ǝtti, -wǝtti (sometimes with deletion of final -t)
- ገዛ gäza 'house', ገዛውቲ gäzawǝtti 'houses'
- ዓራት ‘arat 'bed', ዓራውቲ ‘arawǝtti 'beds'
Internal plural
’aCCaC
- ፈረስ färäs 'horse', አፍራሰ ’afras 'horses'
- እዝኒ ’ǝzni 'ear', እእዛን ’a’zan 'ears'
’aCaCǝC
- ንህቢ nǝhbi 'bee', አናህብ ’anahǝb 'bees'
- በግዕ bäggǝ‘ 'sheep' (s.), አባጊዕ ’abagǝ‘ 'sheep' (p.)
CäCaCu
- ደርሆ därho 'chicken', ደራሁ därahu 'chickens'
- ጕሒላ gʷǝḥila 'thief', ጕሓሉ(?) gʷǝḥalu 'thieves'
C{ä,a}CaCǝC
- መንበር mänbär 'chair', መናብር mänabǝr 'chairs'
- ሐርማዝ ḥarmaz 'elephant', ሐራምዝ ḥaramǝz 'elephants'
...äCti for the plural of agent and instrument nouns derived from verbs
- ቀላቢ k'ällabi 'feeder', ቀለብቲ k'älläbti 'feeders'
- አገልጋሊ ’agälgali 'server', አገልገልቲ ’agälgälti 'servers'
- መኽደኒ mäxdäni 'cover', መኽደንቲ (?) mäxdänti 'covers'
CǝCawǝCti
- ክዳን kǝdan 'clothing', ክዳውንቲ kǝdawǝnti 'articles of clothing'
- ሕፃን ḥǝs'an 'infant', ሕፃውንቲ ḥǝs'awǝnti 'infants'
CäCaCǝCti
- መጽሓፍ mäs'ḥaf 'book', መጻሕፍቲ mäs'aḥǝfti 'books'
- ኮኸብ koxäb 'star', ከዋኽብቲ käwaxǝbti 'stars'
...C*aC*ǝC..., where "C*" represents a single root consonant
- ወረቐት wäräx'ät 'paper', ወረቓቕቲ wäräx'ax'ti 'papers'
- ተመን tämän 'snake', ተማምን tämamǝn 'snakes'

Among the completely irregular plurals are ሰበይቲ säbäyti 'woman', አንስቲ ’anǝsti 'women' and ጓል gʷal 'girl, daughter', እዋልድ ’awalǝd 'girls, daughters' (alongside ኣጓላት ’agʷalat).

=== Expression of possession, genitive ===
Tigrinya has two ways to express the genitive relationships that are expressed in English using possessives (the city's streets), of phrases (the streets of the city), and noun-noun compounds (city streets).

- Prepositional phrases with the preposition ናይ nay 'of'

- ሐደ ḥadä 'one', ሰብ säb 'person', ቈልዓ kʷ'äl‘a 'child', ናይ ሓደ ሰብ ቈልዓ nay ḥadä säb kʷ'äl‘a 'one person's child', nat can come before and after the possessee
- መስተዋድድ(?) mästäwadǝd 'preposition', ተሰሓቢ tësëḥabi 'object', ናይ መስተዋድድ ተሰሓቢ nay mästäwadǝd täsäḥabi 'object of a preposition'

- Noun-noun constructions, with the "possessor" following the "possessed thing"

- ጓል gʷal 'daughter', ሓወይ ḥawwäy 'my brother', ጓል ሓወይ gʷal ḥawwäy 'my brother's daughter (niece)'
- መዓልቲ mä‘alti 'day', ሓርነት ḥarǝnnät 'freedom', መዓልቲ ሓርነት ኤርትራ mä‘alti ḥarǝnnät ’ertǝra 'Eritrean Liberation Day'

== Pronouns ==
=== Personal pronouns ===
In most languages, there is a small number of basic distinctions of person, number, and often gender that play a role within the grammar of the language. Tigrinya and English are such languages. We see these distinctions within the basic set of independent personal pronouns, for example, English I, Tigrinya ኣነ anä; English she, Tigrinya ንሳ nǝssa. In Tigrinya, as in other Semitic languages, the same distinctions appear in three other places within the grammar of the languages as well.

Subject–verb agreement
All Tigrinya verbs agree with their subjects; that is, the person, number, and (second and third person) gender of the subject of the verb are marked by suffixes or prefixes on the verb. Because the affixes that signal subject agreement vary greatly with the particular verb tense/aspect/mood, they are normally not considered to be pronouns and are discussed elsewhere in this article under verb conjugation.
Object pronoun suffixes
Tigrinya verbs often have additional morphology that indicates the person, number, and (second and third person) gender of the object of the verb.

ንኣልማዝ ርእየያ
nǝ’almaz rǝ’yä-yya
Almaz-ACC I-saw-her
'I saw Almaz'

While suffixes such as -yya in this example are sometimes described as signaling object agreement, analogous to subject agreement, they are more often thought of as object pronoun suffixes because, unlike the markers of subject agreement, they do not vary significantly with the tense/aspect/mood of the verb. For arguments of the verb other than the subject or the object, a separate set of related suffixes have a dative, benefactive, adversative, instrumental, or locative meaning ('to', 'for', 'against', 'with', 'by', 'at').

ንኣልማዝ ማዕጾ ኸፊተላ
nǝ’almaz ma‘s'o xäfitä-lla
for-Almaz door I-opened-for-her
'I opened the door for Almaz'

Suffixes such as -lla in this example will be referred to in this article as prepositional object pronoun suffixes because they correspond to prepositional phrases such as 'for her', to distinguish them from the direct object pronoun suffixes such as -yya 'her'.
Possessive suffixes
Tigrinya has a further set of morphemes that are suffixed to either nouns or prepositions. These signal possession on a noun and prepositional object on a preposition. They will be referred to as possessive suffixes.
- ገዛ gäza 'house', ገዛይ gäza-y 'my house', ገዛኣ gäza-’a 'her house'
- ብዛዕባ bǝza‘ba 'about', ብዛዕባይ bǝza‘ba-y 'about me', ብዛዕብኣ bǝza‘bǝ-’a 'about her'

In each of these four aspects of the grammar, independent pronouns, subject–verb agreement, object-pronoun suffixes, and possessive suffixes, Tigrinya distinguishes ten combinations of person, number, and gender. For first person, there is a two-way distinction between singular ('I') and plural ('we'), whereas for second and third persons, there is a four-way distinction for the four combinations of singular and plural number and masculine and feminine gender ('you m. sg.', 'you f. sg.', 'you m. pl.', 'you f. pl.', 'he', 'she', 'they m.', 'they f.').

Like other Semitic languages, Tigrinya is a pro-drop language. That is, neutral sentences, in which no element is emphasized, normally use the verb conjugation rather than independent pronouns to indicate the subject, and incorporates the object pronoun into the verb: ኤርትራዊ እዩ ’erǝtrawi ’ǝyyu 'he's Eritrean,' ዓዲመያ ‘addimäyya 'I invited her'. The Tigrinya words that translate directly as 'he' and 'I' do not appear in these sentences, while the word 'her' is indicated by the 'a' at the end of the verb (thus, the person, number, and (second or third person) gender of the subject and object are all marked by affixes on the verb). When the subject in such sentences is emphasized, an independent pronoun is used: ንሱ ኤርትራዋይ እዩ nǝssu ’erǝtraway ̈’ǝyyu 'he's Eritrean,' ኣነ ዓዲመያ anǝ ‘addimäyya 'I invited her'. When the object is emphasized, instead of an independent pronoun, the accusative marker nǝ- is used with the appropriate possessive suffix: ንኣኣ ዓዲመያ nǝ’a’a ‘addimäyya 'I invited her'.

The table below shows alternatives for many of the forms. In each case, the choice depends on what precedes the form in question. For the possessive suffixes, the form depends on whether the noun or preposition ends in a vowel or a consonant, for example, ከልበይ kälb-äy 'my dog', ኣዶይ ’addo-y 'my mother'. For the object pronoun suffixes, for most of the forms there is a "light" (non-geminated) and a "heavy" (geminated) variant, a pattern also found in a number of other Ethiopian Semitic languages, including Tigre and the Western Gurage languages. The choice of which variant to use is somewhat complicated; some examples are given in the verb section.

Tigrinya Personal Pronouns
English	Independent	Object pronoun suffixes		Possessive suffixes
English	Independent	Direct	Prepositional	Possessive suffixes
I	ኣነ anä	-(n)ni	-(l)läy	-(ä)y
you (m. sg.)	ንስኻ nǝssǝxa	-(k)ka	-lka	-ka
you (f. sg.)	ንስኺ nǝssǝxi	-(k)ki	-lki	-ki
he	ንሱ nǝssu	-(’)o, (w)wo, yyo		-(’)u
she	ንሳ nǝssa	-(’)a, (w)wa, yya	-(l)la	-(’)a
we	ንሕና nǝḥǝna	-(n)na	-lna	-na
you (m. pl.)	ንስኻትኩም nǝssǝxatkum	-(k)kum	-lkum	-kum
you (f. pl.)	ንስኻትክን nǝssǝxatkǝn	-(k)kǝn	-lkǝn	-kǝn
they (m.)	ንሳቶም nǝssatom	-(’)om, -(w)wom, -yyom	-(l)lom	-(’)om
they (f.)	ንሳተን nǝssatän	-än, -’en, -(w)wän, -yyän	-(l)län	-än, -’en

Within second and third person, there is a set of additional "polite" independent pronouns, for reference to people that the speaker wishes to show respect towards. This usage is an example of the so-called T-V distinction that is made in many languages. The polite pronouns in Tigrinya are just the plural independent pronouns without -xat- or -at: ንስኹም nǝssǝxum 'you m. pol.', ንስኽን nǝssǝxǝn 'you f. pol.', ንሶም nǝssom 'he pol.', ንሰን nǝssän 'she pol.'. Although these forms are most often singular semantically — they refer to one person — they correspond to second or third person plural elsewhere in the grammar, as is common in other T-V systems.

For second person, there is also a set of independent vocative pronouns, used to call the addressee. These are ኣታ atta (m. sg.), ኣቲ atti (f. sg.), ኣቱም attum (m. pl.), ኣተን attän.

For possessive pronouns ('mine', 'yours', etc.), Tigrinya adds the possessive suffixes to nat- (from the preposition nay 'of'): ናተይ natäy 'mine', ናትካ natka 'yours m. sg.', ናትኪ natki 'yours f. sg.', ናታ nata 'hers', etc.

=== Reflexive pronouns ===
For reflexive pronouns ('myself', 'yourself', etc.), Tigrinya adds the possessive suffixes to one of the nouns ርእሲ rǝ’si 'head', ነፍሲ näfsi 'soul', or ባዕሊ ba‘li 'owner': ርእሰይ rǝ’säy / ነፍሰይ näfsäy / ባዕለይ ba‘läy 'myself', ርእሳ rǝ’sa / ነፍሳ näfsa / ባዕላ ba‘la 'herself', etc.

=== Demonstrative pronouns ===
Like English, Tigrinya makes a two-way distinction between near ('this, these') and far ('that, those') demonstrative pronouns and adjectives. Besides singular and plural, as in English, Tigrinya also distinguishes masculine and feminine gender.

Tigrinya Demonstrative Pronouns
Number	Gender	Near	Far
Singular	Masculine	እዚ ǝzi	እቲ ǝti
Singular	Feminine	እዚኣ ǝzi’a	እቲኣ ǝti’a
Plural	Masculine	እዚኦም / እዚኣቶም ǝzi’(at)om	እቲኦም / እቲኣቶም ǝti’(at)om
Plural	Feminine	እዚኤን / እዚኣተን ǝzi’en, ǝzi’atän	እቲኤን / እቲኣተን ǝti’en, ǝti’atän

== Adjectives ==
Tigrinya adjectives may have separate masculine singular, feminine singular, and plural forms, and adjectives usually agree in gender and number with the nouns they modify. The plural forms follow the same patterns as noun plurals; that is, they may be formed by suffixes or internal changes or a combination of the two. Some common patterns relating masculine, feminine and plural forms of adjectives are the following. Note that ä in the patterns becomes a after pharyngeal or glottal consonants (as elsewhere in Tigrinya).

masculine CǝC(C)uC, feminine CǝC(C)ǝCti, plural CǝC(C)uCat

ሕሙም ሕምምቲ ሕሙማት
ḥǝmum ḥǝmǝmti ḥǝmumat
sick-MASC sick-FEM sick-PL

masculine CäCCiC, feminine CäCCaC, plural CäCCäCti or CäCCaCti

ጸሊም ጸላም ጸለምቲ
s'ällim s'ällam s'ällämti
black-MASC black-FEM black-PL

ነዊሕ ነዋሕ ነዋሕቲ
näwwiḥ näwwaḥ näwwaḥti
long-MASC long-FEM long-PL

masculine and feminine the same, plural -(t)at. In the following case, the adjective is formed from adding -"am" to a noun, a feature shared with Amharic

ሃብቲ ሃብታም ሃብታማት
habti habtam habtamat
wealth {} rich

Adjectives modifying plural animate nouns must be plural, but adjectives modifying plural inanimate nouns may be singular:

ጻዕዳ ክዳውንቲ
s'a‘da kǝdawǝnti
white-SG clothes-PL
'white clothes'

However, nouns referring to multiple entities may be singular when the context makes the plurality clear, and these singular nouns may be modified by plural adjectives:

ክልተ ሃብታማት ሰበይቲ
kǝlǝttä habtamat säbäyti
two rich-PL woman
'two rich women'

Adjectives are used less often in Tigrinya than in English. Most adjectives have a corresponding verb that is derived from the same consonantal root, and this verb often appears where English would have an adjective. For example:

ከቢድ → ከበደ
käbbid {} käbädä
{'heavy'} {} {'be, become heavy'}

ሕማቕ → ሓመቐ
ḥǝmmax {} ḥammäx'ä
{'bad'} {} {'be, become bad'}

In particular, an adjective may be replaced by the relative perfect form of the corresponding verb:

ሕማቕ ሰብኣይ
ḥǝmmax' säb’ay
'a bad man'

ዝሓመቐ ሰብኣይ
zǝḥammäx'ä säb’ay
'a bad man' (lit. 'man who became bad')

== Determiners ==
=== Demonstrative adjectives ===
As with the demonstrative pronouns, the Tigrinya demonstrative adjectives divide into expression for near ('this, these') and far ('that, those') referents, with separate forms for the four combinations of singular and plural number and masculine and feminine gender. Like other adjectives, demonstrative adjectives precede the noun, but they are often accompanied by a second copy or slightly modified form that follows the noun. The vowel beginning the form following the noun is often dropped and in writing may then be represented by an apostrophe: እዚ ሰብ'ዚ ǝzi säbzi 'this man'.

Tigrinya Demonstrative Adjectives
Number	Gender	Near	Far
Singular	Masculine	እዚ ǝzi ... (እዚ ǝzi)	እቲ ǝti ... (እቲ ǝti)
Singular	Feminine	እዛ ǝza ... (እዚኣ ǝzi’a)	እታ ǝta ... (እቲኣ ǝti’a)
Plural	Masculine	እዞም ǝzom ... (እዚኦም ǝzi’om)	እቶም ǝtom ... (እቲኦም ǝti’om)
Plural	Feminine	እዘን ǝzän ... (እዚኤን ǝzi’en)	እተን ǝtän ... (እቲኤን ǝti’en)

=== Articles ===
Like other Semitic languages, Tigrinya has no indefinite article (English a), but has a definite article (English the). In Tigrinya, as in Tigre, but unlike in the Southern Ethiopian Semitic languages such as Amharic, this takes the form of a word that appears at the beginning of the noun phrase. The definite article is derived from, and almost identical to, the distal demonstrative adjective (English 'that'), as can be seen in the table below.

Tigrinya Definite Articles
	Singular	Plural
Masculine	እቲ ǝti	እቶም ǝtom
Feminine	እታ ǝta	እተን ǝtän

When the definite article is preceded by the accusative marker/preposition ን nǝ or the preposition ብ bǝ, the vowel sequence ǝ+ǝ merges into the vowel ä: በቲ መጋዝ bäti mägaz 'with the saw'. After other prepositions, the initial vowel of the article is often dropped: ካብቲ እተሓደረሉ ቦታ kabti ǝttäḥadärällu bota 'from the place where he spent the night'.

== Verbs ==
In Tigrinya, as in other Semitic languages, a verb is a complex object, the result of selections by the speaker/writer along at least four separate dimensions.

Root
At the heart of a Semitic verb is its root, most often consisting of three consonants. This determines the basic lexical meaning of the verb. For example, the Tigrinya root meaning 'break' consists of the three consonants {sbr}.
Derivational pattern
The root may be altered in one of several ways that modify the basic meaning of the verb. In Tigrinya there are five such possibilities (though not all are possible for each verb). For example, the verb can be made passive: the sense 'be broken' is derived from the root {sbr} 'break' with the addition of the PASSIVE morpheme, though the form's actual realization depends on choices on other dimensions.
Tense/Aspect/Mood
The root must be assigned a particular basic tense/aspect/mood (TAM). In Tigrinya there are four possibilities, conventionally referred to as perfect, imperfect, jussive/imperative, and gerundive. Once a lexical root, possibly altered through the addition of a derivational element, has been assigned a basic TAM, it becomes a pronounceable stem, though still not a complete word. For example, {sbr}+PASSIVE 'be broken' in the imperfect becomes sǝbbär 'is broken'.
Conjugation
Semitic verbs are conjugated; that is, they agree with the verb's subject in person, number, and gender. For example, if the subject of the imperfect of the passive of {sbr} is third person plural masculine ('they'), the form becomes the word ይስበሩ yǝsǝbbäru 'they are broken'.

In addition to these basic dimensions of variation characterizing all Tigrinya verbs, there are four additional possible modifications.

1. A direct object or prepositional object suffix (see #Personal pronouns) may be added to the verb. For example, the prepositional object -läy 'for me' could be suffixed to the word ይስበሩ yǝsǝbbäru 'they are broken' to give ይስበሩለይ yǝsǝbbäruläy 'they are broken for me'.
2. The verb may be negated. This requires a prefix and sometimes a suffix. For example, the word ይስበሩለይ yǝsǝbbäruläy 'they are broken for me' is negated by the prefixing of ay- and the suffixing of -n: ኣይስበሩለይን ayyǝsǝbbäruläyǝn 'they are not broken for me'.
3. One or more morphemes including the relativizing morpheme zǝ- and various prepositions and conjunctions may be prefixed to the verb. For example, with the relativizing prefix, the form ኣይስበሩለይን ayyǝsǝbbäruläyǝn 'they are not broken for me' becomes ዘይስበሩለይ zäyyǝsǝbbäruläy '(those) that are not broken for me'. (The negative suffix -n does not occur in subordinate clauses.)
4. The aspect of the verb may be modified through the addition of an auxiliary verb. Auxiliaries are usually treated as separate words in Tigrinya but in some cases are written as suffixes on the main verb. For example, with the auxiliary allo in its third person plural masculine form, the word ዘይስበሩለይ zäyyǝsǝbbäruläy '(those) that are not broken for me' takes on continuous aspect: ዘይስበሩለይ ዘለዉ zäyyǝsǝbbäruläy zälläwu '(those) which are not being broken for me'. (The relativizing prefix zǝ- must also appear on the auxiliary.)

== Prepositions ==
Tigrinya has both simple and compound prepositions. The main simple prepositions are the following.

ኣብ ab	'on, in, at'
ብ bǝ	'with' (instrument), 'by' (means, agent), 'in' (duration)
ን nǝ	'for (the benefit of), to the detriment of'
ል lə	‘for’ (Mekelle dialects)
ናይ nay	'of'
ምስ mǝs	'with' (accompaniment)
ካብ kab	'from'
ናብ nab	'to, toward'
ከም käm	'like, as'
ብዘይ bǝzäy	'without'
ምእንቲ mǝ’ǝnti, ስለ sǝlä	'for, because of, on the part of'
ድሕሪ dǝḥri	'after'
ቅድሚ qǝdmi	'before'
ክሳዕ kǝsa‘, ክሳብ kǝsab, ስጋዕ sǝga‘	'until'
ብዛዕባ bǝza‘ba	'about' (concerning)

With personal pronouns as objects, the pronouns take the form of possessive suffixes. In some cases, these are suffixed to a modified version of the preposition, and for the third person forms, there may be various possibilities: ንዕኡ nǝ‘ǝ’u ንእኡ nǝ’ǝ’u ንኡ nǝ’u 'for him'.

The compound prepositions consist of one of the simple prepositions, usually ኣብ ab, followed by a relational noun or a form related to a noun. Some compound prepositions alternate with simple prepositions consisting only of the second word: ድሕሪ dǝḥri ኣብ ድሕሪ ab dǝḥri 'after, behind', ቅድሚ qǝdmi ኣብ ቅድሚ ab qǝdmi 'before, in front of'. Other examples: ኣብ ውሽጢ ab wǝšt'i 'inside', ኣብ ጥቓ ab t'ǝx'a 'near', ኣብ ልዕሊ ab lǝ‘ǝli 'above, on', ኣብ ትሕቲ ab tǝḥti 'below', ኣብ ማእከል ab ma’käl 'in the middle of, among', ኣብ መንጎ ab mängo 'between'.

== Bibliography ==
- Amanuel Sahle (1998). Säwasǝw Tǝgrǝñña bǝsäffiw. Lawrenceville, NJ: Red Sea Press. ISBN 1-56902-096-5.
- Dan'el Täxlu Räda (1996, Eth. Cal.) Zäbänawi säwasəw kʷ'ankʷ'a Təgrəñña. Mäx'älä.
- Leslau, Wolf (1941) Documents tigrigna: grammaire et textes. Paris: Libraire C. Klincksieck.
- Mason, John (Ed.) (1996) Säwasǝw Tǝgrǝñña, Tigrinya grammar. Lawrenceville, NJ, USA: Red Sea Press. ISBN 0-932415-20-2 (ISBN 0-932415-21-0, paperback)
- Praetorius, F. (1871) Grammatik der Tigriñasprache in Abessinien. Halle. ISBN 3-487-05191-5 (1974 reprint)
- Tadross, Andrew & Abraham Teklu. (2015) The Essential Guide to Tigrinya: The Language of Eritrea and Tigray Ethiopia.
- Voigt, Rainer Maria (1977). Das tigrinische Verbalsystem. Berlin: Verlag von Dietrich Reimer.
