= Khmer grammar =

Grammar of the Khmer language

This article describes the grammar of the Khmer (Cambodian) language, focusing on the standard dialect.

== Word formation ==
Khmer is primarily an analytic language, with no inflection. There is some derivation by means of prefixes and infixes, but it is no longer always productive, as those elements are often crystallized in words inherited from Old Khmer. Even in Old Khmer, the same affix could have multiple functions (for example, it could serve as a nominalizer in one word and as a causativizer in another).

A common infix has the form [-ɑm(n)-] or [-ɑn-] (or with other vowels), inserted after an initial consonant, especially to convert adjectives or verbs into nouns.

Compounding is common; in a compound of two nouns, the head generally comes first, often the reverse of the English order: "duck egg" is ពងទា [pɔːŋ tiə], literally "egg-duck".

== Word order ==
Since Khmer is an analytic language, word order is relatively fixed, as changes in word order often affect meaning. Khmer is generally a subject–verb–object (SVO) language. Topicalization is common: the topic of the sentence is often placed at the start, with the rest of the sentence a comment on that topic.

Like in English, prepositions are used rather than postpositions (words meaning "in", "on", etc. precede the noun that they govern). The language is generally head-initial so modifiers come after the words modified (adjectives, possessives, demonstratives, relative clauses, etc. follow nouns; adverbs mostly follow verbs; and so on).

== Nouns ==
Khmer nouns have no grammatical gender or grammatical number inflections. There are no articles, but indefiniteness is often expressed by the word for "one" following the noun. Plurality can be marked by postnominal particles, numerals, or reduplication of a following adjective, which, although it is similar to intensification, is usually differentiated by context:

ឆ្កែ ធំ
cʰkae tʰom
dog large
large dog

ឆ្កែ ធំៗ
cʰkae {tʰom tʰom}
dog {large large}
large dogs or a very large dog

ឆ្កែ បី
cʰkae ɓəj
dog three
three dogs

ឆ្កែ ខ្លះ
cʰkae kʰlah
dog some
some dogs

Possessives are formed by placing the noun or pronoun representing the possessor after the main noun, often with the word របស់ [rəbɑh] between them. (The word របស់ is also a noun, meaning "thing".)

== Numbers and classifiers ==
In Khmer, a number that indicates quantity follows the noun.

សៀវភៅ បួន
{siəw pʰɨw} ɓuən
book four
four books

Exceptions include nouns indicating passage of time such as hours or days, units of measurement and currencies, all of which function as noun classifiers without the explicit mention of what is being classified. Reversal of the order can change the meaning:

បី ម៉ោង
ɓəj maoŋ
three hour
three hours

ម៉ោង បី
maoŋ ɓəj
hour three
three o'clock

Classifying particles for use with numerals and nouns exist but are optional, unlike Thai, except in introductory clauses. They are used for clarity or formality, and number precedes classifiers.

សត្វ ក្របី ពីរ
sat krɑbəj piː
animal buffalo two
two buffaloes

សត្វ ក្របី ពីរ ក្បាល
sat krɑbəj piː kbaːl
animal buffalo two {animal CL}
two (head of) buffaloes

The following example illustrates the superfluous mention of what is being classified:

បី រៀល
ɓəj riəl
three riel
three riels

លុយ បី រៀល
luj ɓəj riəl
money three riel
three riels of money or simply three riels

Counting in Khmer is based on a biquinary system (6 to 9 have the form "five one", "five two", etc.) However, the words for multiples of ten from 30 to 90 are not related to the basic Khmer numbers but are probably borrowed from Thai. The Khmer script has its own versions of the Arabic numerals.

The principal number words are listed in the following table, which gives Western and Khmer digits, Khmer spelling and IPA transcription:

0	០	សូន្យ	[soun]				
1	១	មួយ	[muəj]				
2	២	ពីរ	[piː]	20	២០	ម្ភៃ	[mphej]
3	៣	បី	[ɓəːj]	30	៣០	សាមសិប	[saːm səp]
4	៤	បួន	[ɓuən]	40	៤០	សែសិប	[sae səp]
5	៥	ប្រាំ	[pram]	50	៥០	ហាសិប	[haː səp]
6	៦	ប្រាំមួយ	[pram muəj]	60	៦០	ហុកសិប	[hok səp]
7	៧	ប្រាំពីរ	[pram piː], [pram pɨl]	70	៧០	ចិតសិប	[cət səp]
8	៨	ប្រាំបី	[pram ɓəːj]	80	៨០	ប៉ែតសិប	[paet səp]
9	៩	ប្រាំបួន	[pram ɓuən]	90	៩០	កៅសិប	[kaʋ səp]
10	១០	ដប់	[ɗɑp]	100	១០០	មួយរយ	[muəj rɔːj]

Intermediate numbers are formed by compounding the above elements. Powers of ten are denoted by រយ [rɔːj] (100), ពាន់ [pŏən] (1,000), ម៉ឺន [məɨn] (10,000), សែន [saen] (100,000), លាន [liən] (1,000,000) and កោដិ [kaot] (10,000,000). For more information, see Khmer numerals.

Ordinal numbers are formed by placing the particle ទី [tiː] before the corresponding cardinal number.

== Demonstratives ==
In Khmer, demonstratives follow the nouns that they modify. In standard literary Khmer, there are two degrees of distance, but there are other distinctions in colloquial language. Demonstratives can also function as articles only after introductory clauses.

Demonstrative	Alternative Forms	Meaning
នេះ (nih)	ហ្នឹង (nəŋ)	This
នោះ (nuh)	ហ្នុង (noŋ)	That

== Pronouns ==
The pronominal system is complex and is full of honorific variations. There is generally no single pronoun appropriate for all situations, with the choice of pronoun based on age, gender, and relationship. Nouns referring to a specific person, like brother or uncle, can be used as pronouns even when one directly addresses the person.

For some examples of typical pronoun forms, see Khmer language – Social registers. Below is a table of the most common kinship terms that are also used as personal pronouns.

Kinship term	Reciprocal	Translation	Non-kinship usage	Note
ឪពុក /ʔəw puk/	កូន /koːn/	father; child	none	formally refers to one's own father, other terms for "father/dad" include: /paː/, /ʔəw/, /bəi daː/, /puk/
ម្តាយ /mdaːj/	កូន /koːn/	mother; child		Many other terms are used commonly: /mae/, /maʔ/
បង /bɑːŋ/	ប្អូន, អូន /pʔoːn/, /ʔoːn/	older sibling	an older man or woman of the same generation; the man in a romantic relationship	ចែ /cae/ is a Chinese-derived term used to refer to a woman around the same age in Cambodia and is more often said among Chinese Cambodians and sometimes in urban settings
ប្អូន, អូន	បង	younger sibling	a younger person of the same generation; a child; the woman in a romantic relationship	Other colloquial terms are used to refer to younger generations using /ʔaː/ as a diminutive: /ʔaː nuh/, /miː nuh/, /niəŋ/
កូន /koːn/	ប៉ា, មែ /paː/, /mae/	biological child or grandchild	a young child; a person at least one generation younger	
ចៅ /caw/	តា, យាយ /taː/, /jiəj/	grandchild, cousin of junior generations	a young child; a person at least one generation younger	
តា /taː/	ចៅ or កូន /caw/ or /koːn/	grandfather	any man of grandparents' generation	other terms can be used depending on family structure and dialect
យាយ /jiəj/	ចៅ or កូន	grandmother	a middle-aged (married) woman	other terms may be used depending on family structure and dialect
មីង /miːŋ/	ក្មួយ /kmuəj/	a parent's younger sister/sister-in-law	any woman of parents' generation, but younger than parents, a young (usually unmarried) woman (formal)	អ៊ី /ʔiː/ is the equivalent Chinese term and, similar to /cae/, is sometimes used in urban areas and among Chinese Cambodians
ពូ /puː/	ក្មួយ /kmuəj/	a parent's younger brother/brother-in-law	any man of parents' generation, but younger than parents; also a man slightly older than the speaker (formal)	an equivalent, but more colloquial, term is /miə/
អ៊ុំ /ʔom/	ក្មួយ /kmuəj/	a parent's older sibling; his/her spouse	any person of parents' generation but older than parents	
អ្នក /nĕəʔ/	ប្អូន /pʔoːn/	"you" (when addressing an older brother- or sister-in-law)		third person equivalent is បងថ្លៃ /bɑːŋ tʰlai/

== Adjectives ==
Adjectives in Khmer follow the noun; doubling the adjective can indicate plurality or intensify the meaning (see Nouns above). Adjectives follow verbs when they function as adverbs. Adjectives are actually stative verbs and are used without a copula and can be negated, like other verbs.

Comparatives are expressed using the word ជាង /ciəŋ/: "A X /ciəŋ/ [B]" (A is more X [than B]). The most common way to express superlatives is with ជាងគេ /ciəŋ keː/: "A X /ciəŋ keː/" (A is X-est of all).

== Reduplication ==
In Khmer, nouns and adjectives can be reduplicated. Reduplication can occur as perfect reduplicates or by altering the rhyme of words. Khmer also uses compound reduplication in which two phonologically unrelated words with similar or identical meanings are compounded.

The Khmer script includes the symbol ៗ, which indicates that the preceding word or phrase is to be repeated.

== Verbs ==
As is typical of most East Asian languages, Khmer verbs do not inflect at all; tense and aspect can be expressed using particles (such as កំពុង [kəmpuŋ], placed before a verb to express continuous aspect) and adverbs (such as "yesterday", "earlier", "tomorrow"), or may be understood from context. Serial verb construction is quite common.

=== Questions ===
Yes–no questions can be formed by placing the particle ទេ /teː/ at the end of a sentence. This particle can also serve as an emphatic particle (it is also used in negative sentences, as shown below), and so intonation may be required to indicate that a question is being asked.

In wh-questions, the question word generally remains in its usual grammatical position in the sentence, rather than being brought to the start as in English (that is, wh-fronting does not normally take place).

=== Negation ===
Verbs can be negated in three primary fashions, all of which convey a slightly different connotation or formality. The most common method of negation is a discontinuous construction placing មិន "[mɨn]" (not, not to be) before the verb and ending the verb phrase with ទេ "[teː]", which, as a stand-alone word can be either "no" or a particle contradicting a previous statement. Colloquially, the final "ទេ" may be omitted.

ខ្ញុំ ជឿ
kʰɲom cɨə
I believe

ខ្ញុំ មិន ជឿ ទេ
kʰɲom mɨn cɨə teː
I don't believe

Another fairly common way of indicating negation uses អត់ (also spelled ⟨ឥត⟩) "[ɑt]" instead of មិន. "អត់", as an independent word, means "without" or "lacking" and expresses a similar connotation when used to negate a verb.

ខ្ញុំ អត់ ឃ្លាន ទេ
kʰɲom ɑt khliə̯n teː
"I am not hungry." (lit. "I (am) without hunger".)

A third method is basically identical to the first method except ពុំ "[pum]" is used instead of "[mɨn]". This is used only in literary or very formal contexts.
