= Inflected preposition =

Type of word in some languages

In linguistics, an inflected preposition is a type of word that occurs in some languages, that corresponds to the combination of a preposition and a personal pronoun. For instance, the Welsh word iddo (/ɪðɔ/) is an inflected form of the preposition i meaning "to/for him"; it would not be grammatically correct to say *i ef.

== Terminology and analysis ==
There are many different names for inflected prepositions, including conjugated preposition, pronominal preposition, prepositional pronoun, and suffixed pronoun. (But note that the term prepositional pronoun also has a different sense, for which see Prepositional pronoun.)

Historically, inflected prepositions can develop from the contraction of a preposition with a personal pronoun; however, they are commonly reanalysed as inflected words by native speakers and by traditional grammar.

Language change over time can obscure the similarity between the conjugated preposition and the preposition-pronoun combination. For example, in Scottish Gaelic "with" is le /lɛ/ and "him" is e /ɛ/, but "with him" is leis /leʃ/.

== Distribution ==
=== Insular Celtic ===
All Insular Celtic languages have inflected prepositions; these languages include Scottish Gaelic, Irish, Manx, Welsh, Cornish and Breton.

==== Scottish Gaelic ====
The following table shows the inflected forms of the preposition aig 'at'. These forms are a combination of preposition and pronoun, and are obligatory; that is, the separate preposition plus pronoun *aig mi 'at me' is ungrammatical. Also no separate pronoun may also be given after these combined forms. So *agam mi is ungrammatical.

		Singular	Plural
1st Person		agam	againn
2nd Person		agad	agaibh
3rd Person	Masculine	aige	aca
3rd Person	Feminine	aice	aca

==== Welsh ====
The following table shows the colloquial inflected forms of the preposition i 'to/for'. The optional pronouns that follow the inflected forms are given in parentheses.

		Singular	Plural
1st Person		imi, i mi, ifi, i fi	ini, i ni, inni
2nd Person		iti, i ti	ichi, i chi
3rd Person	Masculine	iddo (fe/fo)	iddyn (nhw)
3rd Person	Feminine	iddi (hi)	iddyn (nhw)

The sentence Mae hi wedi ei roi iddo fo 'she has given it to him' required the inflected form of i, *mae hi wedi ei roi i fo is not grammatically correct.

The following table gives the inflected colloquial forms of the preposition o 'of/from'. The optional pronouns that follow the inflected forms are given in parentheses.

		Singular	Plural
1st Person		ohonof (i), ohono (i)	ohonon (ni)
2nd Person		ohonot (ti)	ohonoch (chi)
3rd Person	Masculine	ohono (fe/fo)	ohonyn (nhw)
3rd Person	Feminine	ohoni (hi)	ohonyn (nhw)

=== Semitic ===
Inflected prepositions are found in many Semitic languages, including Hebrew, Arabic, Assyrian Neo-Aramaic and Amharic.

For example, the Arabic preposition على (/ʕalaː) 'on' inflects as علَيَّ (/ʕalajːa/) 'on me', علَيْكَ (/ʕalajka/) 'on you (M.SG)', علَيْهِ (/ʕalajhi/) 'on him', etc.

=== Iranic languages ===
Some Iranic languages, including Persian, have developed inflected prepositions. For example, Persian az u 'from him/her' becomes azaš; bā šomā 'with you PL' becomes bāhātun. These forms are non-obligatory and are used especially in the colloquial register, though some of them are also possible in the standard language. As the two examples show, they are not mere contractions but a system of inflectional endings attached to the preposition.

=== Other languages ===
Languages that do not have full paradigms of inflected prepositions may nonetheless allow contraction of prepositions and pronouns to a more limited extent.

In formal registers of Polish, a handful of common prepositions allow amalgamated forms with third-person pronouns: na niego 'on him/it' → nań. These contracted forms were often recommended to use in formal writing. However, they are rarely heard in daily speech.

In many Iberian Romance languages, such as Spanish and Portuguese, the preposition con or com 'with' has special forms incorporating certain pronouns (depending on the language). For example, in Spanish and Asturian conmigo means 'with me'. Historically, this developed from the Latin use of cum 'with' after a pronoun, as in mecum 'with me'.

=== Inflected postpositions ===
As languages can make use of postpositions rather than prepositions, so do some languages have inflected postpositions. Bororo, an indigenous language of Brazil, uses postpositions in all contexts: tori ji 'about the mountains'. When these modify a pronoun rather than a full noun, the phrase contracts into an inflected postposition (and therefore looks like a pronominal prefix, rather than a suffix as in the examples above: bagai 'for', i-wagai 'for me').

Athabaskan languages such as Dakelh also have inflected postpositions. For example, in the Stuart Lake dialect "for (the benefit of)" is ba, but "for me" is sba, not si ba, "for us" is neba, not wheni ba, "for you (one person)" is mba, not nyun ba, and "for them" is buba, not 'enne ba.

== See also ==
- Breton language: Grammar
- Arabic grammar
- Hebrew grammar
- Irish morphology
- Portuguese personal pronouns
- Scottish Gaelic grammar
- Hungarian noun phrases#Postpositions with personal suffixes
