= Adposition =

Class of words expressing spatiotemporal relations or semantic roles

In linguistics, adpositions are a class of words used to express spatial or temporal relations (in, under, towards, behind, ago, etc.) or mark various semantic roles (of, for). The most common adpositions are prepositions (which precede their complement) and postpositions (which follow their complement).

An adposition typically combines with a noun phrase, this being called its complement, or sometimes object. English generally has prepositions rather than postpositions – words such as in, under and of precede their objects, such as "in England", "under the table", "of Jane" – although there are a few exceptions including ago and notwithstanding, as in "three days ago" and "financial limitations notwithstanding". Some languages that use a different word order have postpositions instead (like Turkic languages) or have both types (like Finnish). The phrase formed by an adposition together with its complement is called an adpositional phrase (or prepositional phrase, postpositional phrase, etc.). Such a phrase can function as a grammatical modifier or complement in a wide range of types of phrases.

A less common type of adposition is the circumposition, which consists of two parts that appear on each side of the complement. Other terms sometimes used for particular types of adposition include ambiposition, inposition and interposition. Some linguists use the word preposition in place of adposition regardless of the applicable word order.

== Terminology ==
The word preposition comes from Latin: prae- prefix (pre- prefix) ("before") and Latin: ponere ("to put"). This refers to the situation in Latin and Greek (and in English), where such words are placed before their complement (except sometimes in Ancient Greek), and are hence "pre-positioned".

In some languages, including Sindhi, Punjabi, Saraiki, Hindustani (Hindi-Urdu), Odia, Turkish, Hungarian, Korean, and Japanese, the same kinds of words typically come after their complement. To indicate this, they are called postpositions (using the prefix post-, from Latin post meaning "behind, after"). There are also some cases where the function is performed by two parts coming before and after the complement; this is called a circumposition (from Latin circum- prefix "around").

In some languages, for example Finnish, some adpositions can be used as both prepositions and postpositions.

Prepositions, postpositions and circumpositions are collectively known as adpositions (using the Latin prefix ad-, meaning "to"). However, some linguists prefer to use the well-known and longer-established term preposition in place of adposition, irrespective of position relative to the complement.

== Grammatical properties ==
An adposition typically combines with exactly one complement, most often a noun phrase (or, in a different analysis, a determiner phrase). In English, this is generally a noun (or something functioning as a noun, e.g., a gerund), together with its specifier and modifiers such as articles, adjectives, etc. The complement is sometimes called the object of the adposition. The resulting phrase, formed by the adposition together with its complement, is called an adpositional phrase or prepositional phrase (PP) (or for specificity, a postpositional or circumpositional phrase).

An adposition establishes a grammatical relationship that links its complement to another word or phrase in the context. It also generally establishes a semantic relationship, which may be spatial (in, on, under, ...), temporal (after, during, ...), or of some other type (of, for, via, ...). The World Atlas of Language Structures treats a word as an adposition if it takes a noun phrase as a complement and indicates the grammatical or semantic relationship of that phrase to the verb in the containing clause.

Some examples of the use of English prepositions are given below. In each case, the prepositional phrase appears in italics, the preposition within it appears in bold, and the preposition's complement is underlined. As demonstrated in some of the examples, more than one prepositional phrase may act as an adjunct to the same word.

- As an adjunct to a noun:
  - the weather **in** March
  - cheese **from** France **with** live bacteria
- As a predicative expression (complement of a copula)
  - The key is **under** the stone.
- As an adjunct to a verb:
  - sleep **throughout** the winter
  - danced **atop** the tables **for** hours
  - dispense **with** the formalities (see Semantic functions, above)
- As an adjunct to an adjective:
  - happy **for** them
  - sick **until** recently

In the last of these examples the complement has the form of an adverb, which has been nominalised to serve as a noun phrase; see Different forms of complement, below. Prepositional phrases themselves are sometimes nominalized:

- **In** the cellar was chosen as the best place to store the wine.

An adposition may determine the grammatical case of its complement. In English, the complements of prepositions take the objective case where available (from him, not *from he). In Koine Greek, for example, certain prepositions always take their objects in a certain case (e.g., ἐν always takes its object in the dative), while other prepositions may take their object in one of two or more cases, depending on the meaning of the preposition (e.g., διά takes its object in the genitive or the accusative, depending on the meaning). Some languages have cases that are used exclusively after prepositions (prepositional case), or special forms of pronouns for use after prepositions (prepositional pronoun).

The functions of adpositions overlap with those of case markings (for example, the meaning of the English preposition of is expressed in many languages by a genitive case ending), but adpositions are classed as syntactic elements, while case markings are morphological.

Adpositions themselves are usually non-inflecting ("invariant"): they do not have paradigms of the form (such as tense, case, gender, etc.) the same way that verbs, adjectives, and nouns can. There are exceptions, though, such as prepositions that have fused with a pronominal object to form inflected prepositions.

The following properties are characteristic of most adpositional systems:

- Adpositions are among the most frequently occurring words in languages that have them. For example, one frequency ranking for English word forms begins as follows (prepositions in bold):

the, of, and, to, a, in, that, it, is, was, I, for, on, you, …

- The most common adpositions are single, monomorphemic words. According to the ranking cited above, for example, the most common English prepositions are on, in, to, by, for, with, at, of, from, as, all of which are single-syllable words and cannot be broken down into smaller units of meaning.
- Adpositions form a closed class of lexical items and cannot be productively derived from words of other categories.

== Classification of adpositions ==
As noted above, adpositions are referred to by various terms, depending on their position relative to the complement.

While the term preposition sometimes denotes any adposition, its stricter meaning refers only to one that precedes its complement. Examples of this, from English, have been given above; similar examples can be found in many European and other languages, for example:

- German: **mit** einer Frau ("**with** a woman")
- French: **sur** la table ("**on** the table")
- Welsh: **ar** y bwrdd ("**on** the table")
- Polish: **na** stole ("**on** the table")
- Russian: **у** меня ("**in the possession of** me" [I have])
- Khmer: **លើ**ក្តារខៀន [**ləː** kdaːkʰiən] ("**on** (the) blackboard")
- Tigrinya: **አብ ልዕሊ** ጣውላ [**abː** **lɨʕli** tʼawla] ("**at/on** **top** table"); **አብ ትሕቲ** ጣውላ [**abː** **tɨħti** tʼawla] ("**at/on** **under** table")

In certain grammatical constructions, the complement of a preposition may be absent or may be moved from its position directly following the preposition. This may be referred to as preposition stranding (see also below), as in "Whom did you go with?" and "There's only one thing worse than being talked about." There are also some (mainly colloquial) expressions in which a preposition's complement may be omitted, such as "I'm going to the park. Do you want to come with [me]?", and the French Il fait trop froid, je ne suis pas habillée pour ("It's too cold, I'm not dressed for [the situation].") The bolded words in these examples are generally still considered prepositions because when they form a phrase with a complement (in more ordinary constructions) they must appear first.

A postposition follows its complement to form a postpositional phrase. Examples include:

- Latin: me**cum** ("**with** me", literally "me **with**")
- Turkish: benim**le** or benim **ile** ("**with** me", literally "my **with**")
- Hungarian: fa **alatt** ("**under** the tree", literally "tree **under**")
- Chinese: 桌子**上** zhuōzi **shàng** (lit. "table **on**"); this is a nominal form, which usually requires an additional preposition to form an adverbial phrase (see Chinese locative phrases)
- English: ten kilometers **away**, ten months **ago** (both could be considered adverbs)

Some adpositions can appear either before or after their complement:

- English: the evidence **notwithstanding** OR **notwithstanding** the evidence
- German: meiner Meinung **nach** OR **nach** meiner Meinung ("**in** my opinion")
- German: die Straße **entlang** OR **entlang** der Straße ("**along** the road"; here a different case is used when entlang precedes the noun)
- Swedish: bröder **emellan** OR **emellan** bröder ("**between** brothers")

An adposition like the above, which can be either a preposition or a postposition, can be called an ambiposition. However, ambiposition may also be used to refer to a circumposition (see below), or to a word that appears to function as a preposition and postposition simultaneously, as in the Vedic Sanskrit construction (noun-1) ā (noun-2), meaning "from (noun-1) to (noun-2)".

Whether a language has primarily prepositions or postpositions is seen as an aspect of its typological classification, and tends to correlate with other properties related to head directionality. Since an adposition is regarded as the head of its phrase, prepositional phrases are head-initial (or right-branching), while postpositional phrases are head-final (or left-branching). There is a tendency for languages that feature postpositions also to have other head-final features, such as verbs that follow their objects; and for languages that feature prepositions to have other head-initial features, such as verbs that precede their objects. This is only a tendency, however; an example of a language that behaves differently is Latin, which employs mostly prepositions, even though it typically places verbs after their objects.

A circumposition consists of two or more parts, positioned on both sides of the complement. Circumpositions are very common in Pashto and Kurdish. The following are examples from Northern Kurdish (Kurmanji):

- bi ... re ("with")
- di ... de ("in", for things, not places)
- di ... re ("via, through")
- ji ... re ("for")
- ji ... ve ("since")

Various constructions in other languages might also be analyzed as circumpositional, for example:

- English: **from** now **on**
- Dutch: **naar** het einde **toe** ("towards the end", lit. "to the end to")
- Chinese: **从**冰箱**里** **cóng** bīngxiāng **lǐ** ("from the inside of the refrigerator", lit. "from refrigerator inside")
- French: **à** un détail **près** ("except for one detail", lit. "at one detail near")
- Swedish: **för** tre timmar **sedan** ("three hours ago", lit. "for three hours since")
- German: **aus** dem Zimmer **heraus** ("out from the room", lit. "from the room out")
- Tigrinya: **ካብ** ሕጂ '**ን**ደሓር ("from now on", lit. "from now to later")

Most such phrases, however, can be analyzed as having a different hierarchical structure (such as a prepositional phrase modifying a following adverb). The Chinese example could be analyzed as a prepositional phrase headed by cóng ("from"), taking the locative noun phrase bīngxīang lǐ ("refrigerator inside") as its complement.

An inposition is a rare type of adposition that appears between parts of a complex complement. For example, in the native Californian Timbisha language, the phrase "from a mean cold" can be translated using the word order "cold from mean"—the inposition follows the noun but precedes any following modifiers that form part of the same noun phrase. The Latin word cum is also commonly used as an inposition, as in the phrase summa cum laude, meaning "with highest praise", lit. "highest with praise".

The term interposition has been used for adpositions in structures such as word for word, French coup sur coup ("one after another, repeatedly"), and Russian друг с другом ("one with the other"). This is not a case of an adposition appearing inside its complement, as the two nouns do not form a single phrase (there is no phrase *word word, for example); such uses have more of a coordinating character.

== Stranding ==
Preposition stranding is a syntactic construct in which a preposition occurs somewhere other than immediately before its complement. For example, in the English sentence "What did you sit on?" the preposition on has what as its complement, but what is moved to the start of the sentence, because it is an interrogative word. This sentence is much more common and natural than the equivalent sentence without stranding: "On what did you sit?" Preposition stranding is commonly found in English, as well as North Germanic languages such as Swedish. Its existence in German is debated. Preposition stranding is also found in some Niger–Congo languages such as Vata and Gbadi, and in some North American varieties of French.

Some prescriptive English grammars teach that prepositions cannot end a sentence, although there is no rule prohibiting that use. Similar rules arose during the rise of classicism, when they were applied to English in imitation of classical languages such as Latin. Otto Jespersen, in his Essentials of English Grammar (first published 1933), commented on this definition-derived rule: "...nor need a preposition (Latin: praepositio) stand before the word it governs (go the fools among (Sh[akespeare]); What are you laughing at?). You might just as well believe that all blackguards are black or that turkeys come from Turkey; many names have either been chosen unfortunately at first or have changed their meanings in the course of time."

== Simple versus complex ==
Simple adpositions consist of a single word (on, in, for, towards, etc.). Complex adpositions consist of a group of words that act as one unit. Examples of complex prepositions in English include in spite of, with respect to, except for, by dint of, and next to.

The distinction between simple and complex adpositions is not clear-cut. Many complex adpositions are derived from simple forms (e.g., with + in → within, by + side → beside) through grammaticalisation. This change takes time, and during the transitional stages, the adposition acts in some ways like a single word, and in other ways like a multi-word unit. For example, current German orthographic conventions recognize the indeterminate status of certain prepositions, allowing two spellings: anstelle/an Stelle ("instead of"), aufgrund/auf Grund ("because of"), mithilfe/mit Hilfe ("by means of"), zugunsten/zu Gunsten ("in favor of"), zuungunsten/zu Ungunsten ("to the disadvantage of"), zulasten/zu Lasten ("at the expense of").

The distinction between complex adpositions and free combinations of words is not a black-and-white issue: complex adpositions (in English, "prepositional idioms") can be more fossilized or less fossilized. In English, this applies to a number of structures of the form "preposition + (article) + noun + preposition", such as in front of, for the sake of. The following characteristics are good indications that a given combination is "frozen" enough to be considered a complex preposition in English:

- It contains a word that cannot be used in any other context: by dint of, in lieu of.
- The first preposition cannot be replaced: with a view to but not *for/without a view to.
- It is impossible to insert an article, or to use a different article: on account of but not *on an/the account of; for the sake of but not *for a sake of.
- The range of possible adjectives is very limited: in great favor of, but not *in helpful favor of.
- The grammatical number of the noun cannot be changed: by virtue of but not *by virtues of.
- It is impossible to use a possessive determiner: in spite of him, not *in his spite.

== Marginal prepositions ==
Marginal prepositions are prepositions that have affinities with other word classes, most notably participles. Marginal prepositions behave like prepositions but derive from other parts of speech. Some marginal prepositions in English include barring, concerning, considering, excluding, failing, following, including, notwithstanding, regarding, and respecting.

== Proper versus improper ==
In descriptions of some languages, prepositions are divided into proper (or essential) and improper (or accidental). A preposition is called improper if it is some other part of speech being used in the same way as a preposition. Examples of simple and complex prepositions that have been so classified include prima di ("before") and davanti (a) ("in front of") in Italian, and ergo ("on account of") and causa ("for the sake of") in Latin. In reference to Ancient Greek, however, an improper preposition is one that cannot also serve as a prefix to a verb.

== Different forms of complement ==
As noted above, adpositions typically have noun phrases as complements. This can include nominal clauses and certain types of non-finite verb phrase:

- We can't agree on whether to have children or not (complement is a nominal clause)
- Let's think about solving this problem (complement is a gerund phrase)
- pour encourager les autres (French: "to encourage the others", complement is an infinitive phrase)

The word to when it precedes the infinitive in English is not a preposition, but rather is a grammatical particle outside of any main word class.

In other cases, the complement may have the form of an adjective or adjective phrase, or an adverbial. This may be regarded as a complement representing a different syntactic category, or simply as an atypical form of noun phrase (see nominalization).

- The scene went from blindingly bright to pitch black (complements are adjective phrases)
- I worked there until recently (complement is an adverb)
- Come out from under the bed (complement is an adverbial)

In the last example, the complement of the preposition from is in fact another prepositional phrase. The resulting sequence of two prepositions (from under) may be regarded as a complex preposition; in some languages, such a sequence may be represented by a single word, as Russian из-под iz-pod ("from under").

Some adpositions appear to combine with two complements:

- With Sammy president, we can all come out of hiding again.
- For Sammy to become president, they'd have to seriously modify the Constitution.

It is more commonly assumed, however, that Sammy and the following predicate forms a small clause, which then becomes the single complement of the preposition. (In the first example, a word such as as may be considered to have been elided, which, if present, would clarify the grammatical relationship.)

== Semantic functions ==
Adpositions can be used to express a wide range of semantic relations between their complement and the rest of the context. The relations expressed may be spatial (denoting location or direction), temporal (denoting position in time), or relations expressing comparison, content, agent, instrument, means, manner, cause, purpose, reference, etc.

Most common adpositions are highly polysemous (they have various different meanings). In many cases, a primary, spatial meaning becomes extended to non-spatial uses by metaphorical or other processes. Because of the variety of meanings, a single adposition often has many possible equivalents in another language, depending on the exact context. This can cause difficulties in foreign language learning. Usage can also vary between dialects of the same language (for example, American English has on the weekend, whereas British English uses at the weekend).

In some contexts (as in the case of some phrasal verbs) the choice of adposition may be determined by another element in the construction or be fixed by the construction as a whole. Here the adposition may have little independent semantic content of its own, and there may be no clear reason why the particular adposition is used rather than another. Examples of such expressions are:

- English: dispense with, listen to, insist on, proud of, good at
- Russian: otvechat' na vopros ("answer the question", literally "answer on the question"), obvinenie v obmane ("accusation of [literally: in] fraud")
- Spanish: soñar con ganar el título ("dream about [lit. with] winning the title"), consistir en dos grupos ("consist of [lit. in] two groups")

Prepositions sometimes mark roles that may be considered largely grammatical:

- possession (in a broad sense) – the pen of my aunt (sometimes marked by genitive or possessive forms)
- the agent in passive constructions – killed by a lone gunman
- the recipient of a transfer – give it to him (sometimes marked by a dative or an indirect object)

Spatial meanings of adpositions may be either directional or static. A directional meaning usually involves motion in a particular direction ("Kay went to the store"), the direction in which something leads or points ("A path into the woods"), or the extent of something ("The fog stretched from London to Paris"). A static meaning indicates only a location ("at the store", "behind the chair", "on the moon"). Some prepositions can have both uses: "he sat in the water" (static); "he jumped in the water" (probably directional). In some languages, the case of the complement varies depending on the meaning, as with several prepositions in German, such as in:

- in seinem Zimmer ("in his room", static meaning, takes the dative)
- in sein Zimmer ("into his room", directional meaning, takes the accusative)

In English and many other languages, prepositional phrases with static meaning are commonly used as predicative expressions after a copula ("Bob is at the store"); this may happen with some directional prepositions as well ("Bob is from Australia"), but this is less common. Directional prepositional phrases combine mostly with verbs that indicate movement ("Jay is going into her bedroom", but not *"Jay is lying down into her bedroom").

Directional meanings can be further divided into telic and atelic. Telic prepositional phrases imply movement all the way to the endpoint ("she ran to the fence"), while atelic ones do not ("she ran towards the fence").

Static meanings can be divided into projective and non-projective, where projective meanings are those whose understanding requires knowledge of the perspective or point of view. For example, the meaning of "behind the rock" is likely to depend on the position of the speaker (projective), whereas the meaning of "on the desk" is not (non-projective). Sometimes the interpretation is ambiguous, as in "behind the house," which may mean either at the natural back of the house or on the opposite side of the house from the speaker.

== Inflected adpositions ==
Some languages feature inflected adpositions—adpositions (usually prepositions) marked for grammatical person and/or grammatical number to give meanings such as "on me," "from you," etc. In the Indo-European languages this phenomenon is mostly confined to the Celtic languages like Welsh and Irish. Polish also allows some degree of combining prepositions with pronouns in the third person.

=== Celtic ===
The majority of Welsh prepositions can be inflected. This is achieved by having a preposition such as o ('of/from') + a linking element; in the case of o this is -hon- + the assimilated pronoun element, resulting in ohon- being the preposition's "stem" form. It is common in speech for the pronoun to be present after the preposition, but it can be omitted. Unless used with a pronoun the form is always o and not the "stem", e.g. dw i'n dod o Gymru – 'I come from Wales', gormod o gwrw – 'too much (of) beer'.

The following table gives the inflected forms of the preposition o ('of/from'). The optional pronouns that follow the inflected forms are given in parentheses.

		Singular	Plural
1st Person		ohonof (i), ohono (i) – 'of/from me'	ohonon (ni) – 'of/from us'
2nd Person		ohonot (ti) – 'of/from you'	ohonoch (chi) – 'of/from you'
3rd Person	Masculine	ohono (fe/fo) – 'of/from him/it'	ohonyn (nhw) – 'of/from them'
3rd Person	Feminine	ohoni (hi) – 'of/from her/it'	ohonyn (nhw) – 'of/from them'

Cymerodd ef hi ohonof – 'he took it from me'.

=== Semitic ===
Inflected prepositions are found in Semitic languages, including Hebrew, Arabic, Assyrian Neo-Aramaic and Amharic.

For example, the Arabic preposition على (/ʕalaː) 'on' inflects as علَيَّ (/ʕalajːa/) 'on me', علَيْكَ (/ʕalajka/) 'on you (M.SG)', علَيْهِ (/ʕalajhi/) 'on him', etc.

=== Other languages ===
Some Iranic languages, including Persian, have developed inflected prepositions. For example, Persian az u 'from him/her' becomes azaš; bā šomā 'with you PL' becomes bāhātun.

In Iberian Romance languages such as Spanish and Portuguese, the preposition con or com 'with' has special forms incorporating certain pronouns (depending on the language). For example, in Spanish and Asturian conmigo means 'with me'. Historically, this developed from the Latin use of cum 'with' after a pronoun, as in mecum 'with me'.

Bororo, an indigenous language of Brazil, uses postpositions in all contexts: tori ji 'about the mountains'. When these modify a pronoun rather than a full noun, the phrase contracts into an inflected postposition (and therefore looks like a pronominal prefix, rather than a suffix as in the examples above: bagai 'for', i-wagai 'for me').

== Overlaps with other categories ==
=== Adverbs and particles ===
There are often similarities in form between adpositions and adverbs. Some adverbs are derived from the fusion of a preposition and its complement (such as downstairs, from down (the) stairs, and underground, from under (the) ground). Some words can function both as adverbs and as prepositions, such as inside, aboard, underneath (for instance, one can say "go inside", with adverbial use, or "go inside the house", with prepositional use). Such cases are analogous to verbs that can be used either transitively or intransitively, and the adverbial forms might therefore be analyzed as "intransitive prepositions". This analysis could also be extended to other adverbs, such as here (this place), there (that place), afterward, etc., even though these never take complements.

Many English phrasal verbs contain particles that are used adverbially, even though they mostly have the form of a preposition (such words may be called prepositional adverbs). Examples are on in carry on, get on, etc., and over in take over, fall over, and so on. The equivalents in Dutch and German are separable prefixes, which also often have the same form as prepositions: for example, Dutch aanbieden and German anbieten (both meaning "to offer") contain the separable prefix aan/an, which is also a preposition meaning "on" or "to".

=== Conjunctions ===
Some words can be used both as adpositions and as subordinating conjunctions:

- (preposition) before/after/since the end of the summer
- (conjunction) before/after/since the summer ended
- (preposition) It looks like another rainy day
- (conjunction) It looks like it's going to rain again today

It would be possible to analyze such conjunctions (or even other subordinating conjunctions) as prepositions that take an entire clause as a complement.

=== Verbs ===
In some languages, including a number of Chinese varieties, many of the words that serve as prepositions can also be used as verbs. For instance, in Standard Chinese, 到 dào can be used in either a prepositional or a verbal sense:

- 我到北京去 wǒ dào Běijīng qù ("I go to Beijing"; qù, meaning "to go", is the main verb, dào is prepositional meaning "to")
- 我到了 wǒ dào le ("I have arrived"; dào is the main verb, meaning "to arrive")

Because of this overlap, and the fact that a sequence of prepositional phrases and verb phrases often resembles a serial verb construction, Chinese prepositions (and those of other languages with similar grammatical structures) are often referred to as coverbs.

As noted in previous sections, Chinese can also be said to have postpositions, although these can be analyzed as nominal (noun) elements. For more information, see the article on Chinese grammar, particularly the sections on coverbs and locative phrases.

=== Case affixes ===
Some grammatical case markings have a similar function to adpositions; a case affix in one language may be equivalent in meaning to a preposition or postposition in another. For example, in English, the agent of a passive construction is marked by the preposition by, while in Russian it is marked by the use of the instrumental case. Sometimes such equivalences exist within a single language; for example, the genitive case in German is often interchangeable with a phrase using the preposition von (just as in English, the preposition of is often interchangeable with the possessive suffix 's).

Adpositions combine syntactically with their complement, whereas case markings combine with a noun morphologically. In some instances it may not be clear which applies; the following are some possible means of making such a distinction:

- Two adpositions can usually be joined with a coordinating conjunction and share a single complement (of and for the people), whereas this is generally not possible with case affixes;
- One adposition can usually combine with two coordinated complements (of the city and the world), whereas a case affix would need to be repeated with each noun (Latin urbis et orbis, not *urb- et orbis);
- Case markings combine primarily with nouns, whereas adpositions can combine with (nominalized) phrases of different categories;
- A case marking usually appears directly on the noun, but an adposition can be separated from the noun by other words;
- Within the noun phrase, determiners and adjectives may agree with the noun in case (case spreading), but an adposition only appears once;
- A language can have hundreds of adpositions (including complex adpositions), but no language has that many distinct morphological cases.

Even so, a clear distinction cannot always be made. For example, the post-nominal elements in Japanese and Korean are sometimes called case particles and sometimes postpositions. Sometimes they are analyzed as two different groups because they have different characteristics (e.g., the ability to combine with focus particles), but in such analysis, it is unclear which words should fall into which group.

Turkish, Finnish and Hungarian have both extensive case-marking and postpositions, but there is evidence to help distinguish the two:

- Turkish: (case) sinemaya (cinema-dative, "to the cinema") vs. (postposition) sinema için ("for the cinema")
- Finnish: (case) talossa (house-inessive, "in the house") vs. (postposition) talon edessä (house-genitive in front, "in front of the house")
- Hungarian: (case) tetőn (roof-superessive, "on the roof") vs. (postposition) tető alatt ("under the roof")

In these examples, the case markings form a word with their hosts (as shown by vowel harmony, other word-internal effects and agreement of adjectives in Finnish), while the postpositions are independent words. As is seen in the last example, adpositions are often used in conjunction with case affixes – in languages that have a case, a given adposition usually takes a complement in a particular case, and sometimes (as has been seen above) the choice of the case helps specify the meaning of the adposition.

== See also ==
- English prepositions
- List of English prepositions
- Old English prepositions
- Spanish prepositions
- Japanese particles
- Relational noun

== Bibliography ==
- Haspelmath, Martin. (2003) "Adpositions". International Encyclopedia of Linguistics. 2nd ed. New York: Oxford University Press. ISBN 0-19-513977-1.
- Huddleston, Rodney, and Geoffrey K. Pullum. (2002) The Cambridge Grammar of the English Language. Cambridge: Cambridge University Press. ISBN 0-521-43146-8.
- Huddleston, Rodney; Pullum, Geoffrey K.; Reynolds, Brett (2022). A Student's Introduction to English Grammar (2nd ed.). Cambridge: Cambridge University Press. ISBN 978-1-009-08574-8.
- Koopman, Hilda. (2000) "Prepositions, postpositions, circumpositions, and particles". In The Syntax of Specifiers and Heads, pp. 204–260. London: Routledge.
- Libert, Alan R. (2006) Ambipositions. LINCOM studies in language typology (No. 13). LINCOM. ISBN 3-89586-747-0.
- Maling, Joan. (1983) "Transitive adjectives: A case of categorial reanalysis". In F. Heny and B. Richards (eds), Linguistic Categories: Auxiliaries and Related Puzzles, Vol. 1, pp. 253–289. Dordrecht: Reidel.
- Melis, Ludo. (2003) La préposition en français. Gap: Ophrys.
- Pullum, Geoffrey K. (2005). "Phrasal Prepositions in a Civil Tone". Language Log.
- Quirk, Randolph, and Joan Mulholland. (1964) "Complex Prepositions and Related Sequences". English Studies, suppl. to vol. 45, pp. 64–73.
- Rauh, Gisa. (1991) Approaches to Prepositions. Tübingen: Gunter Narr.
- Reindl, Donald F. (2001) "Areal Effects on the Preservation and Genesis of Slavic Postpositions". In Lj. Šarić and D. F. Reindl On Prepositions (= Studia Slavica Oldenburgensia 8), pp. 85–100. Oldenburg: Carl-von-Ossietzky-Universitat Oldenburg.
