= D with stroke (disambiguation) =

A letter D with stroke (Đ, đ) is the letter formed from the base character D/d overlaid with a crossbar, used in Serbo-Croatian, Vietnamese, Moro, the Sámi languages and the Kven language.

D with stroke may also refer to:

- Eth (Ð, ð), used in Icelandic, Faroese, and Old English
- African D (Ɖ, ɖ), representing a voiced retroflex plosive sound
- Tau gallicum (Ꟈ, ꟈ), used in Gaulish

Other uses:

- Dogecoin, which uses capital eth (Ð) as its currency symbol
- In chemistry, dispersity is represented by the symbol Ð
- In mathematics and quantum physics, the Dirac operator is sometimes represented by a D with a slash through it
