= Cornish grammar =

Grammar of the Cornish language

Cornish grammar is the grammar of the Cornish language (Kernewek or Kernowek), an insular Celtic language closely related to Breton and Welsh and, to a lesser extent, to Irish, Manx and Scottish Gaelic. It was the main medium of communication of the Cornish people for much of their history until the 17th century, when a language shift occurred in favour of English. A revival, however, started in 1904, with the publication of A Handbook of the Cornish Language, by Henry Jenner, and since then there has been a growing interest in the language.

== Initial consonant mutation ==
Initial mutation is a feature shared by all the modern Celtic languages, in which the initial consonant of a word may change under some circumstances. In Cornish these changes take place when a word starts with one of the consonants shown in the table below; other initial consonants remain unchanged. The most common mutation occurs after the definite article an, when followed by a feminine singular noun or masculine plural person noun.

Consonant Mutation in Cornish
Unmutated consonant	Soft mutation	Aspirate mutation	Hard mutation	Mixed mutation
p /p/	b /b/	f /f/	—N/a	—N/a
t /t/	d /d/	th /θ/	—N/a	—N/a
k /k/	g /ɡ/	h /h/	—N/a	—N/a
b /b/	v /v/	—N/a	p /p/	f /f/
d /d/	dh /ð/	—N/a	t /t/	t /t/
g (Note: Before unrounded vowels (i, y, e, a), l, and r + unrounded vowel.) /ɡ/	disappears	—N/a	k /k/	h /h/
g (Note: Before rounded vowels (o, u), and r + rounded vowel.) /ɡ/	w /w/	—N/a	k /k/	hw /ʍ/
gw /ɡw/	w /w/	—N/a	kw /kw/	hw /ʍ/
m /m/	v /v/	—N/a	—N/a	f /f/
ch /tʃ/	j /dʒ/	—N/a	—N/a	—N/a

=== Environments of mutation ===
==== Soft mutation ====
- After a soft mutation trigger such as a 'of', dhe 'to', war 'on', dha 'your', etc:
  - Kernewek 'Cornish language' → an myns a Gernewek 'the amount of the Cornish language'
  - Pennsans 'Penzance' → ni eth dhe Bennsans 'we went to Penzance'
- Feminine singular nouns after the definite article 'an':
  - palores 'chough' → an balores 'the chough'
  - kath 'cat' → an gath 'the cat'
- Feminine nouns after the numeral unn 'one':
  - kath 'cat' → unn gath 'one cat'
  - melin 'mill' → unn velin 'one mill'
- All nouns after the numeral dew/diw 'two':
  - chi 'house' → dew ji 'two houses'
  - benyn 'woman' → diw venyn 'two women'
- Masculine plural person nouns after the definite article 'an':
  - an devnydhyer 'the user' → an dhevnydhyoryon 'the users'
  - an Kernow 'the Cornishman' → an Gernowyon 'the Cornishmen'
- Adjectives and adjectival nouns/verbs after feminine singular nouns and masculine plural person nouns:
  - bras 'large' → fenten vras 'a large well'
  - kuv 'kind' → Kembryon guv 'kind Welshmen'
  - difudhi 'to extinguish' → tus-dhifudhi 'firefighters'
  - kemeneth 'community' → kresen gemeneth 'community centre'

==== Aspirate mutation ====
- After an aspirate mutation trigger such as ow 'my', hy 'her', or aga 'their':
  - penn-bloodh 'birthday' → hy fenn-bloodh 'her birthday'
  - tas 'father' → ow thas 'my father'
  - koos 'forest' → aga hoos 'their forest'
- All nouns after the numeral tri/teyr 'three':
  - tarow 'bull' → tri tharow 'three bulls'
  - kath 'cat → teyr hath 'three cats'

==== Hard mutation ====
- After a hard mutation trigger such as mar 'if/whether', ow '-ing':
  - gallav 'I can' → mar kallav 'if I can'
  - dyski 'to learn' → yth esov ow tyski 'I am learning'

==== Mixed mutation ====
- After a mixed mutation trigger such as y 'pre-verbal particle' p'eur 'when', may 'which', 'th 'you (infixed pronoun)':
  - bydh (third-person singular future indicative of bos 'to be') → y fydh moy 'there will be more'
  - gwruss' ta 'did you' → p'eur hwruss' ta hy helli? 'When did you lose her?'
  - gyllir (impersonal present/future indicative of gallos 'to be able to') → leow salow may hyllir triga hag oberi 'safe places where one can live and work'
  - baya 'to kiss' → my a'th faya 'I kiss you'

== Nouns ==
=== Gender ===
Cornish nouns, like those of other Celtic languages, possess two grammatical genders, meaning that they belong to one of two groups: masculine or feminine. Sometimes the gender of a noun can be inferred from the class of words it belongs to, for example, nouns referring to males, such as gour “man, husband” or tarow “bull”, or verbal nouns, such as kerdhes “walking” and bos “being”, are masculine whereas nouns referring to females, such as hwor “sister” and yar “hen”, are feminine. Nevertheless, it is often impossible to determine the gender of a noun from its form, although certain nominal suffixes have gender:

- Masculine suffixes: -adow, -der/-ter, -di/-ji/-ti, -ik, -la, -(n)eth (mostly), -our, -(y)ans, -yas, -ydh, -(y)er, -yn, -(y)or
- Feminine suffixes: -a, -ek, -el, -en, -es, -(on)ieth

There is a very small number of nouns which may be either gender, such as nev “heaven” and tonn “grassland”, and is similar to its sister language Breton in that the noun tra “thing” takes masculine numerals above one and masculine referring pronouns but has the mutations of a feminine noun after an “the”, unn “one” and on accompanying adjectives.

=== Number ===
==== Singular and plural ====
Most nouns have a singular and plural form, the latter deriving from the former in a number of ways. Plural forms may add an ending to a singular, such as treth “beach” to trethow, pompyon “pumpkin” to pompyons and lader “thief” to ladron. Adding an ending may be accompanied by a vowel change, as in the case of gwreg “wife” to gwragedh and hwor “sister” to hwerydh, or may involve a vowel change alone, for example korn “horn” to kern and men “stone” to meyn.

==== Dual ====
A small number of nouns display relics of a dual system. These are formed by prefixing masculine dew or feminine diw, both “two”, to the respective noun. Dual nouns are often parts of the body and indicate the pair of them taken together, for instance, lagas “eye” to dewlagas “(pair of) eyes” and bregh “arm” to diwvregh “(pair of) arm”. These carry a different meaning to the regular plural forms, such as lagasow or lagajow “eyes” and breghow “arms”, which do not indicate a matching pair.

==== Collective and singulative ====
A distinctive and unusual feature of Brythonic languages is that of collective and singulative number. The base form of some Cornish nouns denotes a class or group, often natural objects, such as sab “pine trees”, kelyon “flies” and niwl “fog”. A singulative is formed by adding the feminine ending -en to denote a single individual of the group, hence saben “a pine tree”, kelyonen “a fly” and niwlen “a patch of fog”. Singulatives can themselves have plural forms in -ow, denoting a number of individuals of the group, so for instance, kelyonen gives kelyonennow “(a number of) flies (individually)”.

== Determiners ==
=== Articles ===
Cornish lacks an indefinite article (although unn “one” is sometimes used to mean ”a certain...” e.g. unn ki “a certain dog”), but has a definite article, an, which precedes the noun, for example an Kernow “the Cornishman” and an Kernowesow “the Cornishwomen”. The article causes a soft mutation on feminine singular nouns, such as Kernowes “Cornishwoman” to an Gernowes “the Cornishwoman”, and on masculine plural nouns denoting persons, as Kernowyon “Cornishmen” to an Gernowyon “the Cornishmen”, although exceptions to the latter include an tasow “the fathers” and clear English borrowings such as an doktours “the doctors”. Also the masculine plural nouns meyn ”stones” and mergh ”horses” are exceptions, which are lenited to an veyn ”the stones” and an vergh ”the horses”, respectively. An is shortened to 'n after certain function words that end in a vowel, meaning a “of”, dhe “to” and ha “and” become a'n “of the”, dhe'n “to the” and ha'n “and the”, and in addition, yn “in” becomes identically pronounced y'n “in the”.

=== Demonstrative determiners ===
The definite article and a noun followed by the clitics ma and na to produce the demonstratives “this/these” and “that/those” respectively, for example an lyver ma “this book” and an lyvrow na “those books”.

=== Possessive determiners ===
The possessive determiners are as follows. Notice their similarity to the more reduced forms of the personal pronouns.

		singular	plural
1st person		ow	agan
2nd person		dha	agas
3rd person	masculine	y	aga
3rd person	feminine	hy	aga
3rd person	non-binary (proposed)	agans	aga

== Pronouns ==
=== Personal pronouns ===
Personal pronouns in Cornish can be arranged as follows.

			Independent	Reduced	Suffixed		
			Independent	Reduced	Single	Double	Reduced
singular	1st person		my	’m	-vy	-evy	-(m)a
singular	2nd person		ty	’th	-jy	-tejy	-(t)a
singular	3rd person	masculine	ev	’n	-e(v)	-eev	-(v)a
singular	3rd person	feminine	hi	’s	-hi	-hyhi	—N/a
singular	3rd person	non-binary (proposed)	ins	'ns	?	?	?
plural	1st person		ni	’gan, ’n	-ni	-nyni	—N/a
plural	2nd person		hwi	’gas, ’s	-hwi	-hwyhwi	—N/a
plural	3rd person		i	’s	-i	-ynsi	—N/a

Independent personal pronouns are used as the subject of a nominal sentence, for example My a grys “I believe”, or can stand before the verb in a verbal sentence to draw attention to the subject implied by the verb, for example Ni ny yllyn mos “We cannot go”. Certain other constructions employ independent pronouns, such as those based on verbal nouns, like ev dhe dhos omma “(that) he came here”, and those that follow conjunctions, such as hag i ow kortos “as they are/were waiting”.

Suffixed pronouns are attached to nouns in possessive constructions, to inflected verbs and to pronouns and are used to reinforce a pronoun previously expressed by a verbal or personal ending, for example Ple eth hi? “Where did she go?”.

Reduced pronouns are used between a verbal particle and a verb, such as in mar ny’th welav “if I don't see you”.

=== Demonstrative pronouns ===
Demonstrative pronouns display two degrees of proximity as well as gender and number.

	Singular			Plural
	masculine	feminine	non-binary (proposed)	common
Near the speaker	hemma	homma	hemmans	an re ma
Near the listener	henna	honna	hennans	an re na

These pronouns lose their final a before yw “is” and o “was”, for example Homm yw ow keniterow “This is my (female) cousin”.

== Adjectives ==
Cornish adjectives usually come after the noun they modify although a few may come before or after, such as drog “bad” and leun “full”, and a small number always precede the noun, such as lies “many” and hen “old, long-standing”. There are simple and derived adjectives. The former comprise adjectives that are not derived of any other word, whereas the latter are formed by adding suffixes such as -ek to the end of a noun (including verbal nouns). Adjectives are lenited when they are preceded by a feminine singular noun, or a masculine plural noun referring to persons, e.g. benen goth 'an old woman', mebyon vyghan 'small sons'.

=== Comparison ===
Adjectives are inflected with -a to give a comparative/superlative form. This suffix causes provection of the adjective stem, for example glyb “wet” to glyppa and krev “stong” to kreffa. A number of adjectives are irregular and have separate comparative and superlative forms.

positive	comparative	superlative
byghan, “small” nebes “little” (quantity)	le “smaller, fewer, less”	lyha “smallest, fewest, least”
da, mas “good”	gwell “better”	gwella “best”
drog “bad”	gweth, lakka “worse”	gwettha “worst”
isel “low”	isella, is (Note: Used in place names.) “lower”	isella, isa “lowest”
meur “much, great”	moy “more, greater”	moyha “most, greatest”
ogas “near”	nes “nearer”	nessa “nearest”

== Adverbs ==
Adverbials in Cornish may be a single word or a more complex phrases, for example ena “then” and y’n eur ma “now”, literally “in this hour”. Many are formed from the combination of a preposition and a noun or pronoun, such as war-woles “downwards” from war “on” and goles “bottom” and a-ji (or a-jei) “within” from a “from, at” and chi (or chei) “house”. Adverbs can be formed from adjectives by means of the particle yn, such as in the case of krev “strong” to yn krev “strongly” and da “good” to yn ta “well”.

== Verbs ==
=== Regular conjugation ===
Cornish verbs are highly regular and are conjugated to show distinctions of person, number, mood, tense and aspect in various combinations.

example conjugation of prena "buy"
		1st person		2nd person		3rd person		Impersonal (Note: The impersonal form is equivalent to the use of the English pronoun one and can be used in a similar way to the English passive, for example, Prenas an boos “One bought the food; The food was bought”.)
		singular	plural	singular	plural	singular	plural	Impersonal
Indicative	Present / Future	prenav	prenyn	prenydh	prenowgh	pren (Note: The third person singular indicative present/future and the second person imperative utilise the verbal stem with no ending.)	prenons	prenir
Indicative	Preterite	prenis	prensyn	prensys	prensowgh	prenas (Note: In the third person singular and impersonal preterite, some verbs take the alternative ending -is, for example tevi “grow” to tevis and gelwel “call” to gelwis.)	prensons	prenas
Indicative	Imperfect (Note: Certain verbs take slightly different endings in the indicative imperfect. Instead of -en, -es and -a, they take -yn, -ys and -i respectively, for example, hwerthin “laugh” to hwerthyn “I/we were laughing”, hwerthys “you [singular] were laughing”, hwerthi “he/she/it was laughing”.)	prenen	prenen	prenes	prenewgh	prena	prenens	prenys
Indicative	Pluperfect	prensen	prensen	prenses	prensewgh	prensa	prensens	prensys
Subjunctive (Note: The final consonant of a verb stem is modified before subjunctive endings. Consonants are usually lengthened, shortening the previous vowel, and voiced stops and fricatives are devoiced and lengthened, for example, igeri “open” to igerriv, kregi “hang” to krekkiv and hwedhla “tell tales” to hwetthliv.)	Present / Future	prenniv	prennyn	prenni	prennowgh	prenno	prennons	prenner
Subjunctive	Imperfect	prennen	prennen	prennes	prennewgh	prenna	prennens	prennys
Imperative		—N/a	prenyn	pren	prenewgh	prenes	prenens	—N/a

Verbal noun	Present participle	Past participle
prena (Note: The infinitive form is considered to be a verbal noun in Cornish grammars, meaning an example like prena can function as both verbal “to buy” and nominal “(the act of) buying”. A number of different verbal noun endings exist.)	ow prena	prenys

Certain points should be observed about the above:

It should also be noted that vowel affection occurs in the stem of some verbs before certain endings, especially those with close front vowels, though not exclusively.

affection with tava "touch"
		1st person		2nd person		3rd person		Impersonal^{5}
		singular	plural	singular	plural	singular	plural	Impersonal^{5}
Indicative	Present / Future	tavav	tevyn	tevydh	tevowgh	tav^{2}	tavons^{4}	tevir
Indicative	Preterite	tevis	tevsyn	tevsys	tevsowgh	tavas^{3}	tavsons	tavas^{3}
Indicative	Imperfect	taven^{1}	taven^{1}	taves^{1}	tavewgh^{4}	tava^{1}	tavens^{4}	tevys
Indicative	Pluperfect	tavsen	tavsen	tavses	tavsewgh	tavsa	tavsens	tevsys
Subjunctive	Present / Future	tyffiv	tyffyn	tyffi	tyffowgh	taffo	taffons	taffer^{4}
Subjunctive	Imperfect	taffen	taffen	taffes	taffewgh	taffa	taffens	tyffys
Imperative		—N/a	tevyn	tav^{2}	tevyn	taves^{4}	tavens^{4}	—N/a

Verbal noun	Present participle	Past participle
tava^{5}	ow tava	tevys

Note:

^1The alternative indicative imperfect endings -yn, -ys and -i cause vowel affection.
^2Amongst the endingless forms, the present/future third person singular and the second person singular imperative, the former may include vowel affection while the latter does not, for example, seni “sound” to sen “he/she/it sounds” and son “sound!” and gelwel “call” to gelow “he/she/it calls” and galw “call!”.
^3The alternative third person singular and impersonal preterite ending -is causes vowel affection.
^4These endings also cause affection with some verbs.
^5Certain verbal noun endings cause vowel affection, again especially those with close front vowels.

=== Irregular conjugation ===
A handful of irregular verbs exist, alongside their English equivalents when translated; the most common of which are detailed here.

The most irregular verb of all is bos “be”, which is often used as an auxiliary and can be conjugated to show a number of additional distinctions not present in other verbs.

bos "be"
			1st person		2nd person		3rd person		Impersonal
			singular	plural	singular	plural	singular	plural	Impersonal
Indicative	Present^{1}	short form	ov	on	os	owgh	yw	yns	or
Indicative	Present^{1}	long form	esov	eson	esos	esowgh	yma, usi, eus^{2}	ymons, esons^{2}	eder
Indicative	Future		bydhav	bydhons	bydhydh	bydhowgh	bydh	bydhons	bydher
Indicative	Preterite		beuv	beun	beus	bewgh	beu	bons	beus
Indicative	Imperfect^{1}	short form	en	en	es	ewgh	o	ens	os
Indicative	Imperfect^{1}	long form	esen	esen	eses	esewgh	esa	esens	eses
Indicative	Imperfect^{1}	habitual	bedhen	bedhen	bedhes	bedhewgh	bedha	bedhens	bedhes
Indicative	Pluperfect		bien	bien	bies	biewgh	bia	biens	bies
Subjunctive	Present / Future		biv	byn	bi	bowgh	bo	bons	ber
Subjunctive	Imperfect		ben	ben	bes	bewgh	be	bens	bes
Imperative			—N/a	bedhen	bydh	bedhewgh	bedhes	bedhens	—N/a

Verbal noun	Present participle	Past participle
bos, bones	ow pos, ow pones	*bedhys^{3}

Some peculiarities of bos to be noted as follows:

^1The present tense has separate short and long forms. The short forms are used when a subject complement is a noun or adjective whereas the long forms are used with adverbial and participle complements. In addition, the imperfect has a habitual form.
^2Yma and ymons are used in affirmitive declarative independent clauses whereas usi, eus and esons are used elsewhere, such as negative, interrogative and dependent clauses. Usi is used with definite subjects whereas eus is used with indefinite subjects.
^3The form *bedhys is not found independently but rather in its mutated form vedhys as part of compound words, such as godhvedhys “known” and piwvedhys “owned”.

Y'm beus is a combination of a reduced pronoun with dative meaning and the third person singular forms of bos, meaning literally “there is to [me]”, or more idiomatically “[I] have”. A similar construction is present in Breton. The presence of the pronoun means there are separate masculine and feminine third person singular forms but no impersonal forms, verbal noun or participles.

			1st person		2nd person		3rd person		
			singular	plural	singular	plural	singular		plural
			singular	plural	singular	plural	masculine	feminine	plural
Indicative	Present		y'm beus	y'gan beus	y'th eus	y'gas beus	y'n jeves	y’s teves	y’s teves
Indicative	Future		y'm byth	y'gan byth	y'fydh	y'gas byth	y'n jevydh	y’s tevydh	y’s tevydh
Indicative	Preterite		y'm beu	y'gan beu	y'th o	y'gas beu	y'n jevo	y’s tevo	y’s tevo
Indicative	Imperfect	simple	y'm bo	y'gan bo	y'fedha	y'gas bo	y'n jevedha	y’s tevedha	y’s tevedha
Indicative	Imperfect	habitual	y'm bedha	y'gan bedha	y'feu	y'gas bedha	y'n jeva	y’s teva	y’s teva
Indicative	Pluperfect		y'm beu	y'gan beu	y'fia	y'gas beu	y'n jevia	y’s tevia	y’s tevia
Subjunctive	Present / Future		y'm bo	y'gan bo	y'fo	y'gas bo	y'n jeffo	y’s teffo	y’s teffo
Subjunctive	Imperfect		y'm be	y'gan be	y'fe	y'gas be	y'n jeffa	y’s teffa	y’s teffa

Verbal noun	Present participle	Past participle
bos, bones	ow pos, ow pones	*bedhys

The irregular verb godhvos (or goffos) “know, can (know how to)” is based upon bos although does not utilise a habitual imperfect.

godhvos (or goffos) "know, can (know how to)"
		1st person		2nd person		3rd person		Impersonal
		singular	plural	singular	plural	singular	plural	Impersonal
Indicative	Present	gonn	godhon	godhes	godhowgh	gor	godhons	deer
Indicative	Future	godhvydhav	godhvydhyn	godhvydhydh	godhvydhowgh	godhvydh	godhvydhons	godhvydher
Indicative	Preterite	godhvev	godhven	godhves	godhvewgh	godhva	godhvons	godhves
Indicative	Imperfect	godhyen	godhyen	godhyes	godhyewgh	godhya	godhyens	godhves
Indicative	Pluperfect	godhvien	godhvien	godhvies	godhviewgh	godhvia	godhviens	godhvies
Subjunctive	Present / Future	godhviv	godhvyn	godhvi	godhvyn	godhvo	godhvons	godher
Subjunctive	Imperfect	godhven	godhven	godhves	godhvewgh	godhve	godhvens	godhves
Imperative		—N/a	godhvydhyn	godhvydh	godhvydhewgh	godhvydhes	godhvydhens	—N/a

Verbal noun	Present participle	Past participle
godhvos	ow kodhvos	godhvedhys

Another extremely common irregular verb also used as an auxiliary is gul “do, make”.

gul "do, make"
		1st person		2nd person		3rd person		Impersonal
		singular	plural	singular	plural	singular	plural	Impersonal
Indicative	Present / Future	gwrav	gwren	gwredh	gwrewgh	gwra	gwrons	gwrer
Indicative	Preterite	gwrug	gwrussyn	gwrussys	gwrussowgh	gwrug	gwrussons	gwrug
Indicative	Imperfect	gwren	gwren	gwres	gwrewgh	gwre	gwrens	gwres
Indicative	Pluperfect	gwrussen	gwrussen	gwrusses	gwrussewgh	gwrussa	gwrussens	gwrussys
Subjunctive	Present / Future	gwrylliv	gwryllyn	gwrylli	gwryllowgh	gwrello	gwrellons	gwreller
Subjunctive	Imperfect	gwrellen	gwrellen	gwrelles	gwrellewgh	gwrella	gwrellens	gwrellys
Imperative		—N/a	gwrem	gwra	gwrewgh	gwres	gwrens	—N/a

Verbal noun	Present participle	Past participle
gul	ow kul	gwrys

The verb mos “go, become” is irregular and has separate forms for the present perfect.

mos "go, become"
		1st person		2nd person		3rd person		Impersonal^{5}
		singular	plural	singular	plural	singular	plural	Impersonal^{5}
Indicative	Present / Future	av	en	edh	ewgh	a	ons	er
Indicative	Preterite	yth	ethen	ythys	ethewgh	eth	ethons	es, os
Indicative	Imperfect	en	en	es	ewgh	e	ens	es
Indicative	Present perfect	galsov	galson	galsos	galsowgh	gallas	galsons	—N/a
Indicative	Pluperfect	gylsen	gylsen	gylses	gylsewgh	galsa	gylsens	—N/a
Subjunctive	Present / Future	ylliv	yllyn	ylli	yllowgh	ello	ellons	eller
Subjunctive	Imperfect	ellen	ellen	elles	ellewgh	ella	gellens	ellss
Imperative		—N/a	deun	ke, a	keugh, eugh	es	ens	—N/a

Verbal noun	Present participle	Past participle
mos, mones	ow mos, ow mones	gyllys

Similarly, dos “come, arrive” is irregular and has present perfect forms.

dos "come, arrive"
		1st person		2nd person		3rd person		Impersonal
		singular	plural	singular	plural	singular	plural	Impersonal
Indicative	Present / Future	dov	deun	deudh	dewgh	deu	dons	deer
Indicative	Preterite	deuth	deuthen	deuthys	deuthewgh	deuth	deuthons	es, os
Indicative	Imperfect	den	den	des	dewgh	de	dens	des
Indicative	Present perfect	deuvev	deuven	deuves	deuvewgh	deuva	deuvons	deuves
Indicative	Pluperfect	dothyen	dothyen	dothyes	dothyewgh	dothya	dothyens	dothyes
Subjunctive	Present / Future	dyffiv	dyffyn	dyffi	dyffowgh	deffo	dyffons	deffer
Subjunctive	Imperfect	deffen	deffen	deffes	deffewgh	deffa	deffens	deffes
Imperative		—N/a	deun	deus, des	dewgh	des	dens	—N/a

Verbal noun	Present participle	Past participle
dos, dones	ow tos, ow tones	devedhys

The irregular verbs ri “give” and dri “bring” (alternatively, rei and drei) have similar conjugations. This table give the forms of ri from which the dri forms can be composed by adding an initial d, for example rov “I give” to drov “I bring”. The only exceptions to this are that the second person singular imperatives of dri are dro, doro and doroy and that, as usual, the ow of the present participle cause provection of the d to t to give ow tri.

ri "give"
		1st person		2nd person		3rd person		Impersonal
		singular	plural	singular	plural	singular	plural	Impersonal
Indicative	Present / Future	rov	ren	redh	rowgh	re	rons	rer
Indicative	Preterite	res	resen	resys	resowgh	ros	rosons	ros
Indicative	Imperfect	ren	ren	res	rewgh	ri	rens	res
Indicative	Pluperfect	rosen	rosen	roses	rosewgh	rosa	rosens	rosys
Subjunctive	Present / Future	rylliv	ryllyn	rylli	ryllowgh	rollo	rollons	roller
Subjunctive	Imperfect	rollen	rollen	rolles	rollewgh	rolla	rollens	rollys
Imperative		—N/a	ren	ro, roy	rewgh	res	rens	—N/a

Verbal noun	Present participle	Past participle
ri	ow ri	res

== Conjunctions ==
Certain conjunctions have an additional form used when followed by a vowel, such as ha “and” becoming hag and na “than” becoming nag.

== Prepositions ==
As in other Celtic languages, Cornish prepositions are simple or complex and may inflect to show person, number and gender. Historically, inflected prepositions derive from the contraction between a preposition and a personal pronoun.

Simple prepositions that inflect belong to one of three groups characterised by their use of the vowel a, o or i. Third person prepositional stems are sometimes slightly different from those of the first and second persons and affection sometimes occurs in the third person singular feminine. Dhe “to” and gans “with” are irregular.

			war “on”	rag “for”	orth “at”	dhe “to”	gans “with”
singular	1st person		warnav “on me”	ragov “for me”	orthiv “at me”	dhymm “to me”	genev “with me”
singular	2nd person		warnas “on you”	ragos “for you”	orthis “at you”	dhys “to you”	genes “with you”
singular	3rd person	masculine	warno “on him”	ragdho “for him”	orto “at him”	dhodho “to him”	ganso “with him”
singular	3rd person	feminine	warni “on her”	rygdhi “for her”	orti “at her”	dhedhi “to her”	gensi “with her”
plural	1st person		warnan “on us”	ragon “for us”	orthyn “at us”	dhyn “to us”	genen “with us”
plural	2nd person		warnowgh “on you”	ragowgh “for you”	orthowgh “at you”	dhywgh “to you”	genowgh “with you”
plural	3rd person		warna “on them”	ragdha “for them”	orta “at them”	dhedha “to them”	gansa “with them”

Complex prepositions inflect by means of interfixes, whereby the nominal second element is preceded by a pronominal form. This is similar to how instead can become in my stead in archaic English. Mutations may be triggered following the various pronominal forms as seen in the following table.

			erbynn “against”	yn kever “about”	a-govis “for the sake of”
singular	1st person		er ow fynn “against me”	yn ow kever, y’m kever “about me”	a’m govis “for my sake”
singular	2nd person		er dha bynn “against you”	yn dha gever, y’th kever “about you”	a’th kovis “for your sake”
singular	3rd person	masculine	er y bynn “against him”	yn y gever “about him”	a’y wovis “for his sake”
singular	3rd person	feminine	er hy fynn “against her”	yn hy kever “about her”	a’y govis “for her sake”
plural	1st person		er agan pynn “against us”	yn agan kever, y’gan kever “about us”	a’gan govis “for our sake”
plural	2nd person		er agas pynn “against you”	yn agas kever, y’gas kever “about you”	a’gas govis “for your sake”
plural	3rd person		er aga fynn “against them”	yn aga hever, y’ga hever “about them”	a’ga govis “for their sake”

== Numbers ==
=== Cardinal numbers ===
Similar to other Celtic languages, Cornish has an underlying vigesimal counting system. “Two”, “three” and “four” and derivative numbers have separate masculine (m.) and feminine (f.) forms.

base numeral			+10		× 10	
	m.	f.	+10		× 10	
0	mann		10	deg		—N/a
1	onan		11	unnek	10	deg
2	dew	diw	12	dewdhek	20	ugens
3	tri	teyr	13	tredhek	30	deg warn ugens
4	peswar	peder	14	peswardhek	40	dew-ugens
5	pymp		15	pymthek	50	hanterkans
6	hwegh		16	hwetek	60	tri-ugens
7	seyth		17	seytek	70	deg ha tri-ugens
8	eth		18	etek	80	peswar-ugens
9	naw		19	nownsek	90	dek ha peswar-ugens

The numbers 21 to 39 employ the connective warn “on the” to join the smaller number to the larger, for example onan warn ugens “21”, naw warn ugens “29” and unnek warn ugens “31”. From 41 onwards, the connecting word is ha “and”, as in onan ha dew-ugens “41”, pymthek ha dew-ugens “55” and nownsek ha peswar-ugens “99”.

Cardinal numbers used to form larger numbers include:

100	kans	1,000	mil	1,000,000	milvil

Beyond 100, it is still possible to use multiples of ugens, such as hwegh-ugens “120”. Kans “100”, mil “1,000” and milvil “1,000,000” are all masculine numbers, for example tri mil “3,000”.

=== Ordinal numbers ===
Ordinal numbers and their abbreviations are shown below. The majority of numbers employ the ordinal suffix -ves.

		10ves	degves		
1a	kynsa	11ves	unnegves		
2a	nessa	12ves	dewdhegves	20ves	ugensves
3a	tressa, tryja	13ves	tredhegves	30ves	degves warn ugens
4a	peswara	14ves	peswardhegves	40ves	dew-ugensves
5es	pympes	15ves	pymtegves	50ves	hanterkansves
6ves	hweghves	16ves	hwetegves	60ves	tri-ugensves
7ves	seythves	17ves	seytegves	70ves	degves ha tri-ugens
8ves	ethves	18ves	etegves	80ves	peswar-ugensves
9ves	nawves	19ves	nownsegves	90ves	degves ha peswar-ugens

Larger numbers also employ the suffix -ves.

100ves	kansves	1,000ves	milves	1,000,000ves	milvilves

In multi-word numbers, the initial smaller number joined with the connector takes the ordinal form, for example kynsa warn ugens “21st” and nownsegves ha peswar-ugens “99th” (not *onan warn ugensves or *nownsek ha peswar-ugensves). In multiword numbers that are not joined by connecting words, the final number takes the ordinal form, for example dew-ugensves “40th”, hwegh-ugenves “120th”, tri milves “3,000th”.

== Word order and focus ==
The default Cornish word order is verb–subject–object, although like most Celtic languages this is somewhat fluid. Cornish has a system of fronting constituents, in which parts of a sentence can be moved to the front for focus, rather than stressing them in situ as English does. This system has influenced the Anglo-Cornish dialect, heard in the distinctive questioning of dialect speakers such as “Goin’ in’ town are’ee?” and “’S bleddy ’tis”.

In description sentences of the verb bos ‘to be’, the complement is typically fronted:

Merryn ov vy.
Merryn am I
I'm Merryn.

Lowen es jy.
Happy were you
You were happy.

Other existence sentences of bos front the verb:

Yma hi ow kortos y’n gegin.
There.is she at wait.VN in.the kitchen
She's waiting in the kitchen.

Yth esa lyver war an estyllen.
VPART there.was book on the shelf
There was a book on the shelf. / A book was on the shelf.

Since Cornish prefers to use a ‘there is’ existence form of bos with indefinite objects (when not fronted for emphasis, that is), an object being definite or indefinite can result in different parts being fronted:

Y fydh ebost danvenys yn-mes ynno an kedhlow a vri.
VPART will.be email sent out in.it the information of relevance
An email will be sent out containing the relevant information. (lit. There’ll be an email sent out.)

An ebost a vydh danvenys yn-mes a-vorow.
the email SPART will.be sent out tomorrow
The email will be sent out tomorrow.

Y feu kath gwelys y’n lowarth.
VPART was cat seen in.the garden
A cat was seen in the garden. (lit. There was a cat seen.)

An gath a veu gwelys y’n lowarth.
the cat SPART was seen in.the garden
The cat was seen in the garden.

With other verbs, subject-fronted is the default unmarked word order. This still follows the default verb–subject–object order, since sentences of this kind were in origin relative clauses emphasising the subject:

My a ros lyver da dhe das Jowan de.
me RPART gave book good to father Jowan yesterday
I gave a good book to Jowan's father yesterday. (lit. It is me who gave a good book.)

When the sentence's object is a pronoun, it appears before the verb and after the particle a, although it can also appear after the verb for emphasis: My a’s gwel ‘I see her’, or My a’s gwel hi “I see her”. When auxiliary verbs are used, a possessive pronoun is used with the verbal noun: My a wra hy gweles ‘I see her’ (literally “I do her seeing”), or when stressed, My a wra hy gweles hi “I see her”. In both instances, colloquial spoken Cornish may drop all but the suffixed pronouns, to give My a wel hi and My a wra gweles hi, although this is rarely written.

In questions and negative sentences, an interrogative particle and negative particle are used, respectively. These are generally fronted in neutral situations:

A wruss’ta ri an lyver dhodho de?
IPART you.did’you VN.give the book to.him yesterday
Did you give him the book yesterday?

Ny wrug vy ri an lyver dhodho.
NPART I.did I VN.give the book to.him
I didn't give him the book.

Subject pronouns can be placed before a negative particle for emphasis: My ny vynnav kewsel Sowsnek ’I will not speak English’ or ’As for me, I will not speak English’ (said to be Dolly Pentreath's last words).

=== Fronting for emphasis ===
Besides the “neutral” structures given above, elements of Cornish sentences can be fronted to give emphasis, or when responding to a question with requested information. Fronting involves moving the element to the beginning of the sentence. English typically achieves this by modifying tone or intonation.

There are two particles involved in fronting. The particle a is actually a relative particle used when the subject or direct object of a sentence is fronted. If anything else is fronted, usually adverbials or information headed by prepositions, the particle used is y (yth before a vowel).

Question	Response
Piw a brenas an bara?; Who bought the bread?	Ev a’n prenas.; He bought it. (lit. It was him who bought it)
A wrug Mary y brena?; Did Mary buy it?	Na wrug, Bob a’n prenas.; No, Bob bought it. (lit. It was Bob who bought it)
Pyth a wruss’ta prena?; What did you buy?	Keus a brenis.; I bought cheese. (lit. It was cheese that I bought)
A wruss’ta prena hemma?; Did you buy this one?	Ny wrug vy prena hemma; henna a brenis.; I didn't buy this one; I bought that one. (lit. It was that one that I bought)
Pyth a wruss’ta gul?; What did you do?	Prena an keus a wrugav.; I bought the cheese. (lit. It was buying the cheese that I did)
Peur hwruss’ta y brena?; When did you buy it?	Dhe bymp eur y’n prenis.; I bought it at five o’clock. (lit. It was at five o’clock that I bought it)
Ple hwruss’ta y brena?; Where did you buy it?	Y’n worvarghas y’n prenis.; I bought it in the supermarket. (lit. It was in the supermarket that I bought it)

== Nominal syntax ==
Determiners precede the noun they modify, while adjectives generally follow it. A modifier that precedes its head noun often causes a mutation, and adjectives following a feminine noun are lenited. Thus:

- benyn (”a woman”)
- an venyn (”the woman”; benyn is lenited because it is feminine)
- tebel venyn (”a wicked woman”; benyn is lenited because tebel “wicked” precedes it)
- benyn gonnyk (”a smart woman”; konnyk is lenited because it follows a feminine noun)

Genitive relationships are expressed by apposition. The genitive in Cornish is formed by putting two noun phrases next to each other, the possessor coming second. So English “The cat's mother”, or “mother of the cat”, corresponds to Cornish mamm an gath – literally, “mother the cat”; “the project manager's telephone number” is niver pellgowser menystrer an towl – literally, “number telephone manager the project”. Only the last noun in a genitive sequence can take the definite article.
