= Breton mutations =

Consonant mutation in the Breton language

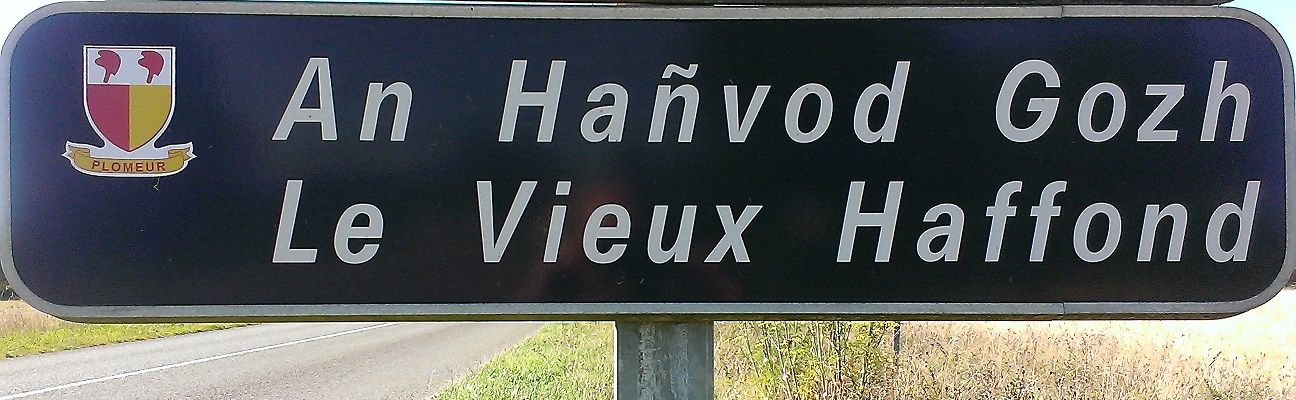
A bilingual road sign in Breton and French, showing soft mutation of kozh to gozh

Like all modern Celtic languages, Breton is characterised by initial consonant mutations, which are changes to the initial sound of a word caused by certain syntactic or morphological environments. In addition, Breton, like French, has a number of purely phonological sandhi features caused when certain sounds come into contact with others.

The mutations are divided into four main groups, according to the changes they cause: soft mutation (Breton kemmadurioù dre vlotaat), hard mutation (kemmadurioù dre galetaat), spirant mutation (kemmadurioù c'hwezhadenniñ) and mixed mutation (kemmadurioù mesket). There are also a number of defective (or incomplete) mutations which affect only certain words or certain letters.

== Summary of sound changes ==
The main mutations cause the following changes:

| Unmutated | Soft | Spirant | Hard | Mixed |
|---|---|---|---|---|
| P /p/ | B /b/ | F /f/ | | |
| T /t/ | D /d/ | Z /z/ | | |
| K /k/ | G /ɡ/ | C'h /x/ | | |
| B /b/ | V /v/ | | P /p/ | V /v/ |
| D /d/ | Z /z/ or /ð/ | | T /t/ | T /t/ |
| G /ɡ/ | C'h /ɣ/ | | K /k/ | C'h /x/ |
| Gw /ɡʷ/ | W /w/ | | Kw /kʷ/ | W /w/ |
| M /m/ | V /v/ | | Mh /ʰm/ | V /v/ |

== Functions of mutations ==
The role which initial mutations play in Breton grammar can be divided into three categories (which are not mutually exclusive):

- Linking (or contact) mutations – these occur systematically after certain words called mutators, of which there are around 100 in Breton.

tad "father" → da dad "your father"
mamm "mother" → div vamm "two mothers"

- Gender-number-distinctive mutations – these occur after the articles and in postposed adjectives to mark gender and number.

paotr "boy" (m.): ar paotr brav "the nice boy", but ar baotred vrav "the nice boys"
bro "country" (f.): ar vro vihan "the small country" but ar broioù bihan "the small countries"
tad and mamm: an tad kozh "the grandfather" and ar vamm gozh "the grandmother"

- Mutations of recognition – these mark the distinction between homophones (e.g. e "his" & he "her") and are useful in the comprehension of the spoken language.

e vreur "his brother" but he breur "her brother"
o zi "their house" but ho ti "your house"

== Soft mutation ==
The soft mutation is by far the most frequent mutation in Breton, both in terms of the number of consonants it affects and the number of environments in which it occurs.

=== Environments ===
==== After definite and indefinite articles ====
The definite article al/an/ar and the indefinite ul/un/ur cause the soft mutation of:

- Most feminine singular nouns:

ur vamm "a mother"

- Masculine plural nouns denoting people:

ar C'hallaoued "the Frenchmen"

Nouns beginning with d- and a few others do not mutate after the articles. A notable exception is dor ("door") → an nor.

==== After proclitics ====
The following grammatical words cause mutations to a following word:

- The prepositions da, dre, a, war, dindan, eme, en ur:

da Gernev "to Cornwall"

- The interrogative pronoun pe "what":

pe zen? "what man?"

- The possessive pronouns da "your", e "his":

da benn "your head"
e dad "his father"

- The verbal particles a, ne, na, ez, ra, en em:

tud a welan "I see people"
na ganit ket "do not sing"
ra zeuio buan en-dro "may he return quickly"

- The numerals daou "two (masculine)", div "two (feminine)":

'div blac'h "two girls"

- The conjunctions pa "if, when", pe "or", tra "while"

kozh e oa pa varvas "he was old when he died"
den pe zen "one person or another"

- The adverb re "too":

re vihan "too small"

- The pronouns holl "all", re "those, ones", hini "that, one":

an holl diez "all the houses"

==== After adjectives and nouns ====
The soft mutation occurs in:

- Adjectives following feminine singular nouns:

kador gaer "beautiful chair"

- Adjectives following masculine plural nouns referring to people:

breudeur vat "good brothers"

- Nouns following adjectives:

e berr gomzoù "in few words"

These mutations are limited. When the first word ends in a vowel or -l, -r, -m, -n it causes the soft mutation wherever possible, but when the first word ends in any other consonant only the consonants g-, gw-, m-, b- change in the following words.

== Spirant mutation ==
=== Environments ===
The mutation occurs following:

- The possessive pronouns he "her", o "their, ma/va "my" and (in the Trégorrois dialect) hon "our":

he zad "her father"
o faotr "their son"
ma c'hi "my dog"

- The numerals tri "three (masc.)", teir "three (fem.)", pevar "four (masc.)", peder "four (fem.)", nav "nine":

tri zi "three houses"
nav fesk "nine fish"

In the spoken language the spirant mutation is usually replaced with the soft mutation after numerals.

=== Defective mutations ===
- The mutation of t and k occurs following the infixed pronoun 'm "me" (am, em with verbal particles), da'm "to my" and em "in my":

em zi "in my house"

- Mutation of k occurs following hor "our":

hor c'harr "our car"

- The word Pask "Easter" becomes Fask following the days Sul "Sunday" and Lun "Monday".

== Hard mutation ==
=== Environments ===
The mutation is caused by:

- Possessive pronoun ho "your (plural)":

ho preur "your brother"

- Infixed pronoun 'z "your (singular)" (az, ez with verbal particles), da'z "to your (sg.)", ez "in your (sg.)":

ez taouarn "in your hands"
da'z pag "to your boat"
va breur az kwelas "my brother saw you"

== Mixed mutation ==
=== Environments ===
The mixed mutation occurs after:

- The verbal particles e and o

emaon o vont da Vrest "I am going to Brest"
krediñ a ran e teuio "I believe that he will come"

- The conjunction ma "if"

laouen e vefen ma teufe "I would be happy if he came"

== Mutations and external sandhi ==
All of the consonant mutations described above began as simple phonological processes in the Common Brittonic language from which Breton arose and became standardised as grammatical processes as the language developed. Similar phonological processes continued to affect Breton and cause changes to word-initial sounds, but they are usually applied based on the phonology of the preceding word and not on its function. Because of this, they cannot be described as true initial mutations and are more properly aspects of external sandhi.

=== Nasalisation ===
The true nasal mutation which occurs in Welsh never occurred in Breton and Cornish, where it was replaced by the Spirant Mutation (compare Welsh fy nghi "my dog" with Breton ma c'hi). But there was assimilation of the voiced plosives, particularly b, d to a preceding nasal and this was often written in Middle Breton.

Today it is only written with an nor "the door" but can still be heard dialectally in other words, e.g. an den /an nẽːn/ "one" (lit. "the person") and bennak(et) "some" /mˈnak(ət)/.

=== Spirantisation ===
Today, a number of nouns beginning with k change to c'h following the articles ar "the" and ur "a":

ar c'hastell "the castle"
ur c'hezeg "a horse"

Although this is the same process seen in the spirant mutation (e.g. following hor "our"), it is really an external sandhi which has become fixed in writing.

=== "Interchangeable" consonants ===
Breton has a series of 'interchangeable' consonants, composed of plosives and fricatives. When these sounds occur word-finally, they may be pronounced voiceless or voiced depending on the word that follows:

- The sounds are voiceless when the word is followed by a voiceless sound or a pause.
- The sounds are voiced when the following word begins with a voiced consonant or a vowel.

The table below shows the 'interchangeable' consonants:

| Voiceless | Voiced | Orthography |
|---|---|---|
| /p/ | /b/ | ⟨p / b⟩ |
| /t/ | /d/ | ⟨t / d⟩ |
| /k/ | /ɡ/ | ⟨k / g⟩ |
| /f/ | /v/ | ⟨f / v⟩ |
| /ʃ/ | /ʒ/ | ⟨ch / j⟩ |
| /x/ | /ɣ/ | ⟨c'h⟩ |
| /s/ | /z/ | ⟨s(h) / z(h)⟩ |

These changes are never written but occur regularly, regardless of how the final consonant is spelled:

beleg mat "good priest" /bɛːlɛɡ mɑːt/ vs. beleg kozh /bɛːlɛk koːs/
dek den "ten people" /deːɡ dẽːn/ vs. dek tad /deːk tɑːt/

==== Exceptions ====
- When two equivalent or identical consonants come together (e.g. p/b or z/z), both consonants become voiceless:

dek gwele "ten beds" /deːk kweːle/
bloaz 'zo "a year ago" /blwas so/

- Some words ending in s/z or ch/j resist voicing.

More information on this phenomenon can be found in the thesis of François Falc'hun: Le système consonantique du Breton.

== Orthography of mutations ==
In Old and Middle Breton, it was extremely rare to write the consonant mutations. Around the 17th century, the Jesuits started to learn Breton and introduced the writing of mutations.

Sometimes, the mutated letter is written before the radical letter in the style of the Gaelic languages, to make recognition easier. This is largely confined to proper nouns (e.g. Itron vMaria "the virgin Maria" is pronounced /ˌitˈrõːn ˈvarˌja/).

Some processes which are properly part of external sandhi have become crystallised in the written language, whilst others have not.
