= A Handbook of the Cornish Language =

1904 book by Henry Jenner

A Handbook of the Cornish Language is a book written by Henry Jenner in 1904, being widely considered the first work concerning the Cornish revival.
