= Provection =

Linguistics term

Provection (from Latin: provectio "advancement") is a technical term of linguistics with two main senses.

(1) The carrying over of the final consonant of a word to the beginning of the following word. Examples in English include Middle English an ewete becoming a newt and Middle English an ekename becoming nickname. The term is obsolete in this sense; in modern terminology the process is usually called metanalysis or rebracketing, which also cover transposition in the reverse direction, as with Middle English a noumpere to Modern English an umpire.

(2) In Insular Celtic languages, the devoicing of a consonant, specifically the change of voiced consonants to the corresponding voiceless consonants, e.g. of [g], [d], [b], [v] to [k], [t], [p], [f] respectively, under the influence of an adjacent voiceless consonant. Examples in Welsh include [g] > [k], as with teg "fair", which before a superlative suffix with the earlier form -haf (with voiceless [h]), gives tecaf "fairest". This term is also used for a grammatically triggered process with a similar effect as in, for example, Breton bro "land" but ho pro "your (plural) land".

The term provection has also been used for a variety of other processes in Celtic with similar effects, such as when two successive voiced plosives were replaced by a single voiceless plosive (Welsh *meid-din from Latin matutinum "morning" becoming Welsh (ers) meitin "a while ago"), or when a voiced plosive was devoiced before a voiceless one and merged with it (Welsh pob "every" + peth "thing" becoming popeth "everything"). A further process for which the term has been used is for the change of a voiced fricative to a voiced stop after a resonant consonant, as in the case of Proto-Welsh *benðixt from Latin benedictio "blessing" becoming Welsh bendith. A catalogue of such effects is given in the historical linguistic text A Welsh grammar by J. Morris Jones, and in A concise comparative Celtic grammar by Henry Lewis and Holger Pedersen. (For a brief account see also Ball (1993: 309).).

The term is used by linguists both for the historical processes which give rise to a change of pronunciation, and for their legacy, the processes which occur when words or morphemes of the appropriate form are brought together in continuous speech or writing. In the earlier history of the Goidelic languages, some changes of pronunciation comparable to those in British Celtic occurred, and the term is also used to label them, but those processes have no counterparts in the grammars of the surviving modern Goidelic languages, Irish and Scottish Gaelic.

== See also ==
- Fortition
