= Interfix =

Type of affix

An interfix or linking element is a part of a word that is placed between two morphemes (such as two roots or a root and a suffix) and lacks a semantic meaning.

== Examples ==
=== Formation of compound words ===
In German, the interfix -s- has to be used between certain nouns in compound words, but not all, such as Arbeitszimmer ("workroom") as opposed to Schlafzimmer ("bedroom"). This originates from the masculine and neuter genitive singular suffix -s. German has many other interfixes, for example -es-, -(e)n-, -er- and -e-. Not all of them originate from the genitive. Likewise, it is often stated that German interfixes originated from plural forms, when in fact German plural forms and linking forms developed parallel to each other and are only partly similar by coincidence.

In Dutch, the interfix -e- (schwa) sometimes can be traced back to the original form of the first part ending in an -e that has been lost in the present day form: zielerust ("peace of mind") was derived in Middle Dutch from ziele ("soul") and rust ("rest, peace"), but modern Dutch has ziel for "soul". In other compounds the -e- stems from a case suffix: petekind ("godchild") from peet ("godfather") and kind ("child"). The very common interfixes -s- and -en- originally were genitive suffixes. The much less frequent -er- in compounds can be seen as the remnant of an original plural suffix: rundergehakt, "ground beef" from rund, plural runderen "bovine(s)".

In English, when technical compound words are formed from non-technical roots, an -o- interfix is sometimes used, as o has come to be seen as a connecting vowel (speed-o-meter, mile-o-meter) by analogy to tacho-meter, odo-meter, compounds of which the first part comes from an Ancient Greek noun whose stem includes o.

In Swedish, compound nouns are written as one word, and interfixes are very common. -s- is frequently used in this way, as in fabriksarbetare, which consists of fabrik ("factory") and arbetare ("worker"). Examples of other interfixes are -e-, as in when familj and far ("family" and "father") become familjefar, and -a-, when viking and by ("viking" and "village") become vikingaby. However, just like in Norwegian, not all compound words are written with an interfix. For example stenålder, which consists of sten ("stone") and ålder ("age"). Some words ending in a vowel lose the last letter. For example arbetarklass ("working class") consists of arbetare ("worker") and klass ("class").

Norwegian is closely related to Swedish and has a similar pattern, but uses interfixing somewhat more moderately. Examples: arbeid + rom = arbeidsrom ("workroom"), but fabrikk + arbeider = fabrikkarbeider and familie + far = familiefar. The most common interfix is -s-, but there are examples with -e-: barn + hage = barnehage ("kindergarten"), and bjørn + hi = bjørnehi ("bear hive" / "bear's nest").

In Serbo-Croatian, interfixes -o- and -e- are obligatory when forming a compound. For example, brod + gradilište = brodogradilište ("shipyard"), but kuća + pazitelj = kućepazitelj ("concierge"). Unless an interfix is added, the new-formed word is considered to be a word-joining, such as zimzelen (zima + zelen, "evergreen").

In Russian the most popular interfixes are letters -o- and -e- (Russian letters). For example: the word паровоз (пар-о-воз) — "parovoz" (par-o-voz) means "locomotive"; par means "steam" and voz means "to carry".

== See also ==
- Compound
- Linking and intrusive R
- Sandhi
- Thematic vowel
