= Going-to future =

Grammatical construction

The going-to future is a grammatical construction used in English to refer to various types of future occurrences. It is made using appropriate forms of the expression to be going to. It is an alternative to other ways of referring to the future in English, such as the future construction formed with will (or shall) – in some contexts the different constructions are interchangeable, while in others they carry somewhat different implications.

Constructions analogous to the English going-to future are found in some other languages, including French, Spanish, Swiss German, and some varieties of Arabic.

== Origin ==
The going-to future originated in the late 15th century by the extension of the spatial sense of the verb go to a temporal sense (a common change, the same phenomenon can be seen in the preposition before). From a 1483 publication pertaining to Adam of Eynsham, a medieval English chronicler, an instance of this construction is present:

Thys onhappy sowle..was goyng to (Note: "goyng" is an obsolete orthographic variation of "going") be broughte into helle for the synne and onleful lustys of her body.

The original construction involved physical movement with an intention, such as "I am going [outside] to harvest the crop." The location later became unnecessary, and the expression was reinterpreted to represent a near future.

== Contracted forms ==
The going to future construction is frequently contracted in colloquial English, with the colloquial form gonna and the other variations of it resulting from a relaxed pronunciation. Furthermore, in some forms of English, the copula may also be omitted. Hence "You're going to be" could be said as "You're gonna be" or just "You gonna be". In the grammatical first person, I'm gonna (which is, in full, I am going to) may further contract to I'm'n'a /ˈaɪmənə/ or Imma /ˈaɪmə/.

These contracted forms can provide a distinction between the spatial and temporal senses of the expression: "I'm gonna swim" explicitly carries the temporal meaning of futurity, as opposed to the spatial meaning of "I'm going [now] [in order] to swim", or "I'm going [in the pool] to swim".

== Formation ==
The going-to idiom, used to express futurity is a semi-modal verb that consists of a form of the copula verb be, the word going followed by the word "to", for instance is going to. Like other modals, it is followed by the base infinitive of the main verb (compare with "ought to".) (An alternative description is that it uses the verb go in the progressive aspect, most commonly in present progressive form, serving as an auxiliary verb and having the to-infinitive phrase as its complement. However this description fails to take into account sentences in which the main verb is elided, such as "Yes, he's going to.") It can be put into question and negative forms according to the normal rules of English grammar.

Some examples:

- The boys are going to fight. (subject the boys + copula are + going to + base-infinitive fight)
- I'm going to try the wine. (subject I + copula am + going to + base-infinitive phrase try the wine)
- He's not going to make it. (negative form, copula negated with the addition of not)
- Are you going to bring Sue? (interrogative form, featuring subject–auxiliary inversion)
- Aren't they (more formal: Are they not) going to wear coats? (negative interrogative form)
- We were going to tell you earlier. (past form of the going-to future, formed with the past copula were)
- Yes, I'm going to. (main verb is elided).

That the verb go as used in this construction is distinct from the ordinary lexical verb go can be seen in the fact that the two can be used together: "I'm going to go to the store now." Also the lexical use of going to is not subject to the contractions to gonna and similar: "I'm gonna get his autograph" clearly implies the future meaning (intention), and not the meaning "I'm going [somewhere] [in order] to get his autograph."

== Usage ==
The going-to future is one of several constructions used in English to refer to future events (see Future tense § English). The basic form of the going-to construction is in fact in the present tense; it is often used when the speaker wishes to draw a connection between present events, situations, or intentions and expected future events or situations, i.e. to express the present relevance of the future occurrence. It may therefore be described as expressing prospective aspect, in the same way that the present perfect (which refers to the present relevance of past occurrences) is said to express retrospective (or perfect) aspect.

There is no clear delineation between contexts where going to is used and those where other forms of future expression (such as the will/shall future, or the ordinary present tense) are used. Different forms are often interchangeable. Some general points of usage are listed below.

- The going-to future is relatively informal; in more formal contexts it may be replaced by the will/shall future, or by expressions such as plan(s) to, expect(s) to, is/are expected to, etc.
- The ordinary present tense can be used to refer to the future when the context (or time adverbs) indicate futurity, and the reference is to some planned action: "We are painting the house tomorrow" (this could also be expressed with "... going to paint ..."). It is usually the present progressive that is used, as in the preceding example, but the simple present can also be used, particularly for precisely scheduled events: "My train leaves at 4.15." (See also the obligatory use of present tense with future meaning in some dependent clauses.)
- When the expression of futurity is combined with that of some modality, such as obligation or possibility, a modal verb (not marked specifically for the future) may be used: "We must/can do it tomorrow." There is also the expression am to etc., which implies obligation or expectation as in "He is to deliver it this afternoon" (see the following section), and the expression to be about to (also to be due to and similar), implying immediacy ("I am about to leave").
- The going-to form sometimes indicates imminence, but sometimes does not; and it sometimes indicates intention, but sometimes does not (compare "It's going to rain", which expresses imminence but not intention, and "I'm going to visit Paris someday", which expresses intention but not imminence).
- The will future is often used for announcing a decision at the time when it is made, while going to is more likely for a plan already in existence: compare "All right, I'll help her" and "Yes, I'm going to help her".
- The will future is used more often than going to in conditional sentences of the "first conditional" type: "If it rains, you'll get wet" (although going to is also sometimes found in such sentences).
- In some contexts the going-to form can express unconditionality while the will form expresses conditionality ("Don't sit on that rock, it's going to fall" means it's going to fall regardless of what you do, while "Don't sit on that rock, it will fall" means that it will fall conditional on your sitting on it). But in some contexts (particularly with "future in the past" – see the following section) the reverse can be true ("After 1962 ended, I would be a star" unconditionally describes what subsequently did happen, while "After 1962 ended, I was going to be a star" describes only intention).

=== The be + to construction ===
English has a construction formed by a form of the copula be followed by to and the bare infinitive of the main verb (i.e. the copula followed by the to-infinitive). This is similar in form to the going-to future, with the omission of the word going. In the be + to construction only finite, indicative (or past subjunctive) forms of the copula can appear – that is, the copula used cannot be "be" itself, but one of the forms am, is, are, was, were (possibly contracted in some cases).

The meaning of this construction is to indicate that something is expected to happen at a future time (usually in the near future), as a result of either some duty (deontic modality) or some set plan. For example:

- I'm to report to the principal this afternoon. (duty)
- The Prime Minister is to visit the West Bank. (plan)
- Troops are to be sent to war-torn Darfur. (plan; note passive voice)

In headline language the copula may be omitted, e.g. "Prime Minister to visit West Bank".

Compared with the will future, the be + to construction may be less expressive of a prediction, and more of the existence of a plan or duty. Thus "John will go ..." implies a belief on the speaker's part that this will occur, while "John is to go ..." implies knowledge on the speaker's part that there exists a plan or obligation entailing such an occurrence (the latter statement will not be falsified if John ends up not going). The be + to construction may therefore resemble a renarrative mood in some ways.

When was or were is used as the copula, the plan or duty is placed in past time (and quite often implies that it was not carried out). It may also be used simply as a way of expressing "future in the past" (see the following section). For example:

I was to visit my aunt, but I missed the train. (past plan, not in fact fulfilled)
This was the battle at which they were finally to triumph. (future in the past, also: they would finally triumph)

The construction also appears in condition clauses:

If you are to go on holiday, you need to work hard. (i.e. working hard is necessary for going on holiday)
If he was/were to speak, it would change things significantly. (also if he spoke)

When the verb in such a clause is were, it can be inverted and the conjunction if dropped: "Were he to speak, ..." For details of these constructions, see English conditional sentences.

== Expressions using going to as relative future form ==
The going-to construction, as well as other constructions used in English refer to future events, can be used not only to express the future relative to the present time, but also sometimes to express the future relative to some other time of reference (see relative tense).

Some reference points appear more suitable for use in relative future than others. The following are universally attested:

- Future relative to a past reference point is formed using the past tense of the copula + going to, e.g. "I was going to eat dinner" (instead of the present "I am going to eat dinner"). This may express past intention ("I was going to eat dinner") or prediction ("It was going to rain").
- Ongoing intention or prediction existing up to the present time is also attested, based on the present perfect of the copula + going to. For example, "I have been going to do it for some time" (but I haven't gotten around to it) or "It has been going to rain all afternoon" (but it hasn't started). Similar sentences can be formed on the past perfect (e.g. "I had been going to eat").
- Future relative to a past subjunctive is attested in a condition clause: "If I was/were going to eat..."

The following relative futures are more nebulous:

- Future event relative to a future reference point. In theory, one could string two going-to futures together ("I'm going to be going to eat"), or, to more easily disambiguate them, use the modular future for the reference point ("I will be going to eat"). A strong example might be one that incorporates the precise difference in time between the reference point and the event: "We can't visit Louise in June, because she'll be going to have a baby three weeks from then."
  - However, it is not clear that English speakers would agree on the naturalness of this construction or on the interpretation. In fact, some have argued that such a construction does not occur in English or other natural languages with the intended meaning; the latter "going to" in these constructions may signify the main verb to go as in "to move from one place to another."
  - Others have speculated about this grammatical lacuna. Hans Reichenbach's scheme of tenses identifies a sequence S-R-E, i.e. speech act followed by reference point followed by event, but it does not correspond to an English tense in a strict sense. Latin had a form that may have corresponded to this use, e.g. in the phrase "abiturus ero", which could be translated "I shall be one of those who will leave." Other authors have argued that the future of the future is "not attested in natural languages." The South Indian language Kannada has a posterior future tense that might correspond to this usage, but reportedly denotes "to need to."
  - Some have speculated that the lacuna, if it exists, may have a semantic origin; that is, the future is already difficult to specify, and there is simply little occasion in human experience for using a future event as a reference point for a further future event.
- Future relative to a hypothetical (conditional) state: "I would be going to eat." A similar interpretation to future relative to future may arise instead: "I would be going (on my way) to eat."
- Future relative to unspecified time: the infinitive (or occasionally present subjunctive) of the copula can be used, e.g. "To be going to die is not a good feeling." The infinitive can be used in a variety of constructions, in line with the normal uses of the English infinitive; for example, "He is said to be going to resign." Speakers may differ on the interpretation of such constructions.

Relative future is also possible for a limited number of uses of the modular "will" or "shall" in their so-called past tense forms, respectively "would" and "should" (see future in the past).

Periphrastic phrases may be able to express some relative future meanings that are otherwise unattested. For example, the phrase "to be about to" means that in the very near future, one will do something. Hence, "I will be about to leave" expresses a future event relative to a future reference point.

Another construction, "to be to", also has similar denotations in some constructions, e.g. "I was to see the Queen the next day." However, its use is restricted to simple finite forms of the copula, namely the present indicative ("I am to do it"), the past indicative ("I was to do it"), and the past subjunctive ("if I were to do it" or "were I to do it"; these last have somewhat different implications, as described at English conditional sentences).

== Related forms in creoles ==
Some creole languages have a marker of future time reference (or irrealis mood) modeled on the verb "go" as found in the going-to future of the English superstrate.

Examples include Jamaican English Creole /de go hapm/ "is going to happen", /mi a go ɹon/ "I am going to run", Belizean Creole English /gwein/ or /gouɲ/, Gullah Uh gwine he'p dem "I'm going to help them", Hawaiian Creole English /Ai gon bai wan pickup/ "I gonna buy one pickup", /Da gai sed hi gon fiks mi ap wit wan blain deit/ "The guy said he gonna fix me up with one blind date", and Haitian Creole /Mwen va fini/ "I go finish".

== Analogous forms in other languages ==
Similarly to English, the French verb aller ("to go") can be used as an auxiliary verb to create a near-future tense (le futur proche). For example, the English sentence "I am going to do it tomorrow" can be translated by Je vais le faire demain (literally "I go it to do tomorrow"; French does not have a distinct present progressive form, so je vais stands for both "I go" and "I am going"). As in English, the French form can generally be replaced by the present or future tense: Je le fais demain ("I am doing it tomorrow") or Je le ferai demain ("I will do it tomorrow").

Likewise, the Spanish verb ir ("to go") can be used to express the future: Mi padre va a llegar mañana ("My father is going to arrive tomorrow"). Here the preposition a is used, analogous to the English to; the French construction does not have this.

In Welsh, a Brittonic and Celtic language, the verb mynd ("to go") is used much like the English verb go. In the sentence dw i'n mynd i wneud e yfory ("I am going to do it tomorrow") mynd is followed by the preposition i ("to, for") which is itself followed by the verb gwneud ("to do") in mutated form (hence the missing initial 'g'). This forms a going-to future as found in English.

The form is well established in urban varieties of Irish, using Tá (the Irish verb 'to be'), the preposition 'chun' ("to", "towards") and the verbal noun moved by transformation to the end of the verbal phrase. So "tá mé chun an bus a thógáil" - ("I am going to take the bus"). It is much less used in rural dialects, where the plain future tense is still preferred.

== See also ==
- Grammatical aspect
- Grammatical tense
- Shall and will
