= English markers of habitual aspect =

The habitual aspect is a form of expression connoting repetition or continuous existence of a state of affairs. In standard English, for present reference there is no special grammatical marker of habitual aspect; the simple present is used, as in I go there (every Thursday). However, for past reference English uses the simple past form or either of two marked constructions: used to as in we used to go there (every Thursday), and would as in back then we would go there (every Thursday).

African-American Vernacular English uses be (habitual be) to indicate that performance of the verb is of a habitual nature.

== Would ==
The form [would + infinitive] is employed to talk about a habit or frequent action in a former time. One usually applies [would + infinitive] for the past habitual when one is telling a story about the past.

- When I was a kid, we would often have a drink after class on a Monday.
- When I lived in Romania, we would go to a little bar near our house.

The past habitual employment of would requires an accompanying indication of the time of occurrence (more specifically than simply before the present): e.g., Last year we would go there frequently, but not simply We would go there frequently.

This application of would to mark the past habitual is distinct from each of several other uses of would: as a tense marker for future in the past (after that experience we would not try it again for the next three years); as a conditional mood marker (I would do it if I could); and as a modal verb of politeness (Would you open the door, please?).

== Used to ==
The idiomatic phrase used to expresses past states or past habitual actions (usually with the implication that they are no longer so), as in I used to eat ice cream, or a state of accustomedness, as in I am used to eating ice cream or I am used to ice cream in a bowl. (These are in addition to the non-idiomatic combination of to use in the passive voice with an infinitive of purpose, as in A spoon is used to eat ice cream from a bowl.)

In the first case—the past habitual verbal form—it is followed by the infinitive (that is, the full expression consists of the verb used plus the to-infinitive). The expression used to refers to habits or frequent actions in a former time, especially ones not done in the present. Thus the statement I used to go to college means that the speaker formerly habitually went to college, and normally implies that this is no longer the case. Less often, this verb form is employed to identify states in the past which are no longer true. For example:

- I used to have short hair (but now I have long hair).
- He used to read (but now he doesn't read).
- They used to live in Iran (but now they live in England).

This verb form has a phonological distinction: used is pronounced /juːst/, in contrast to the ordinary verb use /juːz/ and its past form used /juːzd/ (as in I used your scissors this morning).

Used to is typically employed without a specific indication of the time of occurrence—e.g., We used to go there has the same meaning as We used to go there often.

[Used to + infinitive] expresses the lexical verb’s habitual aspect in the past tense, and is in the indicative mood and active voice. In informal spoken English questions or negative statements, it is treated like neither a modal nor an auxiliary verb, but as a past tense of an ordinary verb. (Though informal, especially when the "d" is pronounced, no direct formal equivalent exists.) Used to forms questions and negatives using did: Did he use(d) to come here? He didn't use(d) to come here. Note that some prescriptivists argue that one should employ 'use' and not 'used' when employed with did:

- Did you use to be a worker?
- Did he use to study in Germany?
- He didn't use to like cake, but he does now.
- I didn't use to want to have an expensive villa.

However, it is more standard to ask questions and make negative forms using simple past. Used to implies the idea that something was an old habit that stopped in the past. It indicates that something was often repeated in the past, but it does not usually occur in the present. Used to can also be used to talk about past realities or generalizations which are no longer true. Both simple past and used to can refer to past habits, past facts and past generalizations; however, used to is preferred when emphasizing these forms of past repetition in positive forms. On the other hand, when forming questions or negative sentences, modern prescriptive grammar dictates that the simple past is better.

The verbal use of used to should not be confused with second case—the adjectival form—of the same expression, meaning "familiar with, accustomed to", as in I am used to this, we must get used to the cold.

- Verbal form: [used to + (verb)]
- Adjectival form: [(to be) + used to + (complement)]

When the adjectival form is followed by a verb, the gerund is used: I am used to going to college in the mornings.

I used to drink black coffee means that in the past I drank black coffee, but now I don't. Used to describes an action that did happen, but does not happen now.

- When I was younger I used to play with toys, but I don't any more.
- Before I passed my driving test, I used to cycle.
- I am used to something.
- I am used to drinking black coffee.

In contrast, I am used to drinking black coffee means that at first drinking black coffee was unusual, but now it has gotten familiar. [to be + used to] tells of a state of affairs that was unfamiliar, but that the speaker/writer is now accustomed to (also sometimes a state of affairs that was once hard and is now simple or easy). I am accustomed to black coffee has the same meaning.

- It took me a while, but now I'm used to using this new computer.
- I'm getting used to the abnormal smell in the factory.
- I'll never get used to the heat in Iraq.

In Longman Language Activator usual uses of used to are shown in the below list:

- used to do something
- there used to be
- never used to be
- didn't use to do something
- used not to do something

== Habitual aspect African-American, Caribbean, and South-West Hiberno English Dialects ==
Habitual be, also called invariant be, is the use of an uninflected be in African-American English (AAE), Caribbean English and Hiberno-English to mark habitual or extended actions in place of the Standard English inflected forms of be, such as is and are. This is referred to as the habitual aspect of the verb "to be". In AAE, use of be indicates that a subject repeatedly does an action or embodies a trait. In General American English, however, the use of (an inflection of) be means only that an individual has done an action in a particular tense, such as in the statement "She was singing" (the habitual is "She sings").

It is a common misconception that AAE simply replaces is with be across all tenses, with no added meaning. In fact, AAE uses be to mark a habitual grammatical aspect, which is not explicitly distinguished in Standard English. For example, to be singing means to sing habitually, not to presently be singing. In one experiment, five- and six-year-old children were shown drawings of Elmo eating cookies while Cookie Monster (a character in the popular United States children's television show Sesame Street who habitually eats cookies) looked on. Thirty-five of the children were AAE-speaking and 18 were Standard English speaking. Both AAE-speaking and Standard English speaking subjects agreed that Elmo is eating cookies, but the AAE-speaking children said that Cookie Monster be eating cookies.
