= Conditional perfect =

Grammatical construction

The conditional perfect is a grammatical construction that combines the conditional mood with perfect aspect. A typical example is the English would have written. The conditional perfect is used to refer to a hypothetical, usually counterfactual, event or circumstance placed in the past, contingent on some other circumstance (again normally counterfactual, and also usually placed in the past). Like the present conditional (a form like would write), the conditional perfect typically appears in the apodosis (the main clause, expressing the consequent) in a conditional sentence.

== English ==
In English, the conditional perfect is formed using would have together with the past participle of the main verb. The auxiliary would marks the conditional mood (it is occasionally replaced by should in the first person; see shall and will), while the auxiliary have (used in combination with the past participle) marks the perfect aspect (prior occurrence of the event in question). The conditional perfect is used chiefly in the main clause (apodosis) of "third conditional" (or sometimes "mixed conditional") sentences, as described under English conditional sentences. Examples:

- You would have got[ten] more money if you had worked harder.
- If we had run faster, we would have arrived earlier.
- If I were a woman, I would have entered the contest.

It is also possible for the auxiliary would to be replaced by the modals should, could or might to express appropriate modality in addition to conditionality.

Sometimes, in (chiefly American English) informal speech, the would have construction appears in the if-clause as well ("If we would have run faster, we would have arrived earlier"), but this is considered incorrect in formal speech and writing (see English conditional sentences § Use of will and would in condition clauses).

English also has a conditional perfect progressive (would have been writing). For more details on the usage of this and of the ordinary conditional perfect, see the relevant sections of the article Uses of English verb forms.

== Other languages ==
French expresses past counterfactual conditional sentences in exactly the same way as English does: the if clause uses the had + past participle (pluperfect) form, while the then clause uses the would have + past participle form, where the equivalent of would have is the conditional of the auxiliary (avoir or être) used in all perfect constructions for the verb in question. Example:

- Si on l'avait su [pluperfect indicative], on aurait pu [conditional perfect] l'empêcher.

"If we had known it [pluperfect subjunctive], we would have been able [conditional perfect] to prevent it."

Spanish forms the conditional perfect on similar principles, e.g. yo te habría dicho todo ("I would have told you everything").

Dutch has a similar tense to the English one, formed with zou/zouden, the past tense of zullen, the auxiliary of the future tenses, e.g. ik zou je alles gezegd hebben ("I would have told you everything"). In Dutch grammar it is called the "perfect past future tense", emphasizing that it also has future-in-past properties.

Some eastern Finnic languages, such as Veps, Ludic and Livvi-Karelian, have come up with a conditional perfect suffix totally foreign to other Finnic languages. In Livvi-Karelian, for example, the conditional perfect suffix is -nuzi- (eg. andanuzin 'I would have given').

For certain other languages, see conditional mood.

== See also ==
- Conditional mood
- Conditional sentences
