= Dynamic modality =

Grammatical mood indicating ability

Dynamic modality is a linguistic modality that is the ability or requirement of the subject to do something. Dynamic modality is non-subjective in contrast to the similar deontic modality. In English, dynamic modality is expressed with "can" or "will."
