= Simple present =

Verb form

The simple present, present simple, or present indefinite is one of the verb forms associated with the present tense in modern English. It is commonly referred to as a tense, although it also encodes certain information about aspect in addition to the present time. The simple present is the most commonly used verb form in English, accounting for more than half of verbs in spoken English.

It is called "simple" because its basic form consists of a single word (like write or writes), in contrast with other present tense forms such as the present progressive (is writing) and present perfect (has written). For nearly all English verbs, the simple present is identical to the base form (dictionary form) of the verb, except when the subject is third-person singular, in which case the ending -(e)s is added. There are a few verbs with irregular forms, the most notable being the copula be, which has the simple present forms of am, is, and are.

== Conjugation ==
For pronouns I, you, we, they, there is no modification for verbs.

For pronouns he, she, it, a suffix is added following these rules:

For verbs that end in -o, -ch, -sh, -s, -x, or -z, the suffix -es is added.

Examples:

- Go – Goes
- Catch – Catches
- Wash – Washes
- Kiss – Kisses
- Fix – Fixes
- Buzz – Buzzes

For verbs that end in a consonant + y, the letter y is replaced by the suffix -ies.

Examples:

- Marry – Marries
- Study – Studies
- Carry – Carries
- Worry – Worries

In other cases, the suffix -s is added.

Examples:

- Play – Plays
- Enjoy – Enjoys
- Say – Says

A special situation happens with the verb to have in which the letters ve are omitted before adding s.

Example:

- Have – Has

== Formation ==
The basic form of the simple present is the same as the base form of the verb, unless the subject is third person singular, in which case a form with the addition of -(e)s is used. For details of how to make this inflected form, see English verbs § Third person singular present.

The copula verb be has irregular forms: am (first person singular), is (third person singular), and are (second person singular and all persons plural). The modal verbs (can, must, etc.) have only a single form, with no addition of -s for the third person singular.

The above refers to the indicative mood of the simple present; for the formation and use of the subjunctive mood, see English subjunctive. (The defective verb beware has no simple present indicative, although it can be used in the subjunctive.)

The conjugation of the simple present is given below, using the verb to write as an example.

Simple Present Indicative
	Singular	Plural
First Person	I write	We write
Second Person	You write	You write
Third Person	He/she/it writes	They write

=== Negative ===
The simple present for lexical verbs has an expanded form that uses do (or does, in the third person indicative) as an auxiliary verb. This is used particularly when forming questions and other clauses requiring inversion, negated clauses with not, and clauses requiring emphasis. For details see do-support. For the verbs (auxiliary and copular) that do not make this form, as well as the formation and use of contracted forms such as 's, isn't, and don't, see English auxiliaries and contractions.

Simple Present Negative
	Singular	Plural
First Person	I do not write	We do not write
Second Person	You do not write	You do not write
Third Person	He/she/it does not write	They do not write

== Uses ==
The simple present is used to refer to an action or event that takes place habitually, to remark habits, facts and general realities, repeated actions or unchanging situations, emotions, and wishes. Such uses are often accompanied by frequency adverbs and adverbial phrases such as always, sometimes, often, usually, from time to time, rarely, and never.

Examples:

- I always take a shower.
- I never go to the cinema.
- I walk to the pool.
- He writes for a living.
- She understands English.

This contrasts with the present progressive (present continuous), which is used to refer to something taking place at the present moment: I am walking now; He is writing a letter at the moment.

It is also used with stative verbs in senses that do not use progressive aspect (see Uses of English verb forms § Progressive), to refer to a present or general state, whether temporary, permanent or habitual:

- You are happy.
- I know what to do.
- A child needs its mother.
- I love you.

The simple present is also used to state facts:

- The Earth revolves around the Sun.
- A king beats a jack.
- Many Americans drink coffee in the morning.

It can similarly be used when quoting someone or something, even if the words were spoken in the past:

- Mary says she's ready.

It can be used to refer to a single completed action, as in recounting the events of a story in the present tense (see historical present), and in such contexts as newspaper headlines, where it replaces the present perfect:

- In Hamlet, Ophelia drowns in a stream.
- 40-year-old wins a gold medal.

Simple present is sometimes used to refer to an arranged future event, usually with a reference to time:

- We leave for Berlin tomorrow at 1 pm.
- Our holiday starts on 20 May.

It is used when providing a commentary on events as they occur:

- I chop the chives and add them to the mixture.
- Ronaldo dribbles around the defender and shoots.

Similarly, it is also used when describing events in some theoretical or planned situation that is under consideration:

- According to the manager's new idea, I welcome the guests and you give the presentation.

It is used in many dependent clauses referring to the future, particularly condition clauses, clauses expressing place and time, and many relative clauses (see Uses of English verb forms § Dependent clauses):

- If he finds your sweets, he will eat them.
- We will report as soon as we receive any information.

Simple present is also used in zero conditional sentences in both parts of the sentence.

- Ice melts if you heat it.
- Plants die if they don't get enough water.

In certain situations, like in a temporal adverbial clause, simple present is used rather than the present continuous:

- We can see the light improving as we speak.

In colloquial English, it is common to use can see, can hear for the present tense of see, hear, etc., and have got for the present tense of have (denoting possession). See Uses of English verb forms § Have got and can see.

== See also ==
- Present continuous
- Simple past
- Uses of English verb forms
