= Shall and will =

Discussion of modal verbs

Shall and will are two of the English modal verbs. They have various uses, including the expression of propositions about the future, in what is usually referred to as the future tense of English.

Historically, prescriptive grammar stated that, when expressing pure futurity (without any additional meaning such as desire or command), shall was to be used when the subject was in the first person, and will in other cases (e.g., "On Sunday, we shall go to church, and the preacher will read the Bible.") This rule is no longer commonly adhered to by any group of English speakers within the USA, and will has essentially replaced shall in nearly all contexts there. There are, however, many groups of speakers by region — and sometimes by class — within the UK, Ireland, Australia, and New Zealand who maintain this distinction, both in spoken and in written English.

For those regions that maintain the distinction — and often more broadly in formal English — the use of will for the first person and shall for the second person indicates use of the subjunctive or hortative moods.

Shall is, however, still widely used in bureaucratic documents, especially documents written by lawyers. Owing its use in varying legal contexts, its meaning can be ambiguous; the United States government's Plain Language group advises writers not to use the word at all. Other legal drafting experts, including Plain Language advocates, argue that while shall can be ambiguous in statutes (which most of the cited litigation on the word's interpretation involves), court rules, and consumer contracts, that reasoning does not apply to the language of business contracts. These experts recommend using shall but only to impose an obligation on a contractual party that is the subject of the sentence, i.e., to convey the meaning "hereby has a duty to".

== Etymology ==
The verb shall derives from Old English sceal. Its cognates in other Germanic languages include Old Norse skal, German soll, and Dutch zal; these all represent *skol-, the o-grade of Indo-European *skel-. All of these verbs function as auxiliaries, representing either simple futurity, or necessity or obligation.

The verb will derives from Old English willan, meaning to want or wish. Cognates include Old Norse vilja, German wollen (ich/er/sie will, meaning I/he/she want/s to), Dutch willen, Gothic wiljan. It also has relatives in non-Germanic languages, such as Latin velle ("wish for") and voluptas ("pleasure"), and Polish woleć ("prefer"). All of these forms derive from the e-grade or o-grade of Indo-European *wel-, meaning to wish for or desire. Within English, the modal verb will is also related to the noun will and the regular lexical verb will (as in "She willed him on").

Early Germanic did not inherit any Proto-Indo-European forms to express the future tense, and so the Germanic languages have innovated by using auxiliary verbs to express the future (this is evidenced in Gothic and in the earliest recorded Germanic expressions). In English, shall and will are the auxiliaries that came to be used for this purpose. (Another auxiliary used as such in Old English was mun, which is related to Scots maun, Modern English must and Dutch moet.)

== Derived forms and pronunciation ==
Both shall and will come from verbs that had the preterite-present conjugation in Old English (and generally in Germanic), meaning that they were conjugated using the strong preterite form (i.e., the usual past tense form) as the present tense. Because of this, like the other modal verbs, they do not take the usual -s in Modern English's third-person singular present; we say she shall and he will – not *she shalls, and not *he wills (except in the sense of "to will" being a synonym of "to want" or "to write into a will"). Archaically, there were, however, the variants shalt and wilt, which were used with thou.

Both verbs also have their own preterite (past) forms, namely should and would, which derive from the actual preterites of the Old English verbs (made using the dental suffix that forms the preterites of weak verbs). These forms have developed a range of meanings, frequently independent of those of shall and will (as described in the section on should and would below). Aside from this, though, shall and will (like the other modals) are defective verbs – they do not have other grammatical forms such as infinitives, imperatives or participles. (For instance, I want to will eat something or He's shalling go to sleep do not exist.)

Both shall and will may be contracted to -'ll, most commonly in affirmative statements where they follow a subject pronoun. Their negations, shall not and will not, also have contracted forms: shan't and won't (although shan't is rarely used in North America, and is becoming rarer elsewhere too).

The pronunciation of will is /wɪl/, and that of won't is /woʊnt/. However shall has distinct weak and strong pronunciations: /ʃəl/ when unstressed, and /ʃæl/ when stressed. Shan't is pronounced /ʃɑːnt/ in Australia, the United Kingdom, New Zealand, South Africa etc.; in North America (if used) it is pronounced /ʃænt/.

== Specific uses of shall or will ==
The modal verbs shall and will have been used in the past, and continue to be used, with a variety of meanings. Although when used purely as future markers they are largely interchangeable (as will be discussed in the following sections), each of the two verbs also has certain specific uses in which it cannot be replaced by the other without change of meaning.

The most common specific use of shall in everyday English is in questions that serve as offers or suggestions: "Shall I ...?" or "Shall we ...?" These are discussed under § Questions below.

In statements, shall has the specific use of expressing an order or instruction, normally in elevated or formal register. This use can blend with the usage of shall to express futurity, and is therefore discussed in detail below under § Colored uses.

Will (but not shall) is used to express habitual action, often (but not exclusively) action that the speaker finds annoying. This usage reflects the underlying and original volitive meaning of the verb.

- He will bite his nails, whatever I say.
- He will often stand on his head.

Similarly, will is used to express something that can be expected to happen in a general case, or something that is highly likely at the present time as follows. These uses may also, however, be understood as use of the simple future tense.

- A coat will last two years when properly cared for.
- That will be Mo at the door.

The other main specific implication of will is to express willingness, desire or intention. This blends with its usage in expressing futurity, and is discussed under § Colored uses. For its use in questions about the future, see § Questions.

== Uses of shall and will in expressing futurity ==
Both shall and will can be used to mark a circumstance as occurring in future time; this construction is often referred to as the future tense of English. For example:

- Will they be here tomorrow?
- I shall grow old some day.
- Shall we go for dinner?

When will or shall directly governs the infinitive of the main verb, as in the above examples, the construction is called the simple future tense. Future marking can also be combined with aspectual marking to produce constructions known as future progressive ("He will be working"), future perfect ("He will have worked") and future perfect progressive ("He will have been working"). English also has other ways of referring to future circumstances, including the going to construction, and in many cases the ordinary present tense – details of these can be found in the article on the going-to future.

The verbs will and shall, when used as future markers in informal speech, are largely interchangeable with regard to literal meaning. Generally, however, will is far more common than shall. Use of shall is normally a marked usage, typically indicating formality or seriousness and (if not used with a first person subject) expressing a colored meaning as described below. In many dialects of English, the use of shall as a future marker is now viewed as archaic or formal.

A rule of prescriptive grammar was created to remove these ambiguities. According to this rule, when expressing simple futurity, the auxiliary shall is to be used with first person subjects (I and we), and will is to be used in other instances. Using will with the first person or shall with the second or third person is asserted to indicate some additional meaning in addition to plain futurity, usually an indication of subjunctive or hortative use.

=== Prescriptivist distinction ===
According to Merriam Webster's Dictionary of English Usage, the distinction between shall and will as future markers arose from the practice of Latin teaching in English schools in the 14th century. It was customary to use will to translate the Latin velle (meaning to wish, want or intend); this left shall (which had no other equivalent in Latin) to translate the Latin future tense. This practice kept shall alive in the role of future marker; it is used consistently as such in the Middle English Wycliffe's Bible. However, in the common language it was will that was becoming predominant in that role. Chaucer normally uses will to indicate the future, regardless of grammatical person.

An influential proponent of the prescriptive rule that shall is to be used as the usual future marker in the first person was John Wallis. In Grammatica Linguae Anglicanae (1653) he wrote: "The rule is [...] to express a future event without emotional overtones, one should say I shall, we shall, but you/he/she/they will; conversely, for emphasis, willfulness, or insistence, one should say I/we will, but you/he/she/they shall".

Henry Watson Fowler wrote in his book The King's English (1906), regarding the rules for using shall vs. will, the comment "the idiomatic use, while it comes by nature to southern Englishmen ... is so complicated that those who are not to the manner born can hardly acquire it". The Pocket Fowler's Modern English Usage, OUP, 2002, says of the rule for the use of shall and will: "it is unlikely that this rule has ever had any consistent basis of authority in actual usage, and many examples of [British] English in print disregard it".

Nonetheless, even among speakers (the majority in the US) who do not follow the rule about using shall as the unmarked form in the first person, there is still a tendency to use shall and will to express different shades of meaning (reflecting aspects of their original Old English senses). Thus shall is used with the meaning of obligation, and will with the meaning of desire or intention.

An illustration of the contrast between shall and will (when the prescriptive rule is adhered to) appeared in the 19th century, and has been repeated in the 20th century and in the 21st:

- I shall drown; no one will save me! (expresses the expectation of drowning, simple expression of future occurrence)
- I will drown; no one shall save me! (expresses suicidal intent: first-person will for desire, third-person shall for command)

An example of this distinction in writing occurs in Henry James's 1893 short story The Middle Years:

"Don't you know?—I want to what they call 'live.'"
The young man, for good-by, had taken his hand, which closed with a certain force. They looked at each other hard a moment. "You will live," said Dr. Hugh.
"Don't be superficial. It's too serious!"
"You shall live!" Dencombe's visitor declared, turning pale.
"Ah, that's better!" And as he retired the invalid, with a troubled laugh, sank gratefully back.

A more popular illustration of the use of "shall" with the second person to express determination occurs in the oft-quoted words the fairy godmother traditionally says to Cinderella in British versions of the well-known fairy tale: "You shall go to the ball, Cinderella!"

Another popular illustration is in the dramatic scene from The Lord of the Rings: The Fellowship of the Ring when Gandalf checks the Balrog's advance with magisterial censure, "You shall not pass!"

The use of shall as the usual future marker in the first person nevertheless persists in some more formal or elevated registers of English. An example is provided by the famous speech of Winston Churchill: "We shall fight on the beaches, we shall fight on the landing grounds, we shall fight in the fields and in the streets, we shall fight in the hills; we shall never surrender.'"

=== Colored uses ===
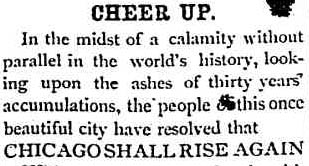
Example of shall in the lead editorial of the Chicago Tribune after the Chicago Fire, using "shall" to connote formality and seriousness.

Whether or not the above-mentioned prescriptive rule (shall for the unmarked future in the first person) is adhered to, there are certain meanings in which either will or shall tends to be used rather than the other. Some of these have already been mentioned (see the Specific uses section). However, there are also cases in which the meaning being expressed combines plain futurity with some additional implication; these can be referred to as "colored" uses of the future markers.

Thus shall may be used (particularly in the second and third persons) to imply a command, promise or threat made by the speaker (i.e., that the future event denoted represents the will of the speaker rather than that of the subject). For example:

- You shall regret it before long. (speaker's threat)
- You shall not pass! (speaker's command)
- You shall go to the ball. (speaker's promise)

In the above sentences, shall might be replaced by will without change of intended meaning, although the form with will could also be interpreted as a plain statement about the expected future. The use of shall is often associated with formality and/or seriousness, in addition to the coloring of the meaning. For some specific cases of its formal use, see the sections below on § Legal use and § Technical specifications.

(Another, generally archaic, use of shall is in certain dependent clauses with future reference, as in "The prize is to be given to whoever shall have done the best." This is an example of the subjunctive, formerly required in such a sentence. Here in modern English is the simple present tense: "whoever does the best"; see Uses of English verb forms § Dependent clauses.)

On the other hand, will can be used (in the first person) to emphasize the willingness, desire or intention of the speaker:

- I will lend you £10,000 at 5% (the speaker is willing to make the loan, but it will not necessarily be made)
- I will have my way.

Most speakers have will as the future marker in any case, but when the meaning is as above, even those who follow or are influenced by the prescriptive rule would tend to use will (rather than the shall that they would use with a first person subject for the uncolored future).

The division of uses of will and shall is somewhat different in questions than in statements; see the following section for details.

== Questions ==
In questions, the traditional prescriptive usage is that the auxiliary used should be the one expected in the answer. Hence in inquiring factually about the future, one could ask: "Shall you accompany me?" (to accord with the expected answer "I shall", since the rule prescribes shall as the uncolored future marker in the first person). To use will instead would turn the question into a request. In practice, however, shall is almost never used in questions of this type. To mark a factual question as distinct from a request, the going-to future (or just the present tense) can be used: "Are you going to accompany me?" (or "Are you accompanying me?").

The chief use of shall in questions is with a first person subject (I or we), to make offers and suggestions, or request suggestions or instructions:

- Shall I open a window?
- Shall we dance?
- Where shall we go today?
- What shall I do next?

This is common in the UK and other parts of the English-speaking world; it is also found in the United States, but there should is often a less marked alternative. Normally the use of will in such questions would change the meaning to a simple request for information: "Shall I play goalkeeper?" is an offer or suggestion, while "Will I play goalkeeper?" is just a question about the expected future situation.

The above meaning of shall is generally confined to direct questions with a first person subject. In the case of a reported question (even if not reported in the past tense), shall is likely to be replaced by should or another modal verb such as might: "She is asking if she should open a window"; "He asked if they might dance."

The auxiliary will can therefore be used in questions either simply to enquire about what is expected to occur in the future, or (especially with the second person subject you) to make a request:

- Where will tomorrow's match be played? (factual enquiry)
- Will the new director do a good job? (enquiry for opinion)
- Will I put on the radio? (enquiry for confirmation to act)
- Will you marry me? (request)

== Legal and technical use ==
=== US legal system ===
Bryan Garner and Justice Scalia in Reading Law: The Interpretation of Legal Texts describe that some legal drafting has sloppy use of the word "shall". Nevertheless, Garner and Scalia conclude that when the word "shall" can reasonably be understood as mandatory, it ought to be taken that way. In 2007, the U.S. Supreme Court said ("The word 'shall' generally indicates a command that admits of no discretion on the part of the person instructed to carry out the directive"); Black's Law Dictionary 1375 (6th ed. 1990) ("As used in statutes ... this word is generally imperative or mandatory").

Legislative acts and contracts sometimes use "shall" and "shall not" to express mandatory action and prohibition. However, it is sometimes used to mean "may" or "can". The most famous example of both of these uses of the word "shall" is the United States Constitution. Claims that "shall" is used to denote a fact, or is not used with the above different meanings, have caused discussions and have significant consequences for interpreting the text's intended meaning. Lawsuits over the word's meaning are also common.

=== Canadian statutes ===
Canada's Interpretation Act, which applies to the interpretation of all federal statutes and regulations, provides that "shall" is to be construed as imperative. Similar law applies in at least some provinces.

=== Technical contexts ===
In many requirement specifications, particularly involving software, the words shall and will have special meanings. Most requirement specifications use the word shall to denote something that is required, while reserving the will for simple statement about the future (especially since "going to" is typically seen as too informal for legal contexts). However, some documents deviate from this convention and use the words shall, will, and should to denote the strength of the requirement. Some requirement specifications will define the terms at the beginning of the document.

Shall and will are distinguished by NASA as follows:

- Shall is usually used to state a device or system's requirements. For example: "The selected generator shall provide a minimum of 80 Kilowatts."
- Will is generally used to state a device or system's purpose. For example, "The new generator will be used to power the operations tent."

On standards published by International Organization for Standardization (ISO), IEC (International Electrotechnical Commission), ASTM (American Society for Testing and Materials), IEEE (Institute of Electrical and Electronics Engineers), requirements with "shall" are the mandatory requirements, meaning, "must", or "have to". The IETF (Internet Engineering Task Force) defines shall and must as synonymous terms denoting absolute requirements, and should as denoting a somewhat flexible requirement, in RFC documents.

On specifications and standards published by the United States Department of Defense (DoD), requirements with "shall" are the mandatory requirements. ("Must" shall not be used to express mandatory provisions. Use the term "shall".) "Will" declares intent or simple futurity, and "should" and "may" express nonmandatory provisions.

Outside DoD, other parts of the U.S. government advise against using the word shall for three reasons: it lacks a single clear meaning, it causes litigation, and it is nearly absent from ordinary speech. The legal reference Words and Phrases dedicates 76 pages to summarizing hundreds of lawsuits that centered around the meaning of the word shall. When referencing a legal or technical requirement, Words and Phrases instead favors must while reserving should for recommendations.

== Should and would ==
As noted above, should and would originated as the preterite (past tense) forms of shall and will. In some of their uses they can still be identified as past (or conditional) forms of those verbs, but they have also developed some specific meanings of their own.

=== Independent uses ===
The main use of should in modern English is as a synonym of ought to, expressing quasi-obligation, appropriateness, or expectation (it cannot be replaced by would in these meanings). Examples:

- You should not say such things. (it is wrong to do so)
- He should move his pawn. (it is optimal to do so)
- Why should you suspect me? (for what reason is it proper to suspect me?)
- You should have enough time to finish the work. (a prediction)
- I should be able to come. (a prediction, implies some uncertainty)
- There should be some cheese in the kitchen. (expectation)

Other specific uses of should involve the expression of irrealis mood:

- in condition clauses (protasis), e.g., "If it should rain" or "Should it rain"; see English conditional sentences
- as an alternative to the subjunctive, e.g., "It is important that he (should) leave"; see English subjunctive

The main use of would is in conditional clauses (described in detail in the article on English conditional sentences):

- I would not be here if you hadn't summoned me.

In this use, would is sometimes (though rarely) replaced by should when the subject is in the first person (by virtue of the same prescriptive rule that demands shall rather than will as the normal future marker for that person). This should is found in stock phrases such as "I should think" and "I should expect". However its use in more general cases is old-fashioned or highly formal, and can give rise to ambiguity with the more common use of should to mean ought to. This is illustrated by the following sentences:

- You would apologize if you saw him. (pure conditional, stating what would happen)
- You should apologize if you see him. (states what would be proper)
- I would apologize if I saw him. (pure conditional)
- I should apologize if I saw him. (possibly a formal variant of the above, but may be understood to be stating what is proper)

In archaic usage would has been used to indicate present time desire. "Would that I were dead" means "I wish I were dead". "I would fain" means "I would gladly".

More details of the usage of should, would and other related auxiliaries can be found in the article on English modal verbs.

=== As past of shall and will ===
When would and should function as past tenses of will and shall, their usage tends to correspond to that of the latter verbs (would is used analogously to will, and should to shall).

Thus would and should can be used with "future-in-the-past" meaning, to express what was expected to happen, or what in fact did happen, after some past time of reference. The use of should here (like that of shall as a plain future marker) is much less common and is generally confined to the first person. Examples:

- He left Bath in 1890, and would never return. (in fact he never returned after that)
- It seemed that it would rain. (rain was expected)
- Little did I know that I would (rarer: should) see her again the very next day.

Would can also be used as the past equivalent of will in its other specific uses, such as in expressing habitual actions (see English markers of habitual aspect#Would):

- Last summer we would go fishing a lot. (i.e., we used to go fishing a lot)

In particular, would and should are used as the past equivalents of will and shall in indirect speech reported in the past tense:

- The ladder will fall. → He said that the ladder would fall.
- You shall obey me! → He said that I should obey him.
- I shall go swimming this afternoon. → I said that I should go swimming in the afternoon.

As with the conditional use referred to above, the use of should in such instances can lead to ambiguity; in the last example it is not clear whether the original statement was shall (expressing plain future) or should (meaning "ought to"). Similarly "The archbishop said that we should all sin from time to time" is intended to report the pronouncement that "We shall all sin from time to time" (where shall denotes simple futurity), but instead gives the highly misleading impression that the original word was should (meaning "ought to").

== See also ==
- English verbs
- Grammatical person
