= Prospective aspect =

Grammatical aspect of relative future

In linguistics, the prospective aspect (abbreviated PROSP or PRSP) is a grammatical aspect describing an event that occurs subsequent to a given reference time. One way to view tenses in English and many other languages is as a combination of a reference time (past, present, or future) in which a situation takes place, and the time of a particular event relative to the reference time (before, at, or after). As an example, consider the following sentence:

- When I got home yesterday, John called and said he would arrive soon.

The verb would arrive expresses a combination of past reference time (the situation of my getting home, established as being in the past by the introductory clause) and an event (John's arrival) whose time of occurrence is subsequent to the reference time. Technically, this verb is said to be past tense, prospective aspect, with the tense expressing the time of the overall situation and the aspect expressing how the event itself is viewed, relative to the vantage point of the overall situation.

In English, the prospective aspect is most clearly distinguished in the past. The English future tense expressed by the auxiliary verb will refers to an event in the absolute future, regardless of the reference time or relative time of the event:

- Whenever I get home, John usually calls and says he will arrive soon (present reference, prospective event).
- When I get home tomorrow, John will arrive and meet me (future reference, simultaneous event).
- When I get home tomorrow, John will probably call and say he will arrive soon (future reference, prospective event).
- When I got home yesterday, John called and said he will arrive in three weeks (past reference, prospective event in the absolute future).

Note in particular the last sentence, with the same combination of tense and aspect as would arrive in the first sentence above, but with an emphasis on a time occurring in the absolute future (i.e. after the present time, rather than simply after the time of the situation being described).

However, in English it is possible to express the prospective aspect in tenses other than the past using the so-called going-to future: "He says he's going to finish soon. But yesterday he was also going to finish soon, and I'm sure in five weeks he'll still be going to finish soon."

The opposite of the prospective aspect is the retrospective aspect, more commonly known as the "perfect":

- When I got home yesterday, John had already arrived (past reference, retrospective event, also known as past perfect or pluperfect).

It is actually possible to combine prospective and retrospective (perfect) aspects to produce a "prospective perfect", especially in the past:

- Don't wait a week; John will have already left (future reference, perfect aspect or present reference, prospective perfect aspect).
- I told him not to wait a week; John would have already left (unambiguously past reference, prospective perfect aspect).
- I was going to have left by then, but got distracted (past reference, prospective perfect aspect).

== See also ==
- Future in the past
