= English modal auxiliary verbs =

Class of auxiliary verbs in English that lack untensed forms

The English modal auxiliary verbs are a subset of the English auxiliary verbs used mostly to express modality, properties such as possibility and obligation. (Note: Although there are non-auxiliary modal verbs in English, such as "require" and "oblige", the aim of brevity causes this article often to use "modal" or "modal verb" to mean "modal auxiliary verb".) They can most easily be distinguished from other verbs by their defectiveness (they do not have participles or plain forms (Note: The plain form of a verb is exemplified by beware and the form be of the verb be: You should beware of the dog; You should be careful. It is distinguished from the plain present form of the verb, as exemplified by am, are, and were. For any verb other than be that is not defective, the plain and plain present forms are identical in pronunciation and spelling.)) and by their lack of the ending ‑(e)s for the third-person singular.

The central English modal auxiliary verbs are can (with could), may (with might), shall (with should), will (with would), and must. A few other verbs are usually also classed as modals: ought, and (in certain uses) dare, and need. Use (/jus/, rhyming with "goose") is included as well. Other expressions, notably had better, share some of their characteristics.

== Modal auxiliary verbs distinguished grammatically ==
A list of what tend to be regarded as modal auxiliary verbs in Modern English, along with their inflected forms, is shown in the following table.

Contractions are shown only if their orthography is distinctive. There are also unstressed versions that are typically, although not necessarily, written in the standard way. Where there is a blank, the modal auxiliary verb lacks this form. (A corresponding lexical verb may have the form. For example, although the lexical verb need has a preterite form, the modal auxiliary verb need does not.)

English modal auxiliary verb paradigm
Citation form	Plain present			Preterite			Confusible lexical homonym? (Note: More precisely: Does there exist a lexical verb with the same spelling and pronunciation that is synonymous or could be said to have an auxiliary (or copular) function? (Ignored here is any lexical verb that is unlikely to be mistaken for the auxiliary verb: will meaning "exert one's will in an attempt to compel", may meaning "celebrate May Day", can meaning "insert into cans", must meaning "become musty", etc.))
Citation form	Neutral	Contr.	Negative	Neutral	Contr.	Negative	Confusible lexical homonym?
will	will	'll	won't	would	'd	wouldn't	none
may (Note: "[T]here is evidence that for some speakers [of Standard English] may and might have diverged to the extent that they are no longer inflectional forms of a single lexeme, but belong to distinct lexemes, may and might, each of which – like must – lacks a preterite. . . .")	may			might		mightn't	none
can	can		can't, cannot	could		couldn't	none
shall	shall	'll	shan't	should		shouldn't	none
must	must		mustn't				none
ought	ought		oughtn't				marginal ('art' in some varieties)
do	do		don't	did		didn't	exists
need (Note: An NPI, rare for speakers of Standard American English.)	need		needn't				exists
dare	dare		daren't	dared		daredn't	exists
had better				had better	'd better, ∅ better	hadn't better, 'd better not, ∅ better not	none
used (Note: Pronounced /just/ (rhyming with "roost"). Auxiliary verb form used should be distinguished from the homonymous adjective used, as in I've got (very) used to it. (The homographic verb form used /juzd/, rhyming with "refused", is lexical only.) "For many speakers [of Standard English], especially younger ones", use /jus/ is exclusively a lexical verb.)				used		usedn't	exists

=== Criteria for modal auxiliary verbs ===
Descriptive grammars of English differ slightly on the criteria they set for modal auxiliary verbs. According to The Cambridge Grammar of the English Language, the criteria are as follows.

==== Auxiliary verbs ====
Modal auxiliary verbs are a subset of auxiliary verbs and thus meet the criteria for these. For lists of those criteria, see the article English auxiliary verbs, but among them are that the verbs (i) can invert with their subjects (notably in questions, Must I go?), (ii) can be negated with not (I must not go; Must I not go?), and (iii) have negative inflected forms (won't, wouldn't).

==== No untensed forms ====
To illustrate untensed forms, those of the irregular lexical verb take and the non-modal auxiliary verb be are the plain take and be (as in Take it!, I didn't take it, and Don't be silly), the gerund-participles taking and being, and the past participles taken and been.

Modal auxiliary verbs lack untensed forms. Attempting to use them brings ungrammatical results:

- *I will can drive if I take ten lessons. (Note: This article uses asterisks ⟨*⟩ to indicate ungrammatical expressions. As an example, "She can/*cans try" means that although She can try is grammatical, *She cans try is not.)
- *Canning drive would be helpful.
- *I have could/canned drive since I was 18.

Compare the grammaticality of non-modal auxiliary verb be in I will be able to drive, being able to drive, and I have been able to drive.

==== No subject–verb agreement ====
This refers to agreement of a verb (in present tense) with its third-person singular subject:

- She can/*cans try.

Compare lexical verb try in She tries/*try, and non-modal auxiliary verb do in She does/*do try.

Had better and (as an auxiliary verb) used lack present tense forms. Other than in the present tense, even lexical verbs lack subject agreement and so this test is inapplicable to either had better or used.

==== Only a bare infinitival clause as complement ====
Whereas the lexical verb seem takes a to-infinitival clause (It seemed to happen), and the non-modal auxiliary verb have takes a past participial clause complement (It has happened), a modal auxiliary verb can, in principle, take only a bare infinitival clause (a subordinate clause with the plain form of the verb without to) as its complement:

- It can be a surprise.
- *It can to be a surprise.
- *It can being a surprise.

If they are modal auxiliary verbs, then ought and used are exceptions to this (although ought is increasingly used with a bare infinitival clause complement).

Bare infinitival clause complements are not unique to modal auxiliary verbs. Do is a non-modal auxiliary verb that takes one (Did you move the piano?); help is a lexical verb that can do so (I helped move the piano).

==== Ability to occur in remote apodosis ====
An apodosis is the "then" half of a conditional statement. (The "if" half is the protasis.) Remote here means "thought by the speaker to be unlikely" or "known by the speaker to be untrue".

- If I were an elephant, I would eat more apples.

Compare lexical verb eat in *If I were an elephant, I ate more apples, and non-modal auxiliary verb be in *If I were an elephant, I was able to eat more apples.

Must satisfies this only for a minority of speakers, and it is questionable whether had better does so.

The Cambridge Grammar comments on may that:

here there is evidence that for some speakers may and might have diverged to the extent that they are no longer inflectional forms of a single lexeme, but belong to distinct lexemes, may and might, each of which – like must – lacks a preterite....

Used does not satisfy this.

==== Preterite usable in the main clause for modal remoteness ====
- I could drive there, I suppose.

If similarly intended (as a doubtful or incredulous contemplation of an option for the future), attempts at this with a lexical or non-modal auxiliary verb are ungrammatical: *I drove there, I suppose; *I was going to drive there, I suppose.

Other than when used for backshift, should has diverged in meaning so far from shall as to be usable here only with difficulty. As they lack preterite forms, must, ought and need cannot be used in this way, and so that criterion does not apply to them. And used describes the past, not the present or future.

==== Comments ====
The following verbs, shown in present–preterite pairs, satisfy or come close to satisfying all of the above criteria and can be classed as the central modal verbs of English:

- can (with could)
- will (with would)
- may (with might) – although the lack in today's Standard English of a negative present inflection (*mayn't) means that it fails one of the criteria for auxiliary verbs
- shall (with should) – although the semantic divergence of shall and should means that its success with one criterion is debatable
- must – although its lack of a preterite (see its etymology below) means that it neither passes nor fails one of the criteria

Even for lexical verbs, preterite forms have uses besides referring to the past, but for modal auxiliary verbs, such uses are particularly important: (Could you pass me the sauce?; Without my phone I might easily be lost; You should work harder; I would avoid that street).

Ought, dare, need, and used satisfy some of the criteria above, and are more (ought, dare, need) or less (used) often categorized as modal verbs. Had better is sometimes called a modal idiom.

Other English auxiliary verbs appear in a variety of different forms and are not regarded as modal verbs:

- be, used as an auxiliary verb in passive voice, continuous aspect and indeed in virtually all of its uses, even as a copula;
- have, used as an auxiliary verb in perfect aspect constructions and the idiom have got (to); it is also used in have to, which has modal meaning, but here (as when denoting possession (very broadly understood)) have only rarely follows auxiliary verb syntax;
- do, see do-support;
- to, of to-infinitival clauses (if to is a defective verb, not a subordinator).

=== Lists of modal auxiliary verbs ===
Five recent scholarly descriptions of verbs disagree among themselves on the extension of modal auxiliary verb: on which verbs are modal auxiliary verbs.

They agree that can (with could), may (with might), must, shall (with should) and will (with would) are, or are among, the "central modal auxiliaries" (A Comprehensive Grammar of the English Language, 1985), "secondary or modal auxiliaries" (F. R. Palmer, 1988), "modal auxiliaries" (Anthony R. Warner, 1993), "central members of the modal auxiliary class" (The Cambridge Grammar of the English Language, 2002), or "core modal verbs" (Bas Aarts, 2014).

Among these five verbs, The Cambridge Grammar selects the pair can and will (with could and would) as "the most straightforward of the modal auxiliaries". Peter Collins agrees.

All five accord ought, need and dare a less clear or merely a marginal membership.

A Comprehensive Grammar and Warner do likewise for use; the other three deny that it is a modal auxiliary verb or note the disagreement. For that reason, it is discussed primarily not in this article but in English auxiliary verbs.

As for would in would rather, would sooner and would as soon, and have in had better, had best and had rather, only The Cambridge Grammar notes all six, but each of the other four descriptions of auxiliary verbs notes three or more. Of the three to six idioms that each discussion notes, there is no variation in the status that it accords to them. Warner calls the three that he notes (would rather, had better, had rather) modal auxiliaries. Palmer says that the same three are not modal auxiliaries. Both A Comprehensive Grammar and Aarts use the term modal idiom for a choice of five. The Cambridge Grammar sees modal characteristics in all six uses of these two auxiliary verbs.

A Comprehensive Grammar calls both have got (I've got to go now) and be to (You are to hand over the cash) modal idioms. None of the other descriptions agree.

Palmer calls be bound/able/going/willing to and have (got) to semi-modals. A Comprehensive Grammar calls be able/about/apt/bound/due/going/likely/meant/obliged/supposed/willing to and have to semi-auxiliaries. He adds, "The boundaries of this category are not clear".

== Etymology ==
The modals can and could are from Old English can(n) and cuþ, which were respectively the present and preterite forms of the verb cunnan ("be able"). The silent l in the spelling of could results from analogy with would and should.

Similarly, may and might are from Old English mæg and meahte, respectively the present and preterite forms of magan ("may, to be able"); shall and should are from sceal and sceolde, respectively the present and preterite forms of sculan ("owe, be obliged"); and will and would are from wille and wolde, respectively the present and preterite forms of willan ("wish, want").

The aforementioned Old English verbs cunnan, magan, sculan, and willan followed the preterite-present paradigm (or, in the case of willan, a similar but irregular paradigm), which explains the absence of the ending -s in the third-person present forms can, may, shall, and will. (The original Old English forms given above were first- and third-person singular forms; their descendant forms have become generalized to all persons and numbers.)

The verb must comes from Old English moste, part of the verb motan ("be able/obliged (to do something)"). This was another preterite-present verb, of which moste was in fact the preterite (the present form mot gave rise to mote, which was used as a modal verb in Early Modern English, but must has now lost its past connotations and has replaced mote). Similarly, ought was originally a past form—it derives from ahte, preterite of agan ("own"), another Old English preterite-present verb whose present tense form, ah, has also given the modern (regular) verb owe, and ought was formerly used as a preterite form of owe.

The verb dare also originates from a preterite-present verb, durran ("dare"), specifically its present tense dear(r) although in its non-modal uses in Modern English, it is conjugated regularly. However, need comes from the regular Old English verb neodian (meaning "be necessary")—the alternative third person form need (in place of needs), which has become the norm in modal uses, became common in the 16th century.

== Preterite forms ==
The preterite forms given above (could, might, should, and would, corresponding to can, may, shall, and will, respectively) do not always simply modify the meaning of the modal to give it past reference. The only one regularly used as an ordinary past tense is could when referring to ability: I could swim may serve as a past form of I can swim.

This "future-in-the-past" (also known as the past prospective) use of would can also occur in a main clause: I moved to Green Gables in 1930; I would live there for the next ten years.

In many cases, in order to give modals past reference, they are used together with the auxiliary have and a past participle, as in I should have asked her; You may have seen me. Sometimes these expressions are limited in meaning; for example, must have can refer only to certainty, whereas past obligation is expressed by an alternative phrase such as had to (see § Replacements for defective forms below).

=== Indirect speech ===
All the preterite forms are used as past equivalents of the corresponding present-tense modal verbs in indirect speech and similar clauses requiring the rules of sequence of tenses to be applied. For example, if it were said in 1960 that People think that we will all be driving hovercars by the year 2000, it might now be reported that In 1960, people thought that we would all be driving hovercars by the year 2000.

English modal verbs in direct and indirect speech
Modal verb	Direct speech	Indirect speech
Can	He said, "Nobody can say a word."	He said that nobody could say a word.
Could	He said, "Nobody could say a word."	He said that nobody could say a word.
May	He said, "Nobody may say a word."	He said that nobody might say a word.
Might	He said, "Nobody might say a word."	He said that nobody might say a word.
Must	He said, "Nobody must say a word."	He said that nobody must/had to say a word.
Shall	He said, "Nobody shall say a word."	He said that nobody should/would say a word.
Should	He said, "Nobody should say a word."	He said that nobody should say a word.
Will	He said, "Nobody will say a word."	He said that nobody would say a word.
Would	He said, "Nobody would say a word."	He said that nobody would say a word.
Dare	He said, "Nobody dare say a word."	He said that nobody dared (to) say a word.
Need	He said, "Nobody need say a word."	He said that nobody needed to say a word.
Ought	He said, "Nobody ought to say a word."	He said that nobody ought to say a word.
Used	He said, "Nobody used to say a word."	He said that nobody used to say a word.

=== Conditional sentences ===
The preterite forms of modals are used in the apodosis (then-clause) of counterfactual conditional sentences. The modal would (or should as a first-person alternative) is used to produce the conditional construction typically used in clauses of this type: If you loved me, you would support me. It can be replaced by could (meaning "would be able (to do something)") and might (meaning "would possibly") as appropriate.

When the clause has past reference, the construction with the modal plus have (see above) is used: If they (had) wanted to do it, they would (could/might) have done it by now. (The would have done construction is called the conditional perfect.)

The protasis (if-clause) of such a sentence typically contains the preterite form of a verb (or the past perfect construction, for past reference), without any modal. The modal could may be used here in its role of the preterite form of can (if I could speak French). However, all the modal preterites can be used in such clauses with certain types of hypothetical future reference: if I should lose or should I lose (equivalent to if I lose); if you would/might/could stop doing that (usually used as a form of request).

Sentences with the verb wish and expressions of wish using if only... follow similar patterns to the if-clauses that are referred to above when they have counterfactual present or past reference. When they express a desired event in the near future, the modal would is used: I wish you would visit me; If only he would give me a sign.

For more information see English conditional sentences.

== Second-person singular forms ==
Early Modern English often distinguished between second-person plural you (or ye) and second-person singular thou. Rather as English verbs other than modal auxiliaries agree with third-person singular subjects in today's English, Early Modern English verbs in general (modal auxiliaries included) agreed with a second-person subject that was distinctively singular. (There was no such agreement with instances of you or ye that happened to have singular reference.) Examples from Shakespeare are shown below, except for motest, attested in John Dee.

Second-person singular (thou) forms
	Plain present	Preterite
can	canst (Note: Thou canst not then be false to any man. (Hamlet, I.3))	couldst (Note: Couldst thou save nothing? (King Lear, III.4))
dare	darest (Note: Arrest me, foolish fellow, if thou darest. (Comedy of Errors, IV.1))	durst (Note: Durst thou have look'd upon him being awake, / And hast thou kill'd him sleeping? (Midsummer Night's Dream, III.2))
may	mayst, mayest (Note: Safe mayst thou wander, safe return again! (Cymbeline, III.5); If thou mayest discern by that which is left of him what he is, fetch me to the sight of him. (Winter's Tale, III.3))	mightst (Note: Then mightst thou speak, then mightst thou tear thy hair (Romeo and Juliet, III.3))
must	must, motest (Note: thou must know the king is full of grief (Winter's Tale, IV.4); and well motest thou fare, my Christian brother, and sincerely beloved countryman (General and Rare Memorials, Pref.))	
need	needest (Note: thy horse stands behind the hedge: when thou needest him, there thou shalt find him (Henry IV, Part 1, II.2))	
ought	oughtest (Note: thou oughtest not to let thy horse wear a cloak (Henry VI, Part 2, IV.7))	
shall	shalt	shouldst (Note: Wherefore shouldst thou pity her? (Two Gentlemen of Verona, IV.4))
will	wilt (Note: Wilt thou be lord of all the world? (Antony and Cleopatra, II.7))	wouldst (Note: Why, whither, Adam, wouldst thou have me go? (As You Like It, II.3))

== Replacements for defective forms ==
As noted above, English modal verbs are defective in that they do not have any untensed form, or, for some, preterite form. However, in many cases, expressions can carry the same meaning as the modal and be used to supply the missing forms:

- The modals can and could, expressing ability, can be replaced by be able to, with the appropriate inflection of be.
- The modals may and might, expressing permission, can be replaced by be allowed to, again with the appropriate inflection of be.
- The modal must in most meanings can be replaced by have to, with the appropriate inflection of have.
- When used for futurity, will and shall can be replaced by be going to, with the appropriate inflection of be.
- The modals should and ought to might be replaced by be supposed to, again with the appropriate inflection of be.

It needs to be noted, however, that there are often subtle differences of meaning between the modals and their alternative constructions. Compare:

I must go into town. (arising from feeling compelled, urgency)

I have to go into town. (obliged to by another or circumstances)

== Weak forms ==
The modals have strong and weak forms:

- can /ˈkæn/ → /kən/
- could /ˈkʊd/ → /kəd/
- shall /ˈʃæl/ → /ʃəl/
- should /ˈʃʊd/ → /ʃəd/
- will /ˈwɪl/ → /wəl/, /l/
- would /ˈwʊd/ → /wəd/, /d/
- had better /ˈhæd ˈbɛtəɹ/ → /həd ˈbɛtəɹ/, /d ˈbɛtəɹ/, /ˈbɛtəɹ/

When shall and should are first-person replacements for will and would, they too may take the weak forms ‑ll and ‑d.

A combination like should have is normally reduced to /ʃʊd(h)əv/ or just /ʃʊdə/ shoulda. Also, ought to can become /ɔːtə/ oughta. See weak and strong forms in English.

Most of the modals have negative inflected forms: can't, won't, etc. Although they began as weak forms (contractions), they since evolved into inflections.

== Effect of negation ==
Either or both of two kinds of negation can apply to a construction using a modal auxiliary verb. Internal negation semantically applies to the complement of the modal. The difference between He might have overheard you and He might not have overheard you (with internal negation) is that between "It is possible that he overheard you" and "It is possible that he did not overhear you". With internal negation, not may occur closer to the main verb. He might have not overheard you has the same meaning as He might not have overheard you. He could have not overheard you means "It is possible that he did not overhear you".

In contrast, external negation applies to the modal itself. The difference between He could have overheard you and He couldn't have overheard you (with external negation) is that between "It is possible that he overheard you" and "It is not possible that he overheard you".

Comparing You mustn't apologize and You needn't apologize, the former involves internal negation, converting the necessity from apology-making to standing your ground; the latter external negation, negating any necessity.

The two kinds of negation can be combined. He can't have not overheard you means "It is not possible that he did not overhear you".

Whether negation is internal or external depends in part on the particular verb and the strength of modality it expresses. However: "Negative interrogatives, used as questions biased towards a positive answer, have external negation irrespective of the strength of the modality [. . .] A special case is in tags: We must stop soon, mustn't we?"

== Usage of specific verbs ==
=== Can and could ===
The modal verb can expresses possibility in a dynamic, deontic, or epistemic sense, that is, in terms of innate ability, permissibility, or probability. For example:

- Dynamic
  - Ability: You needn't struggle with your Tamil when talking to me: I can speak English ("I am capable of speaking English"; "I know how to speak English")
  - Existential: Most siblings get along at least tolerably well, but there can be strong rivalry between them (such rivalry does sometimes occur)
  - The reasonable/acceptable: You can be a few minutes late; nobody will mind
  - The circumstantially possible: Petrol left for months in an unused car can wreck its fuel line (This is the result of a predictable chemical process that is not being prevented.)
- Deontic: Smoking is forbidden anywhere in this building, but you can smoke behind the bicycle shed ("You are permitted to smoke here")
- Epistemic: He did the "Ironman" in under seven hours? That can't be true. ("It is impossible for that to be true.")

The preterite form could is used as the past tense or remote conditional form of can in the above meanings (see § Preterite forms above). It is also used to express likelihood: We could be in trouble here. It is preferable to use could, may or might rather than can when expressing likelihood in a particular situation (as opposed to the general case, as in the "rivalry" example above, where can or may is used).

Both can and could can be used to make requests: Can/could you pass me the cheese? means "Please pass me the cheese" (where could is more polite). Either can be used with possibly: Can/could you possibly pass me the cheese? Requests with can't may sound impatient (Can't you be quiet?)

It is common to use can with verbs of perception such as see, hear, etc., as in I can see a tree. Aspectual distinctions can be made, such as I could see it (ongoing state) vs. I saw it (event).

Could have expresses counterfactual past ability or possibility: I could have told him if I had seen him; I could have told him yesterday (but I didn't).

Can have... is less common than may have....

Can may be negated by the addition of not /kən ˈnɒt/, analogously to the addition of not to could, may, will and so forth. It can also be negated by inflection; its commoner inflected form is can't /ˈkɑnt/, /ˈkɑnt/, or /kant/ (in RP, General American and General Australian respectively). However, it has an alternative inflected form, cannot /ˈkænɒt/. Can not and cannot thus differ in placement of the single stress. Can not is more formal than can't, and does not invert with its subject (Can't/*Cannot we leave now?).

Negated, could has the inflected form couldn't.

Negating can or could is external and negates the matrix clause, expressing inability, impermissibility or impossibility (I can't wear jeans). This differs from may or might used to express possibility: It can't be true does not mean It may not be true. Thus can't (or cannot) is often used to express disbelief even in possibility, as must expresses belief in the certainty. When the reference is to the past, have is used: He can't/cannot have done it means "It is not possible that he did it" (compare He must have done it).

With special stress, internal negation is possible: I can not wear a suit, if I wish means "I am not compelled to wear a suit if I don't want to".

=== May and might ===
The verb may expresses possibility in either an epistemic or deontic sense, that is, in terms of probability or permissibility. For example:

- The mouse may be dead means that it is possible that the mouse (perhaps audible until the day before) is now dead.
- Trevor may leave if he'd prefer to play with his friends means that Trevor is permitted to leave.

May can have future as well as present reference (He may arrive means that it is possible that he will arrive; I may go to the mall means that I am considering going to the mall).

The preterite form might is used as a synonym of may to express a possible circumstance (as can could – see above). It is sometimes said that might and could express more doubt than may. For uses of might in conditional sentences, and as a past equivalent to may in such contexts as indirect speech, see § Preterite forms above.

May (or might) can also express concession of a minor point: He may be taller than me, but he's certainly not stronger could mean "While I'd agree that he is taller than me, that is unimportant, as he's certainly not stronger."

May can indicate permission for present or future actions, or be a polite directive: You may go now. Might used in this way is milder: You might go now if you feel like it. Similarly, May I use your phone? is a request for permission; Might I use your phone? would be more hesitant or polite.

A less common use of may is optative (to express a wish), as in May you live long and happy (see also English subjunctive).

May have indicates uncertainty about a past circumstance, whereas might have can either have that meaning or refer to possibilities that did not occur but could have (see also conditional sentences above).

- She may have eaten the cake. (The speaker does not know whether she did.)
- She might have eaten the cake. (The speaker either does not know whether she did, or knows that she did not eat cake but that her eating it would have been possible.)

May have is used for possibility, not permission (although the second sense of might have might sometimes imply permission).

The inflected form mayn't is obsolete. The inflected form mightn't mostly appears in the tags of tag questions (It might snow tonight, mightn't it?) and in other questions expressing doubt (Mightn't I come in if I took my boots off?).

The result of negating may or might depends on whether the interpretation is epistemic (about likelihood) or deontic (about permission). In epistemic senses, the negation is "internal", of the subordinate clause (There may not be a vote on it this week). In deontic senses, the negation is normally external (You may not go to the party unless you finish your homework), but with special stress, internal negation is possible: (I may not attend church, if I wish, meaning "I have permission not to attend church").

=== Shall and should ===
The verb shall is used in some varieties of English in place of will when the subject is first person (I shall, we shall).

With second- and third-person subjects, shall indicates a directive or prophecy: Cinderella, you shall go to the ball! It is often used in writing laws and specifications: Those convicted of violating this law shall be imprisoned for a term of not less than three years; The device shall be able to operate within a normal temperature range.

Shall is sometimes used in requests for advice or confirmation of a suggestion: Shall I read now?; What shall we wear?

Should is sometimes used as a first-person equivalent to would (in its conditional and "future-in-the-past" uses) in the same way that shall can replace will. Should is also used for a protasis with future reference: either with the preposition if (If you should meet her, please give her this) or with subject–auxiliary inversion (Should you meet her, please give her this).

Should is often used to describe an expected or recommended act or state. It can be used to give advice or to describe normative behavior, though without such strong obligatory force as must or have to. Thus, You should never lie describes a social or ethical norm. It can also express what is expected: This should work. In these uses it is equivalent to ought.

Both shall and should can be used with have (shall/should have (done)) in their role as first-person equivalents of will and would (thus to form future perfect or conditional perfect structures). Also, shall have may express an order with perfective aspect (You shall have finished your duties by nine o'clock). When should is used in that way, it usually expresses something that would have been expected at some time in the past but did not in fact happen (or is not known to have happened): I should have done that yesterday ("It would have been expedient, or expected of me, to do that yesterday").

The negative inflections are shan't and shouldn't.

Negating should negates the subordinate clause: the negation is internal (You shouldn't use botox). (To negate the meaning of I should, one may useI ought not to or I am not supposed to.)

As for any modal auxiliary, a negative interrogative (Shouldn't you check your credit card statement?) instead negates the matrix clause.

=== Will and would ===
- Will often expresses futurity (The next meeting will be held on Thursday). Since this is an expression of time rather than modality, constructions with will (or sometimes shall; see "Shall and should" above) are often called the future tense. For those speakers who for first-person subjects (I, we) use shall to express futurity, the use of will for these indicates particular resolve. (Future events are also sometimes described with the present tense (see Uses of English verb forms), or using the going to construction.)
- Will can express habitual aspect or dynamic modality; for example, He will make mistakes (in which will is usually stressed somewhat) may mean that he seems often to make them.

Will also has these uses as a modal:

- It can express strong probability with present time reference, as in That will be John at the door.
- It can be used to give an indirect order, as in You will do it right now.

Modal uses of the preterite form would include:

- Would is used in some conditional sentences.
- Expression of politeness, as in I would like to... (to politely state a preference) and Would you (be so kind as to) do this? (for "Please do this").

As a tense marker, would is used for

- Future of the past, as in I knew I would graduate two years later. Would is the past form of future will as described above under § Preterite forms. (It is sometimes replaced by should in the first person in the same way that will is replaced by shall.)

As an aspect marker, would is used for

- Expression of habitual aspect in the past, as in Back then, I would eat early and would walk to school.

Both will and would can be used with have (will have, would have) to form the future perfect and conditional perfect forms already referred to, or to express perfective aspect in their other meanings (e.g. there will have been an arrest order, expressing strong probability).

The negative inflections are won't and wouldn't. For contracted forms of will and would themselves, see "Weak forms", above.

Negating will or would is "internal" and negates the subordinate clause. (I won't be surprised if it rains means I will be unsurprised if it rains.) But as for any modal auxiliary, a negative interrogative (Won't/Wouldn't we submit them in person?) negates the matrix clause.

==== Would rather, would sooner, and would as soon ====
Would rather, would sooner, or would as soon can take as its complement either a bare infinitival clause (She would rather go herself) or a declarative content clause (She would rather (that) I went). They are PPIs: although I would rather not catch the virus (with negation of the clause that is subordinate to would rather) is idiomatic, *I wouldn't rather catch the virus (with negation of the matrix clause) is distinctly strange. Whether its reference is to past, present or future, the declarative content clause complement can use the preterite: I'd rather you hadn't told her that (past counterfactual); I'd rather you didn't tell her that (present/future); I'd rather you didn't tell her that when you meet her (future).

=== Mote and must ===
Originally, mote was used to express obligation in the present, while must fulfilled this role in the past. As mote gradually disappeared from everyday usage, must took over this function in contemporary English. Today, mote, as a modal verb, remains only in a few expressions, most notably: So mote it be.

Having assumed the present sense of obligation, must differs from the central modal auxiliary verbs in lacking a preterite. It expresses obligation or necessity: You must use this form; We must try to escape. It can also express a conclusion reached by indirect evidence (e.g. Sue must be at home).

When used with have and a past participle, must has only an epistemic flavor: Sue must have left means that the speaker concludes that Sue has left. To express obligation or necessity in the past, had to or some other synonym must be used.

The negative inflection of must is mustn't. Negation of must is "internal", negating the subordinate clause: (You must not/mustn't drive after smoking a joint means that not driving is what you must do). But as for any modal auxiliary, a negative interrogative (Mustn't we hide the dope?) negates the matrix clause. To express the lack of requirement or obligation, the negative of have to or need (see below) can be used: You don't have to do this; You needn't do this.

Negated, must is not commonly used in an epistemic sense, where it is common to use can't (It can't be here; Sue can't have left) instead.

Mustn't can nonetheless be used as a simple negative of must in tag questions and other questions expressing doubt: We must do it, mustn't we? Mustn't he be in the operating room by this stage?

Must and needs can occur in sequence. Hendrik Poutsma writes that "The force of must, notably that of representing the subject under pressure of an overmastering desire [. . . ], is often emphasized by needs." Examples of the pair are:

- The control of the Firm needs must stay within the Family.
- It needs must be said that any observation made in this order shall not be taken as observations on merits
- thinking it through to its ultimate logical consequences must needs lead to insoluble contradictions
- the Constitution envisions, and by extension the country as a whole must needs have, a truly high-minded Supreme Court

=== Ought ===
Ought differs from the central modal auxiliary verbs both in taking as its complement a to-infinitival rather than a bare infinitival clause (compare He should go with He ought to go) and in lacking a preterite.

One can't use to after ought in questions tags. It is also possible to omit to using ellipsis or in negatives.

Ought is used with meanings similar to those of should, expressing expectation or requirement.

The reduced pronunciation of ought to (see "Weak forms" above) is sometimes spelt oughtta.

Ought can be used with have in the same way as should (plus intervening to): You ought to have done that earlier. Ought not to or oughtn't to can be substituted for shouldn't.

Had better has a similar meaning to should and ought for a deontic meaning (expressing recommended or expedient behavior (You ought to / should / had better arrive on time), but not (other perhaps than jokingly) for an epistemic meaning (The Sun ought to / should / ?had better come out soon).

Negating ought is "internal" and negates the subordinate clause (I ought not to have a third glassful means that what I ought to do is decline the glassful). But as for any modal auxiliary, a negative interrogative (Oughtn't we to offer cola as well as beer?) negates the matrix clause.

The use of ought as a lexical verb as in They didn't ought to go is generally thought of as restricted to nonstandard dialects but has been described as also sometimes found in informal standard usage. "Lexical ought with the dummy operator do has been condemned in British usage handbooks. . . . What this censure suggests is that lexical ought with periphrastic do is a well-established usage in colloquial [British English]."

Data from a corpus of American and British spoken and written English of the 1980s and 1990s show that ought not to, oughtn't to (both modal auxiliary) and didn't ought to are rare in both American and British English, whether written or spoken. I don't think you ought to and similar are commonly used instead. In interrogatives, ought does not appear in American conversation or fiction or in British conversation. In British fiction, the modal auxiliary is used (Ought we to . . . ?), not lexical ought with do-support.

=== Need ===
As a modal auxiliary verb, need is a negative polarity item, appearing in negative contexts and other contexts that do not affirm. Thus:

- No one need remain silent.
- We need not remain silent.
- Need we remain silent?
- *We need remain silent.

Like must, modal need has no preterite form.

Although as a modal auxiliary verb need takes a bare infinitival clause complement (He needn't overhaul it), lexical verb need can take either an object complement (He needs my help) or a to-infinitival clause complement (He needs to overhaul it), optionally with a subject (He needs me to overhaul it).

Negation of need is external, negating the matrix clause. You needn't apply again does not say that there is a need not to apply, merely that there is no need to apply. So although the verb must can usually be substituted for the modal verb need, mustn't usually cannot be substituted for needn't. (Exceptionally, the pair are synonymous in polar interrogatives: Needn't/mustn't we pay now?)

Modal need can also be used with have: Need I have done that? It is most commonly used here in the negative, meaning that an action was (from the present perspective) not in fact necessary: You needn't have left that tip.

Data from a corpus of American and British spoken and written English of the 1980s and 1990s show that for negative constructions involving need, modal auxiliary need is more common in written English (both American and British), but is less common than lexical need in British English conversation and unused in American English conversation. In both American and British English, interrogative constructions that require subject–auxiliary inversion show do-support of lexical need much more commonly than inversion of auxiliary need; moreover, many of what instances there are of auxiliary need are of fixed formulas (Need I say more?, etc).

For "needs must" (and "must needs") see under must.

=== Dare ===
As a modal auxiliary verb, dare is another negative negative polarity item, appearing in negative contexts and other contexts that do not affirm.

Dare is now more common as a lexical verb. Lexical verb dare takes a to-infinitival clause as its complement (I didn't dare to answer her), and this may have a subject (He dared me to dive from a higher board); modal dare, a bare infinitival clause complement.

Negation of dare is external: what is negated is the matrix clause. (She dare not attempt it means "She doesn't dare to attempt it".)

Examples of the use of modal auxiliary dare, followed by equivalents using lexical dare where appropriate:

- If he dare try it, he may succeed. ("If he dares to try it, he may succeed.")
- If he dared try it, he might succeed. ("If he dared to try it, he might succeed.")
- Dare he do it? ("Does he dare to do it?")
- Dared he do it? ("Did he dare to do it?")
- I daren't (or dare not) try. ("I don't dare to try.")
- I dared not try. ("I didn't dare to try.")
- How dare you! (formulaic expression of outrage)
- I dare say (or daresay) it's true. (Another formulaic expression, here exceptionally in an affirmative context, unexpected for an NPI)

However, its affirmative context causes *He dared speak up to be ungrammatical.

Although seemingly less common, the negative form daredn't is still attested in use:

- "I daredn't hurry," said Mr Colclough, setting us down at the station. "I was afraid of a skid."
- One's so safe with such a son to con her / Through all the noises and through all the press, / Boys daredn't squirt tormenters on her dress.

Dared has supplanted an earlier preterite form, durst. Examples:

- The former [. . .] retired with cattle and other booty to their mountains, whither they knew well the Lowlanders durst not follow them.
- Other debts I durst not face.
- dizzy church-crowned central peak that time durst not touch

Durst had a negative inflected form, durstn't. Examples:

- I'm under authority, you know, and durstn't overstep
- the boat, where I durstn't kick for fear of poking my feet through the bottom
- I durstn't go home to tell Mother Pring

Lexical verb dare is close to an NPI: She dared to speak up is much less likely than She didn't dare to speak up. And the lexical–modal distinction is blurred: "lexical dare commonly occurs in non-affirmative contexts without to": She wouldn't dare ask her father; and it also can be stranded, as in She ought to have asked for a raise, but she didn't dare.

Data from a corpus of American and British spoken and written English of the 1980s and 1990s show that dare (modal or lexical) is infrequent and "is found chiefly in fiction and [British English] conversation". In negative constructions in American fiction, lexical dare is more common. In Britain, modal auxiliary dare is. Further, negation of preterite dared is rare. In both American and British English, interrogative constructions that require subject–auxiliary inversion show inversion of auxiliary dare much more commonly than do-support of lexical dare; however, many of the instances here of auxiliary dare are of fixed formulas (How dare you . . . ?, etc).

=== Used ===
Used /just/ is more commonly encountered as a lexical than as an auxiliary verb, particularly for younger or American speakers. The plain form use (sometimes spelt ⟨used⟩) of the lexical verb is seen in Did you use to play tennis?. Although rare, its preterite perfect had used is attested. The first of The Cambridge Grammar of the English Language's five criteria for modal auxiliary verbs is irrelevant to auxiliary verb used, which fails the last three. The auxiliary verb "is also semantically quite distinct from the modal auxiliaries: the meaning it expresses is aspectual, not modal." The Cambridge Grammar does not class auxiliary used as a modal auxiliary verb.

As an auxiliary verb, used is attested in forms that lack do-support, notably in the negative form used not to or usedn't to (We used not to worry much about money) and in the interrogative form with subject–auxiliary inversion (Used he to play the guitar?). More recently, however, used has increasingly been treated as a lexical verb rather than an auxiliary, and therefore typically takes do-support. As a result, the negative used not to may be replaced by didn’t use to (You didn’t use to be so stressed). Likewise, the interrogative form (Used you to live here?) may be supplanted by do-support forms (Did you use to live here?).

For more about use, see English auxiliary verbs.

=== Modal idioms with have ===
The verb had in the expression had better lacks any untensed form (*Tomorrow you will have better concentrate; *I've had better work hard since I started; *We're having better concentrate) and hence is sometimes classed as a modal idiom, a semi-modal, or an emerging or quasi-modal verb.

Negating had better, whether by had better not or by hadn't better, normally negates the subordinate clause: it is internal (You'd better not stick around). However, as for any modal auxiliary, a negative interrogative (Hadn't we better scarper before the police come?) negates the matrix clause.

Had best and had rather similarly lack any untensed form. Had best is much less common than had better. Since had rather and would rather are both likely to be realized as 'd rather, it is rarely easy to decide which of the pair is being used.

Hendrik Poutsma adds:

I had as lief (or lieve), although now antiquated and mostly replaced by I had as soon, has never fallen completely into disuse. . . . The shortening of had to 'd has given rise to would being sometimes substituted for it.

== Frequency of use ==
During the second half of the 20th century, the frequencies of use of both the modal auxiliary verbs and of alternatives to them showed considerable change. A comparison of the frequencies in the British corpora LOB and FLOB (with material from 1961 and 1991 respectively), and of those in the American corpora Brown and Frown (1961 and 1992 material respectively) shows:

Changes in frequencies of use of English modals and quasi-modals
Modals			Quasi-modals		
	BrE	AmE		BrE	AmE
can	(+2.2%)	(–1.5%)	be going to	(–1.2%)	+51.6%
could	(+2.4%)	–6.8%	be to	–17.2%	–40.1%
may	–17.4%	–32.4%	had better	(–26.0%)	(–17.1%)
might	–15.1%	(–4.5%)	have got to	(–34.1%)	(+15.6%)
must	–29.0%	–34.4%	have to	(+9.0%)	(+1.1%)
need	–40.2%	(–12.5%)	need to	+249.1%	+123.2%
ought to	–44.2%	(–30.0%)	be supposed to	+113.6%	(+6.3%)
shall	–43.7%	–43.8%	want to	+18.5%	+70.9%
should	–11.8%	–13.5%			
will	(–2.7%)	–11.1%			
would	–11.0%	–6.1%			

(Percentage changes shown in parentheses come with χ^{2} values of greater than 0.05; they are of less statistical significance.)

A study of modal auxiliary verbs and quasi-modals in American, British and Australian examples (given equal weight) of a variety of genres of written and spoken English in the 1990s found that the totals were:

Frequencies of use of English modals and quasi-modals
Modals		Quasi-modals	
can	7663	be able to	889
could	3557	be about to	124
may	2261	be bound to	27
might	1499	be going to	2721
must	1367	be supposed to	171
need	56	be to	371
ought to	126	had better	89
shall	343	have got to	705
should	2432	have to	2827
will	8505	need to	716
would	7775	want to	1897
Total	35584	Total	10537

Commenting on a different but similar set of figures, Longman Grammar of Spoken and Written English observes of ought, need, dare, and use /jus/:

In view of the considerable attention given to these marginal auxiliaries in grammatical descriptions of English and English language teaching materials, it is worth noting how rare they are, particularly in negative and interrogative auxiliary constructions.

== Deduction ==
In English, modal verbs as must, have, got and could/can are used to express deduction and contention. The modal verbs state how sure the speaker is about something.

- You're shivering – you must be cold.
- Someone must have taken the key: it is not here.
- I didn't order ten books. This has to be a mistake.
- These aren't mine – they've got to be yours.
- It can't be a burglar. All the doors and windows are locked.

== Modals at the head of chains ==
The verb governed by the modal may be another auxiliary (necessarily one that can appear in plain form—this includes be and have, but not another modal, except in the non-standard cases described below under § Double modals). Hence, a modal may introduce a chain of verb forms in which the other auxiliaries express properties such as aspect and voice, as in He must have been given a new job. If infinitival to is regarded as an auxiliary verb, then longer chains are possible, as in He must have been encouraged to try to serve tea.

=== Double modals ===
In Standard English, since a modal auxiliary verb is followed by a verb in its plain form (which modals lack), it cannot be followed by a second modal auxiliary verb. Might have is grammatical (have is here the plain form of a non-modal verb), but *might must is not.

However, what appear to be sequences of modal auxiliary verbs occur. Might could, must can, might oughta, might would, must could, could oughta, might should, may can, should oughta, might can, may could, would oughta, might will, may will, may should are some of the 76 combinations attested in Southern American English. Those with might as the first modal are easily the most common, and might could is the most common of them all. Longer sequences such as might should oughta are also attested. In Britain, by contrast, the most common is would might although commonness is relative: double modal auxiliary verbs "occur only rarely in spontaneous speech, even in varieties in which they are known to be used".

The syntactic status of sequences such as might could and would might is unclear. One possibility is that might has been reanalysed by the speaker as an English adverb and thus be functioning as an adjunct.

Two rules from different grammatical models supposedly disallow the construction. Phrase structure grammar sees the surface clause as allowing only one modal verb, and main verb analysis dictates that modal verbs occur in finite forms.

== Comparison with other Germanic languages ==
Many English modals have cognates in other Germanic languages, if often with different meanings. Unlike the English modals, however, such verbs are not generally defective:

- In German: mögen, müssen, können, sollen, wollen; cognates of may, must, can, shall, and will. Although German shares five modal verbs with English, their meanings are often quite different. Mögen does not mean "be allowed" but "may" as epistemic modal and "like" as a normal verb followed by a noun phrase. It can be followed by an infinitive with the meaning of "have a desire (to do something)". Wollen means "will" only in the sense of "want (to do something)" and is not used for future reference, for which werden is used instead. Müssen, können, and sollen are used similarly to English "must", "can", and "shall". The negation of müssen is a literal one in German, not an inverse one as in English": German ich muss ("I must") means "I need (to do something)", and ich muss nicht (literally "I must not") accordingly means "I don't need (to do something)". In English, "have (to do something)" behaves the same way, whereas English "must" expresses an interdiction when negated. brauchen (need) is sometimes used like a modal verb, especially negated (Er braucht nicht kommen. "He need not come.").
- In Dutch: mogen, moeten, kunnen, zullen, willen; cognates of may, must, can, shall, and will.
- In Danish: måtte, kunne, ville, skulle, cognates of may/must, can, will, shall. They generally have the same meanings as in English, with the exception of ville, which usually means "want (to do something)" (but can also mean "will").
- In Swedish: må (past tense: måtte), måsta, kunna, vilja, ska(ll), cognates of may/might, must, can, will, shall. Their meanings generally correspond to those in English with the exception of vilja, which means "want (to do something)".

Since modal verbs in other Germanic languages are not defective, the problem of double modals (see above) does not arise: the second modal verb in such a construction simply takes the infinitive form like for any verb in the same position. Compare the following translations of English "I want to be able to dance", all of which translate literally as "I want can dance" (except the German, as "I want dance can"):

- German: Ich will tanzen können.
- Dutch: Ik wil kunnen dansen.
- Danish: Jeg vil kunne danse.
- Swedish: Jag vill kunna dansa.

== See also ==
- Tense–aspect–mood § Invariant auxiliaries
