= English subjunctive =

English embedded clause type marking non-real possibilities

While the English language lacks distinct inflections for mood, an English subjunctive is recognized in most grammars. Definition and scope of the concept vary widely across the literature, but it is generally associated with the description of something other than apparent reality. Traditionally, the term is applied loosely to cases in which one might expect a subjunctive form in related languages, especially Old English and Latin. This includes conditional clauses, wishes, and reported speech. Modern descriptive grammars limit the term to cases in which some grammatical marking can be observed, nevertheless coming to varying definitions.

In particular, The Cambridge Grammar of the English Language narrows the definition further so that the usage of were, as in "I wish she were here", traditionally known as the "past subjunctive", is instead called irrealis. According to this narrow definition, the subjunctive is a grammatical construction recognizable by its use of the bare form of a verb in a finite clause that describes a non-actual scenario. For instance, "It's essential that he be here" uses the subjunctive mood while "It's essential that he is here" does not.

== Grammatical composition ==
The English subjunctive is realized as a finite but tenseless clause. Subjunctive clauses use a bare or plain verb form, which lacks any inflection. For instance, a subjunctive clause would use the verb form "be" rather than "am/is/are" and "arrive" rather than "arrives", regardless of the person and number of the subject.

(1) Subjunctive clauses:

a. It's crucial that he be here by noon
b. It's vital that he arrive on time

English does not have a distinct subjunctive verb form, since the bare verb form is not exclusively subjunctive. It is also used in other constructions, such as imperatives and infinitivals.

(2) Imperative:

a. Be here by noon!
b. Arrive on time!

For almost all verbs, the bare form is syncretic with the present tense form used in all persons except the third person singular.

(3) Present indicative: I always arrive on time.

One exception to this generalization is the defective verb beware, which has no indicative form. Another is the irregular verb be, whose bare form is not syncretic with any of its indicative forms:

(4) Present indicative:

a. I am…
b. She is…
c. You/we/they are…

=== Finiteness ===
Subjunctive clauses are considered finite since they have obligatory subjects, alternate with tensed forms, and are often introduced by the complementizer that.

=== Triggering contexts ===
Subjunctive clauses most commonly appear as clausal complements of non-veridical operators. The most common use of the English subjunctive is the mandative or jussive subjunctive, which is optionally used in the clausal complements of some predicates whose meanings involve obligation.

(5) Mandative subjunctive:

a. I insist that he leave us alone. (instead of "leaves us")
b. I would rather someone else do it. ("does it")
c. We demand that it be done tomorrow. ("is done")
d. My recommendation is that they not be punished. ("are not punished"; note that the parallel word order "that they be not punished" was formerly standard but is now archaic, as in "Their hands shall be weakened from the work, that it be not done" from the King James Bible.)

The following pair illustrates the semantic contribution of the subjunctive mandative. The subjunctive example unambiguously expresses a desire for a future situation, whereas the non-subjunctive (indicative) example is potentially ambiguous, either (i) expressing a desire to change the addressee's beliefs about the current situation, or (ii) as a "covert mandative", having the same meaning as the subjunctive mandative.

(6) Subjunctive mandative compared:

a. Subjunctive mandative: I insist that Andrea be here.
b. Indicative (whether non-mandative or covert mandative): I insist that Andrea is here.

The subjunctive is thus not the only means of marking an embedded clause as mandative: examples can be ambiguous between mandative and non-mandative interpretations, and dialects vary in their use of the subjunctive. In particular, the subjunctive is more widely used in American English than in British English. (Note: For more on the increasing use of the mandative subjunctive in British English as influenced by American English, see §3.59 in Quirk, Randolph; Greenbaum, Sidney; Leech, Geoffrey; Svartik, Jan (1985). A Comprehensive Grammar of the English Language. Longman. ISBN 0-582-51734-6.) (The covert mandative is very unusual in American English.)

Use of the subjunctive mandative increased during the 20th century in American, British, and Australian English.

The subjunctive is occasionally found in clauses expressing a probable condition, such as If I be found guilty… (more common is am or should be; for more information see English conditional sentences). This usage is mostly old-fashioned or formal, although it is found in some common fixed expressions such as if need be.

Somewhat more common is the use after whether in the exhaustive conditional construction: "He must be tended with the same care, whether he be friend or foe." In both of these uses, it is possible to invert subject and verb and omit the subordinator, i.e. "He must be tended with the same care, be he friend or foe." Analogous uses are occasionally found after other words, such as unless, until, whoever, wherever:

(7)

a. Your purpose, then, plainly stated, is that you will destroy the Government, unless you be allowed to construe and enforce the Constitution as you please, on all points in dispute between you and us.
b. Whoever he be, he shall not go unpunished.

In most of the above examples, a construction with should can be used as an alternative: "I insist that he should leave now" etc. This "should mandative" was the most common kind of mandative at the start of the 20th century, not only in British English but also in American English. However, in American English its use decreased rapidly in the early 20th century and it had become very unusual by the 21st; in British English its use also decreased, but later and not so drastically.

Unlike in Spanish, the subjunctive is not generally used after verbs such as hope and expect.

Using the subjunctive or should is mandatory in clauses with the conjunction lest, which generally expresses a potential adverse event:

(8)

a. I am running faster lest she catch me (i.e., "in order that she not catch me")
b. I was worried lest she catch me (i.e., "that she might catch me")

Subjunctive clauses can occasionally occur unembedded, with the force of a wish or a third person imperative (and such forms can alternatively be analyzed as imperatives). This is most common nowadays in formulaic remnants of archaic optative constructions, such as "(God) bless you", "God save the King", "heaven forbid", "peace be with you" (any of which can instead start with may: "May God bless you", etc.); (Note: An example is America, America, God shed His grace on thee, and crown thy good with brotherhood (from "America the Beautiful"). Similarly, the traditional English text of the Aaronic blessing is cast entirely in the subjunctive, with jussive force: The Lord bless thee and keep thee. The Lord make His face to shine upon thee. The Lord lift up His countenance upon thee and give thee peace.) "long live…"; "truth be told", "so be it", "suffice it to say", "woe betide…", and more.

== Variant terminology and misconceptions ==
The term "subjunctive" has been extended to other grammatical phenomena in English which do not comprise a natural class. Traditional grammars of English sometimes apply the term to verb forms used in subjunctive clauses, regardless of their other uses. Some traditional grammars refer to non-factual instances of irrealis "were" as "past subjunctives". So do modern descriptive grammars, while noting that the "past" is misleading as it does not correspond to tense, using the traditionalist term only to differentiate it from the "present subjunctive" discussed in this article. The term "subjunctive" is sometimes extended further to describe any grammatical reflection of modal remoteness or counterfactuality. For instance, conditionals with a counterfactual or modally remote meaning are sometimes referred to as "counterfactual conditionals", even by those who acknowledge it as a misnomer. The English subjunctive is the subject of many common misconceptions, such as that it is a tense, that its use is decreasing when it is in fact increasing, and that it is necessary or sufficient for counterfactuality in conditionals. Writing in the Chronicle of Higher Education, Geoff Pullum argued that mention of the subjunctive is often used as a status symbol:

Virtually none of the things people believe about the subjunctive or its status in English are true. Most purists who witter on about it couldn’t actually pass a test on distinguishing subjunctive from nonsubjunctive clauses to save their sorry asterisks. But then they don’t have to: Merely mentioning the subjunctive approvingly and urging that it be taught is enough to establish one’s credentials as a better class of person.

== Historical change ==
Old English had a morphological subjunctive, which was lost by the time of Early Modern English. The syntactic subjunctive of Modern English was more widely used in the past than it is today.

Examples of subjunctive uses in archaic modern English:

- I will not let thee go, except [=unless] thou bless me. (King James Bible, Genesis 32:26)
- Murder, though it have no tongue, will speak. (Shakespeare, Hamlet)

Older forms of modern English also make greater use of subject–auxiliary inversion in subjunctive clauses:

- Should you feel hungry, … (equivalent to If you (should) feel hungry)
- Be he called on by God, … (equivalent to "If he be (i.e. If he is) called on by God, …")
- Be they friend or foe, … (equivalent to "(No matter) whether they be friend or foe, …")
- Be it ever so humble, there's no place like home (from "Home! Sweet Home!"; meaning "even though")

Some examples of this sort survive in common usage as set expressions:

- "come what may"
- "God forbid"
- "so be it"
- "so help me God"
- "be that as it may"

The construction also sees occasional modern use outside of these set phrases, mostly as an intentional archaism, particularly in the above-mentioned exhaustive conditional construction (Be he friend or foe).

== See also ==
- Habitual be

== Bibliography ==
- Fowler, H.W. (2015). Butterfield, Jeremy (ed.). Fowler's Dictionary of Modern English Usage. Oxford University Press. ISBN 978-0-19-966135-0.
- Huddleston, Rodney; Pullum, Geoffrey K. (2002). The Cambridge Grammar of the English Language. Cambridge; New York: Cambridge University Press. ISBN 0-521-43146-8.
- Rohdenburg, Günter; Schlüter, Julia, eds. (2009). One Language, Two Grammars? Differences between British and American English. Cambridge: Cambridge University Press. ISBN 978-0-521-87219-5.
- Merriam-Webster's Concise Dictionary of English Usage. Penguin. 2002. ISBN 9780877796336.
