= Comparative sentence =

Syntactic construction that serves to express a comparison

In general linguistics, a comparative sentence serves to express a comparison between two (or more) entities or groups of entities in terms of a certain quality or action. A comparative sentence contains an adjective or an adverb in the comparative degree.

The syntax of comparative constructions is poorly understood due to the complexity of the data. In particular, the comparative frequently occurs with independent mechanisms of syntax such as coordination and forms of ellipsis (gapping, pseudogapping, null complement anaphora, stripping, verb phrase ellipsis). The interaction of the various mechanisms complicates the analysis.

== Absolute and null forms ==
A number of fixed expressions use a comparative form where no comparison is being asserted, such as higher education or younger generation. These comparatives can be called absolute.

Similarly, a null comparative is one in which the starting point for comparison is not stated. These comparisons are frequently found in advertising, for example, in typical assertions such as Our burgers have more flavor, Our picture is sharper or 50% more. These uses of the comparative do not mention what it is they are being compared to. In some cases it is easy to infer what the missing element in a null comparative is. In other cases, the speaker or writer has been deliberately vague, for example "Glasgow's miles better".

Scientific classification, taxonomy, and geographical categorization conventionally include the adjectives greater and lesser, when a large or small variety of an item is meant, as in the greater celandine as opposed to the lesser celandine. These adjectives may at first sight appear as a kind of null comparative, when as is usual, they are cited without their opposite counterpart. It should be apparent, however, that an entirely different variety of animal, scientific, or geographical object is intended. Thus it may be found, for example, that the lesser panda entails a giant panda variety, and a gazetteer would establish that there are the Lesser Antilles as well as the Greater Antilles. It is in the nature of grammatical conventions evolving over time that it is difficult to establish when they first became widely accepted, but both greater and lesser in these instances have over time become mere adjectives (or adverbial constructs), so losing their comparative connotation. Further, Greater indicates the inclusion of adjacent areas when referring to metropolitan areas, such as when suburbs are intended. Although it implies a comparison with a narrower definition that refers to a central city only, such as Greater London versus the City of London, or Greater New York versus New York City, it is not part of the "comparative" in the grammatical sense of this article. A comparative always compares something directly with something else.

== Comparative coordination vs. comparative subordination ==
At times the syntax of comparatives matches the syntax of coordination, and at other times, it must be characterized in terms of subordination.

=== Comparative coordination ===
The syntax of comparatives can closely mirror the syntax of coordination. The similarity in structure across the following a- and b-sentences illustrates this point. The conjuncts of the coordinate structures are enclosed in square brackets:

a. [The boys] and [the girls] sent flowers to him today.
b. More [boys] than [girls] sent flowers to him today.

a. [The boys sent] and [the girls dropped off] flowers for him today.
b. [More boys sent] than [girls dropped off] flowers for him today.

a. The boys sent [flowers to him] and [chocolates to her] today.
b. More boys sent [flowers to him] than [chocolates to her] today.

a. The boys sent [flowers to him today] and [chocolates to her yesterday].
b. More boys sent [flowers to him today] than [chocolates to her yesterday].

The structure of the b-sentences involving comparatives is closely similar to the structure of the a-sentences involving coordination. Based on this similarity, many have argued that the syntax of comparatives overlaps with the syntax of coordination at least some of the time. In this regard, the than in the b-sentences should be viewed as a coordinator (coordinate conjunction), not as a subordinator (subordinate conjunction).

=== Comparative subordination ===
Examples of the comparative that do not allow an analysis in terms of coordination (because the necessary parallel structures are not present) are instances of comparative subordination. In such cases, than has the status of a preposition or a subordinator (subordinate conjunction), e.g.

a. We invited more people than wanted to come.

b. A better striker was playing for them than we have.

c. More passengers than the airline had issued tickets tried to board the plane.

d. More guests than we had chairs showed up.

e. Who did he eat more hotdogs than?

Since the parallel structures associated with coordinate structures, i.e., the conjuncts, cannot be acknowledged in these sentences, the only analysis available is one in terms of subordination, whereby than has the status of a subordinator (as in sentences a-d) or of a preposition (as in sentence e). What this means is that the syntax of comparatives is complex because at times an analysis in terms of coordination is warranted, whereas at other times, the analysis must assume subordination.

== Comparative deletion and subdeletion ==
There are two types of ellipsis that are unique to the than-clauses of comparatives: comparative deletion and comparative subdeletion. The existence of comparative deletion as an ellipsis mechanism is widely acknowledged, whereas the status of comparative subdeletion as an ellipsis mechanism is more controversial.

=== Comparative deletion ===
Comparative deletion is an obligatory ellipsis mechanism that occurs in the than-clause of a comparative construction. The elided material of comparative deletion is indicated using a blank, and the unacceptable b-sentences show what is construed as having been elided in the a-sentences:

a. Fred reads more books than Susan reads ___.
b. *Fred reads more books than Susan reads books. - Sentence is bad because comparative deletion has not occurred.

a. We invited more people than ___ came.
b. *We invited more people than people came. - Sentence is bad because comparative deletion has not occurred.

a. She was happier than I was ___.
b. *She was happier than I was happy. - Sentence is bad because comparative deletion has not occurred.

=== Comparative subdeletion ===
Comparative subdeletion is a second type of ellipsis in comparatives that some accounts acknowledge. It occurs when the focused constituent in the than-clause is not deleted because it is distinct from its counterpart in the main clause. In other words, comparative subdeletion occurs when comparative deletion does not because the constituents being compared are distinct, e.g.

a. He has more cats than he has __ dogs.

b. Fewer women showed up than __ men wanted to dance.

c. You were happier than I was __ sad.

b. The table is as wide as it is __ tall.

Accounts that acknowledge comparative subdeletion posit a null measure expression in the position marked by the blank (x-many, x-much). This element serves to focus the expression in the same way that -er or more focuses its counterpart in the main clause. Various arguments are put forth that motivate the existence of this null element. These arguments will not be reproduced here, though. Suffice it to say that the sentences in which subdeletion is supposedly occurring are qualitatively different from sentences in which comparative deletion occurs, e.g., He has more cats than you have ___ .

== Independent ellipsis mechanisms in than-clauses ==
There are a number of independent ellipsis mechanisms that occur in the than-clauses of comparative constructions: gapping, pseudogapping, null complement anaphora, stripping, and verb phrase ellipsis. These mechanisms are independent of comparative clauses because they also occur when the comparative is not involved. The presence of these ellipsis mechanisms in than-clauses complicates the analysis considerably, since they render it difficult to discern which aspects of the syntax of comparatives are unique to comparatives.

a. You should visit me on Tuesday, and I ___ you on Wednesday. - Gapping without the comparative
b. You visited me on Tuesdays more than I ___ you on Wednesdays. - Gapping with the comparative

a. He will say it twice before she has ___ once. - Pseudogapping without the comparative
b. More people will say it twice than ___ will ___ just once. - Pseudogapping with the comparative; comparative deletion also present

a. He did it as I expected ___ . - Null complement anaphora without the comparative
b. He did it more than I expected ___ . - Null complement anaphora with the comparative

a. Men did it, and women ___ too. - Stripping without the comparative
b. More men did it than women ___ . - Stripping analysis possible here

a. Susan has helped when you have ___ . - Verb phrase ellipsis without the comparative
b. Susan has helped more than you have ___ . - Verb phrase ellipsis with the comparative

The fact that the five independent ellipsis mechanisms (and possibly others) can occur in the than-clauses of comparatives has rendered the study of the syntax of comparatives particularly difficult. One is often not sure which ellipsis mechanisms are involved in a given than-clause. One thing is clear, however: the five ellipsis mechanisms illustrated here are distinct from the two ellipsis mechanisms that are unique to comparatives mentioned above (comparative deletion and comparative subdeletion).

== See also ==
- Coordination
- Double comparative
- Ellipsis
- Gapping
- Pseudogapping
- Stripping
- Subordination
- Verb phrase ellipsis
