= Future perfect =

Grammatical tense+aspect indicating an event will have finished by a future time

The future perfect is a verb form or construction used to describe an event that is expected or planned to happen before a time of reference in the future, such as will have finished in the English sentence "I will have finished by tomorrow." It is a grammatical combination of the future tense, or other marking of future time, and the perfect, a grammatical aspect that views an event as prior and completed.

== English ==
In English, the future perfect construction consists of a future construction such as the auxiliary verb will (or shall) or the going-to future and the perfect infinitive of the main verb (which consists of the infinitive of the auxiliary verb have and the past participle of the main verb). This parallels the construction of the "normal" future verb forms combining the same first components with the plain infinitive (e.g. She will fall / She is going to fall). For example:

- She will have fallen asleep by the time we get home.
- I shall have gone by then.
- Will you have finished when I get back?

The auxiliary is commonly contracted to 'll in speech and often in writing, and the first part of the perfect infinitive is commonly contracted to 've in speech: see English auxiliaries and contractions. The negative form is made with will not or shall not; these have their own contractions won't and shan't. Some examples:

- I'll have made the dinner by 6 PM.
- He won't have done (or will not have done) it by this evening.
- Won't you have finished by Thursday? (or Will you not have finished by Thursday?)

Most commonly the future perfect is used with a time marker that indicates by when (i.e., prior to what point in time) the event is to occur, as in the previous examples. However, it is also possible for it to be accompanied by a marker of the retrospective time of occurrence, as in "I will have done it on the previous Tuesday". This is in contrast to the present perfect, which is not normally used with a marker of past time: one would not say "I have done it last Tuesday", since the inclusion of the past time marker last Tuesday would entail the use of the simple past rather than the present perfect.

The English future perfect places the action relative only to the absolute future reference point, without specifying the location in time relative to the present. In most cases the action will be in the future relative to the present, but this is not necessarily the case: for example, "If it rains tomorrow, we will have worked in vain yesterday."

The future perfect construction with will (like other constructions with that auxiliary) is sometimes used to refer to a confidently assumed present situation rather than a future situation, as in "He will have woken up by now."

The time of perspective of the English future perfect can be shifted from the present to the past by replacing will with its past tense form would, thus effectively creating a "past of the future of the past" construction in which the indicated event or situation occurs before a time that occurs after the past time of perspective: In 1982, I knew that by 1986 I would have already gone to prison. This construction is identical to the English conditional perfect construction.

An obsolete term found in old grammars for the English future perfect is the "second future tense."

For more information, see the sections on the future perfect and future perfect progressive in the article on uses of English verb forms.

== Spanish ==
In Spanish, the future perfect is formed as this:

yo {} habré {} hablado
subject + {future of haber} + {past participle}
I {} {will have} {} spoken

The future of haber is formed by the future stem habr + the endings -é, -ás, -á, -emos, -éis, -án. The past participle of a verb is formed by adding the endings -ado and -ido to ar and er/ir verbs, respectively. However, there are a few irregular participles such as these:

abrir: abierto
cubrir: cubierto
decir: dicho
escribir: escrito
freír: frito
hacer: hecho
morir: muerto
poner: puesto
ver: visto
volver: vuelto

Verbs within verbs also have the same participle, for example, predecir ("to predict') would be predicho; suponer ("to suppose") would be supuesto. Also, satisfacer ("to satisfy") is close to hacer ("to do") in that the past participle is satisfecho.

To make the tense negative, no is simply added before the form of haber: yo no habré hablado. For use with reflexive verbs, the reflexive pronoun is before the form of haber: from bañarse ("to take a bath"), yo me habré bañado; negative: yo no me habré bañado.

== Portuguese ==
In Portuguese, the future perfect is formed like in to Spanish:

subject + future of ter or haver + past participle

eu haverei falado ("I will have spoken")
eu terei falado ("I will have spoken")

The future of ter is formed by the future stem ter + the endings -ei, -ás, -á, -emos, -eis, -ão (the 2nd person plural form tereis is, however, archaic). The past participle of a verb is formed in turn by adding the endings -ado and -ido to the stems of -ar and -er/-ir verbs, respectively. However, there are a few irregular participles such as these:

abrir: aberto
cobrir: coberto
dizer: dito
escrever: escrito
fazer: feito
ganhar: ganho
gastar: gasto
pagar: pago
pôr: posto
ver: visto
vir: vindo

Several verbs that are derived from the irregular verbs above form their past participle similarly like the past participle of predizer ("to predict') is predito; for supor ("to suppose"), it would be suposto, and satisfazer ("to satisfy"), which is derived from fazer ("to do"), has the past participle satisfeito.

To make the sentence negative, não is simply added before the conjugated form of ter: eu não terei falado. When using the future perfect with oblique pronouns, European Portuguese and formal written Brazilian Portuguese use mesoclisis of the pronoun in the affirmative form and place the pronoun before the auxiliary verb in the negative form:

Eu tê-lo-ei visto ("I will have seen him")
Eu não o terei visto ("I will not have seen him")

Eles ter-me-ão visto ( "They will have seen me")
Eles não me terão visto ("They will not have seen me")

Informal Brazilian Portuguese usually places stressed pronouns such as me, te, se, nos and lhe/lhes between the conjugated form of ter and the past participle: eles terão me visto; in the negative form, both eles não terão me visto and eles não me terão visto are possible, but the latter is more formal and preferred in the written language.

Unstressed pronouns like o and a are normally placed before the conjugated form of ter: eu o terei visto; eu não o terei visto.

== French ==
The French future perfect, called futur antérieur, is formed like in Spanish:

j' {} aurai {} parlé
subject + {future of avoir or être} + {past participle}
I {} {will have} {} spoken

However, verbs that use être in the past ("House of Être" verbs, reflexive verbs) use être to form the present perfect. For example, je serai venu(e) uses the future of être because of the action verb, venir (to come), which uses être in the past.

To form the future form of the auxiliary verbs, the future stem is used, and the endings -ai, -as, -a, -ons, -ez, -ont are added. Both avoir and être have irregular future stems, but with the exception of -re verbs, most verbs use the infinitive as the future stem (je parler-ai, I will speak), the future stem of avoir "is" aur-, and the future stem of être is ser-.

To form the past participle in French, one usually adds -é, -i, and -u to the roots of -er, -ir, and -re verbs, respectively. However, there are many exceptions to this rule, including these commonly used ones (and all of their related verbs):

- faire: fait
- mettre: mis
- ouvrir: ouvert
- prendre: pris
- venir: venu

Verbs related to mettre ("to put"): promettre ("to promise"); to ouvrir: offrir ("to offer"), souffrir ("to suffer"); to prendre ("to take"): apprendre ("to learn"), comprendre ("to understand"); to venir ("to come"): revenir ("to come again"), devenir ("to become").

When using être as the auxiliary verb, one must make sure that the past participle agrees with the subject: je serai venu ("I [masc.] will have come"), je serai venue ("I [fem.] will have come"); nous serons venus ("We [masc. or mixed] will have come"), nous serons venues ('We [fem.] will have come"). Verbs using avoir do not need agreement.

To make this form negative, one simply adds ne (n' if before a vowel) before the auxiliary verb and pas after it: je n'aurai pas parlé; je ne serai pas venu. For reflexive verbs, one puts the reflexive pronoun before the auxiliary verb: from se baigner ("to take a bath"), je me serai baigné; negative: je ne me serai pas baigné.

== German ==
The future perfect in German (called "Futur II", "Vorzukunft" or "vollendete Zukunft") is formed like it is in English, by taking the simple future of the past infinitive. For that, the simple future of the auxiliary sein (= ich werde sein, du wirst sein etc.) or haben (= ich werde haben, du wirst haben, etc.) is used to enclose the past participle of the relevant verb (ich werde gemacht haben, du wirst gemacht haben, etc.):

- Ich werde etwas geschrieben haben.

"I will have written something."

- Morgen um diese Uhrzeit werden wir bereits die Mathe-Prüfung gehabt haben.

"Tomorrow at the same time we already will have had the math exam."

- Es wird ihm gelungen sein.

"He will have succeeded."

- Wir werden angekommen sein.

"We will have arrived."

== Dutch ==
The Dutch future perfect tense is very similar to the German future perfect tense. It is formed by using the verb zullen ("shall") and then placing the past participle and hebben ("to have") or zijn ("to be") after it:

Ik zal iets geschreven hebben.
"I shall something written have."
"I will have written something."

== Afrikaans ==
The Afrikaans future perfect tense is very similar to the Dutch future perfect tense. It is formed by using the verb sal ("shall") followed by the past participle and het (conjugated form of the verb hê):

Ek sal iets geskryf (*) het.
"I shall something written have."
"I will have written something."

(*) Unlike in Dutch, almost all past participles in Afrikaans are regular (with a few exceptions like gehad and gedag). The Dutch strong participles are, however, sometimes preserved in Afrikaans when the participles are used as adjectives:

Dutch: Ik zal een brief geschreven hebben
Afrikaans: Ek sal 'n brief geskryf het
English: "I will have written a letter"

Dutch: een geschreven brief
Afrikaans: 'n Geskrewe brief
English: "a written letter"

== Catalan ==
In Catalan, the future perfect is formed as this:

jo {} hauré {} parlat
subject + {future of haver} + {past participle}
I {} {will have} {} spoken

The future of haver is formed by the future stem haver + the endings -é, -às, -à, -em, -eu, -an. The past participle of a verb is formed by adding the endings -at, -ut and -it to ar, er, ir verbs, respectively. However, there are a few irregular participles such as these:

caldre: calgut
córrer: corregut
creure: cregut
dir: dit
dur: dut
empènyer: empès
entendre: entès
escriure: escrit
fer: fet
fondre: fos
haver: hagut
imprimir: imprès
morir: mort
obrir: obert
prendre: pres
resoldre: resolt
riure: rigut
treure: tret
valer: valgut
venir: vingut
viure: viscut

To make the tense negative, no is simply added before the form of haver: jo no hauré parlat. For use with reflexive verbs, the reflexive pronoun is before the form of haver: from banyar-se ("to take a bath"), jo m'hauré banyat; negative: jo no m'hauré banyat.

== Greek ==
In Modern Greek, the future perfect is formed with the future particle θα tha, an auxiliary verb (έχω or είμαι écho, íme "to have" or "to be"), and the infinitive or participle.

- "I will have finished by then"
  Θα έχω τελειώσει ... ("have" + infinitive)
  Tha écho teliósi ...
- "I will be hired by then"
  θα είμαι προσληφθείς ... ("be" + participle)
  Tha ime proslipthis

In Ancient Greek, the future perfect of the active voice is most commonly formed periphrastically by combining the future tense of the verb "to be" with the perfect active participle, for example λελυκὼς ἔσομαι "I shall have loosed". In the middle and passive voice, the periphrastic construction is also very common, but a synthetic construction is found as well, by adding the endings of the future tense to the perfect stem, for example λελύσομαι "I shall have been loosed". The synthetic construction is rare, and found only with a few verbs.

== Latin ==
In Latin conjugation, the active future perfect is formed by suffixing the future forms of esse "to be" to the perfect stem of the verb. An exception is the active indicative third person plural, where the suffix is -erint instead of the expected -erunt. E.g. amaverint, not **amaverunt.

The passive future perfect is formed using the passive perfect participle and the future of esse. Note that the participle is inflected like a normal adjective, i.e. it agrees grammatically with the subject.

amāre "to love"
		active future perfect	passive future perfect
1st person	singular	amāverō	amātus -a -um erō
1st person	plural	amāverimus	amātī -ae -a erimus
2nd person	singular	amāveris	amātus -a -um eris
2nd person	plural	amāveritis	amātī -ae -a eritis
3rd person	singular	amāverit	amātus -a -um erit
3rd person	plural	amāverint	amātī -ae -a erunt

== Italian ==
The future perfect is used to say that something will happen in the future but before the time of the main sentence. It is called futuro anteriore and is formed by using the appropriate auxiliary verb "to be" (essere) or "to have" (avere) in the future simple tense followed by the past participle:

Io avrò mangiato ("I will have eaten")
Io sarò andato/a ("I will have gone")

It is also used for to express doubt about the past like the English use of "must have":

Carlo e sua moglie non si parlano più: avranno litigato ("Carlo and his wife are no longer talking: they must have quarrelled")

To translate "By the time/When I have done this, you will have done that", Italian uses the double future: Quando io avrò fatto questo, tu avrai fatto quello.

== Romanian ==
The Romanian viitor anterior is used to refer to an action that will happen (and finish) before another future action. It is formed by the future simple tense of a fi (to be) followed by the participle of the verb.

Eu voi fi ajuns acasă deja la ora 11. ("I will have arrived home already at 11 o'clock.")

== Croatian ==
In Croatian, the future perfect is known as future II (futur drugi) or future exact (futur egzaktni), and is the pre-future verb tense. In modern usage, it appears to denote future action in temporal clauses, but not its sequence relative to the action in the main clause. In conditional, relative, comparative and some other types of clauses it signifies priority and concurrency (a pre-future action that must take place in order for another action to take place), where future I means future subsequence:

- Ako budeš gledao koncert, vidjet ćeš me na pozornici. (If you watch the concert, you'll see me on the stage.)

The tense is formed from the present perfect form of the auxiliary verb to be (I: budem You: budeš He/She:bude We:budemo You:budete They:budu), and the so-called active verbal adjective. Modern grammars seem to agree that the future perfect is mostly formed from imperfective verbs, whereas its use from perfective verbs is replaceable by the present tense.

In the Kajkavian dialect, future perfect verbal forms are used instead of the nonexistent future tense forms of the standard Croatian language.

== Serbian ==
It is usually restricted to conditional clauses. It is formed from a conjugated form of auxiliary verb biti ("to be") in the imperfective aspect plus past participle, which can be in any aspect and is conjugated for gender and number. Since Serbo-Croatian has a developed aspect system this tense is considered redundant.

Kad budem pojeo... ("When I will have eaten...")
Nakon što budeš gotov... ("After you will have been done...")

== See also ==
- Grammatical aspect
- Grammatical tense
- Perfect (grammar)
  - Present perfect
  - Pluperfect
