= Pseudogapping =

Ellipsis omitting most of a verb phrase

Pseudogapping is an ellipsis mechanism that elides most but not all of a non-finite verb phrase; at least one part of the verb phrase remains, which is called the remnant. Pseudogapping occurs in comparative and contrastive contexts, so it appears often after subordinators and coordinators such as if, although, but, than, etc. It is similar to verb phrase ellipsis (VP-ellipsis) insofar as the ellipsis is introduced by an auxiliary verb, and many grammarians take it to be a particular type of VP-ellipsis. The distribution of pseudogapping is more restricted than that of VP-ellipsis, however, and in this regard, it has some traits in common with gapping. But unlike gapping (but like VP-ellipsis), pseudogapping occurs in English but not in closely related languages. The analysis of pseudogapping can vary greatly depending in part on whether the analysis is based in a phrase structure grammar or a dependency grammar. Pseudogapping was first identified, named, and explored by Stump (1977) and has since been studied in detail by Levin (1986) among others, and now enjoys a firm position in the canon of acknowledged ellipsis mechanisms of English.

== Basic examples ==
The following sentences are basic examples of VP-ellipsis and pseudogapping. Each pair draws attention to the similarities and differences across the two closely related ellipsis mechanisms. A smaller font and subscripts are used to mark the elided material, and the antecedent to the ellipsis is bolded:

He drinks milk more often than she does _{drink milk}. - VP-ellipsis
He drinks milk more often than he does _{drink} water. - Pseudogapping

She is working today, but he isn't _{working today}. - VP-ellipsis
She is working today, and he is _{working} tomorrow. - Pseudogapping

Larry might read the short story, but I won't _{read the short story}. - VP-ellipsis
Larry might read the short story, but he won't _{read} the play. - Pseudogapping

The examples show that like VP-ellipsis, the ellipsis of pseudogapping is introduced by an auxiliary verb (be, can, could, have, may, might, should, will, would, etc.). The expression to the immediate right of the "pseudogap" is the remnant (water, tomorrow, the play). As with the remnants of gapping, the remnant of pseudogapping must stand in contrast to the parallel expression in the antecedent clause, e.g. water must stand in contrast to milk in the first example. If it does not, the attempt at pseudogapping fails, e.g.

*He drinks milk more often than she does _{drink} milk. - Failed pseudogapping
*She is working today, and he is _{working} today also. - Failed pseudogapping
*Larry might read the short story, but she won't _{read} the short story. - Failed pseudogapping

As the asterisk * indicates, these sentences are ungrammatical due to the failed attempts at pseudogapping which occur because the remnant does not stand in contrast to the parallel expression in the antecedent clause.

== Further examples ==
The elided material of pseudogapping need not be continuous. In other words, there can be two gaps, e.g.

She asks you to help more often than she does _{ask} me _{to help}. - Pseudogapping with discontinuous gap
The teachers will require the boys to read, but they won't _{require} the girls _{to read}. - Pseudogapping with discontinuous gap
The boss will assign you to work on Tuesday more readily than he will _{assign} me _{to work} on Wednesday. - Pseudogapping with discontinuous gap

The last of these three examples is of particular interest, since it shows that pseudogapping can leave two remnants, instead of just one.

The examples so far illustrate that pseudogapping is like gapping insofar as the remnants of both ellipsis mechanisms must stand in contrast to the parallel expressions in the antecedent clauses. Another aspect that aligns pseudogapping with gapping is that it must operate forwards; it cannot operate backwards, that is, the gap must follow its filler (= antecedent). This aspect of pseudogapping is unlike VP-ellipsis, which can operate both forwards and backwards, e.g.

Although he won't _{consider your proposal}, she will consider your proposal. - VP-ellipsis operating backward
*Although he won't _{consider} mine, he will consider your proposal. - Failed attempt at backward pseudogapping
He will consider your proposal, although he won't _{consider} mine. - Successful forward pseudogapping

Although Susan does _{praise the cat}, Fred never praises the cat. - VP-ellipsis operating backward
*Although he never does _{praise} the cat, Fred always praises the dog. - Failed attempt at backward pseudogapping
Fred always praises the dog, although he never does _{praise} the cat. - Successful forward pseudogapping

== Theoretical analyses ==
Like many ellipsis mechanisms, pseudogapping challenges theories of syntax. One major difficulty concerns the syntactic status of the elided material. Under normal circumstances, this material often does not qualify as a constituent. Phrase structure grammars that posit the constituent as the fundamental unit of syntax must therefore seek some means of accounting for the fact that the elided material (= the pseudogapped material) does not appear to be a constituent. One widespread account of the phenomenon is to assume movement followed by ellipsis. The remnant is moved out of the encompassing constituent, so that the encompassing constituent can then be elided. The following trees are representative of the movement plus ellipsis approach (the details will vary); they illustrate the second part of the sentence Phil tried to help you, but he didn't me:

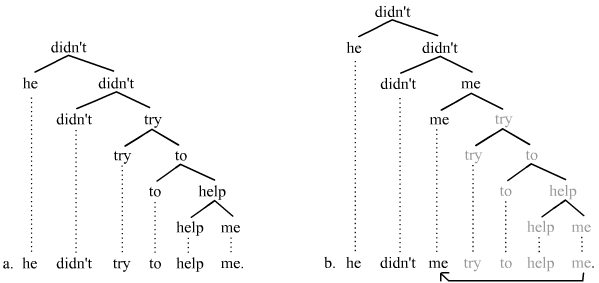

A BPS-style (bare phrase structure) tree convention is employed here insofar as the words themselves are used to label the nodes in the tree. The tree on the left illustrates the underlying structure before movement and ellipsis, and the tree on the right shows the actual surface material. The object pronoun me is moved leftward out of the encompassing constituent try to help me, so that this constituent can then be elided - ellipsis here is indicated using the lighter font. Assuming movement first and ellipsis second in this manner, a constituent-based analysis of pseudogapping (and other ellipsis mechanisms) is possible, since the elided material can be viewed as a constituent after all.

== See also ==
- Catena (linguistics)
- Constituent (linguistics)
- Dependency grammar
- Ellipsis (linguistics)
- Gapping
- Phrase structure grammar
- Verb phrase
- Verb phrase ellipsis
