= Periphrasis =

Usage of function words instead of affixes

In linguistics, periphrasis (/pəˈrɪfrəsɪs/) is the use of more than one word to express meaning that otherwise may be expressed by attaching an affix or clitic to a word. The resulting phrase includes two or more collocated words instead of one inflected word. The comparison may be within a language or between languages. For example, "more happy" is periphrastic in comparison to "happier", and English "I will eat" is periphrastic in comparison to Spanish comeré.

The term originates from the Greek word περιφράζομαι periphrazomai 'talking around', and was originally used for examples that came up in ancient Greek. In epic poetry, it was common to use periphrasis in examples such as "the sons of the Achaeans" (meaning the Achaeans), or "How did such words escape the fence of your teeth?" (adding a layer of poetic imagery to "your teeth"). Sometimes periphrastic forms were used for verbs that would otherwise be unpronounceable. For example, the Greek verb δείκνυμι, deiknumi, 'to show', has a hypothetical form *δεδείκνται, dedeikntai, which has the disallowed consonant cluster -knt-, so one would instead say δεδειγμένοι εἰσί, dedeigmenoi eisi, using a periphrasis with a participle.

Periphrastic forms are a characteristic of analytic languages, whereas the absence of periphrasis is a characteristic of synthetic languages. While periphrasis concerns all categories of syntax, it is most visible with verb catena. The verb catenae of English (verb phrases constructed with auxiliary verbs) are highly periphrastic.

== Examples ==
The distinction between inflected and periphrastic forms is usually illustrated across distinct languages. However, comparative and superlative forms of adjectives (and adverbs) in English provide a straightforward illustration of the phenomenon. For many speakers, both the simple and periphrastic forms in the following table are possible:

Inflected form of the comparative (-er)	Periphrastic equivalent
loveli-er	more lovely
friendli-er	more friendly
happi-er	more happy
Inflected form of the superlative (-est)	Periphrastic equivalent
loveli-est	most lovely
friendli-est	most friendly
happi-est	most happy

The periphrastic forms are periphrastic by virtue of the appearance of more or most, and they therefore contain two words instead of just one. The words more and most contribute functional meaning only, just like the inflectional affixes -er and -est.

== Across languages ==
=== English vs. Latin ===
Such distinctions occur in many languages. The following table provides some examples across Latin and English:

Latin (inflected)	English (periphrastic)
stēll-ae	of a star
patient-issimus	most patient
amā-be-ris	(you) will be loved

Periphrasis is a characteristic of analytic languages, which tend to avoid inflection. Even strongly inflected synthetic languages sometimes make use of periphrasis to fill out an inflectional paradigm that is missing certain forms. A comparison of some Latin forms of the verb dūcere 'lead' with their English translations illustrates further that English uses periphrasis in many instances where Latin uses inflection.

Latin	English equivalent	grammatical classification
dūc-ē-bāmur	(we) were led	1st person plural imperfect passive indicative
dūc-i-mur	(we) are led	1st person plural present passive indicative
dūc-ē-mur	(we) will be led	1st person plural future passive indicative

English often needs two or three verbs to express the same meaning that Latin expresses with a single verb. Latin is a relatively synthetic language; it expresses grammatical meaning using inflection, whereas the verb system of English, a Germanic language, is relatively analytic; it uses auxiliary verbs to express functional meaning.

=== Israeli Hebrew ===
Unlike Biblical Hebrew, Israeli Hebrew uses a few periphrastic verbal constructions in specific circumstances, such as slang or military language. Consider the following pairs/triplets, in which the first are a Biblical Hebrew synthetic form and the last are an Israeli Hebrew analytic periphrasis:

צעק → שם צעקה
{tsaák} {} {sam tseaká}
{"shouted"} {} {"shouted" (lit. means "put a shout")}

הביט → נתן מבט AND העיף מבט
{hibít} {} {natán mabát} {} {heíf mabát}
{"looked at"} {} {"looked" (lit. means "gave a look")} {} {"looked" (lit. "flew/threw a look";
cf. the English expressions "cast a glance", "threw a look" and "tossed a glance")}

According to Ghil'ad Zuckermann, the Israeli periphrastic construction (using auxiliary verbs followed by a noun) is employed here for the desire to express swift action, and stems from Yiddish. He compares the Israeli periphrasis to the following Yiddish expressions all meaning "to have a look":

געבן א קוק
{gébņ a kuk}
"to give a look"

טאן א קוק
{ton a kuk}
lit. "to do a look"

כאפן א קוק
{khapņ a kuk}
lit. "to catch a look" (colloquial expression)

Zuckermann emphasizes that the Israeli periphrastic constructions "are not nonce, ad hoc lexical calques of Yiddish. The Israeli system is productive and the lexical realization often differs from that of Yiddish". He provides the following Israeli examples:

הרביץ
hirbíts
"hit, beat; gave", yielded

מהירות → הרביץ מהירות
mehirút {} {hirbíts mehirút}
"speed" {} {"drove very fast"}

ארוחה → הרביץ ארוחה
arukhá {} {hirbíts arukhá}
"meal" {} {"ate a big meal"
cf. English "hit the buffet" "eat a lot at the buffet";
"hit the liquor/bottle" "drink alcohol".}

דפק הופעה
{dafák hofaá}
"dressed smartly" (lit. "hit an appearance")

But while Zuckermann attempted to use these examples to claim that Israeli Hebrew grew similar to European languages, it will be noticed that all of these examples are from the slang and therefore linguistically marked. The normal and daily usage of the verb paradigm in Israeli modern Hebrew is of the synthetic form, as in Biblical Hebrew: צָעַק, הִבִּיט

== Catenae ==
The correspondence in meaning across inflected forms and their periphrastic equivalents within the same language or across different languages leads to a basic question. Individual words are always constituents, but their periphrastic equivalents are often not. Given this mismatch in syntactic form, one can pose the following questions: how should the form-meaning correspondence across periphrastic and non-periphrastic forms be understood?; how does it come to pass that a specific meaning-bearing unit can be a constituent in one case but in another case, it is a combination of words that does not qualify as a constituent? An answer to this question that has recently come to light is expressed in terms of the catena unit, as implied above. The periphrastic word combinations are catenae even when they are not constituents, and individual words are also catenae. The form-meaning correspondence is therefore consistent. A given inflected one-word catena corresponds to a periphrastic multiple-word catena.

The role of catenae for the theory of periphrasis is illustrated with the trees that follow. The first example is across French and English. Future tense/time in French is often constructed with an inflected form, whereas English typically employs a periphrastic form, e.g.

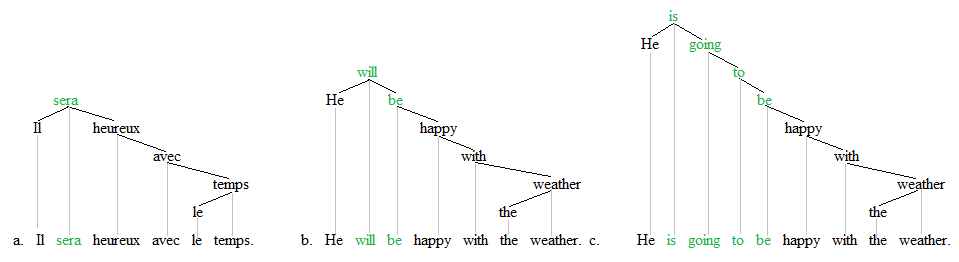

Where French expresses future tense/time using the single (inflected) verb catena sera, English employs a periphrastic two-word catena, or perhaps a periphrastic four-word catena, to express the same basic meaning. The next example is across German and English:

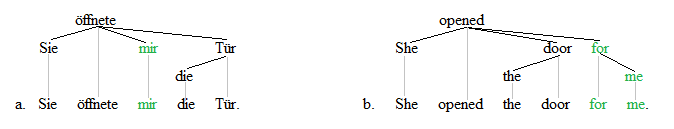

German often indicates an object of a preposition with a single dative case pronoun. For English to express the same meaning, it usually employs the periphrastic two-word prepositional phrase with for. The following trees illustrate the periphrasis of light verb constructions:

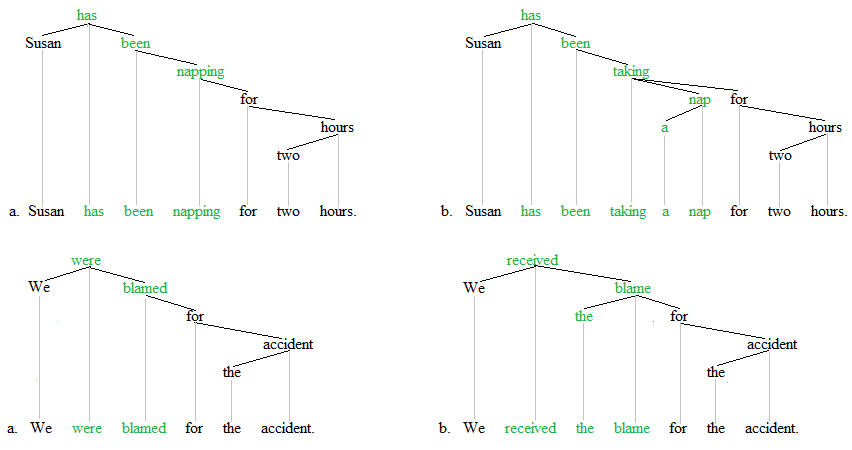

Each time, the catena in green is the matrix predicate. Each of these predicates is a periphrastic form insofar as at least one function word is present. The b-predicates are, however, more periphrastic than the a-predicates since they contain more words. The closely similar meaning of these predicates across the a- and b-variants is accommodated in terms of catenae, since each predicate is a catena.

== See also ==
- Adposition
- Analytic language
- Compound verb
- Deflexion (linguistics)
- Dependency grammar

== General references ==
- Matthews, P. 1981. Syntax. Cambridge, UK: Cambridge University Press.
- Matthews, P. 1991. Morphology, 2nd edition. Cambridge, UK: Cambridge University Press.
- Osborne, T. and T. Groß 2012a. "Constructions are catenae: Construction Grammar meets Dependency Grammar". Cognitive Linguistics 23, 1, 163–214.
- Osborne, T., M. Putnam, and T. Groß 2012b. "Catenae: Introducing a novel unit of syntactic analysis". Syntax 15, 4, 354–396.
- Stump, G. 1998. "Inflection". In A. Spencer and A. M. Zwicky (eds.), The handbook of morphology. Oxford: Blackwell. pp. 13–43.
