= Stripping (linguistics) =

Ellipsis mechanism in coordination

Stripping or bare argument ellipsis is an ellipsis mechanism that elides everything from a clause except one constituent. It occurs exclusively in the non-initial conjuncts of coordinate structures. One prominent analysis of stripping sees it as a particular manifestation of the gapping mechanism, the difference between stripping and gapping lies merely with the number of remnants left behind by ellipsis: gapping leaves two (and sometimes more) constituents behind, whereas stripping leaves just one. Stripping occurs in many languages and is a frequent occurrence in colloquial conversation. As with many other ellipsis mechanisms, stripping challenges theories of syntax in part because the elided material often fails to qualify as a constituent in a straightforward manner.

== Examples ==
The following examples illustrate standard cases of stripping. The elided material is indicated using smaller font size and subscripts.

Susan works at night, and Bill _{works at night} too.
Why did Sam call, and _{why did} Bill _{call} too?
Should I do it, or _{should} you _{do it}?
Chris said yesterday that he knew it, and _{he said} today _{that he knew it} too.
She asked the kids to stay, and _{she asked} the adults _{_{to stay}} too.

Note the appearance of the additive particle too in these examples. Stripping is often marked by also, as well, or too. Notice also the appearance of the coordinator and or or. The coordinator's appearance marks coordination. Each time, the elided material appears in the non-initial conjunct of the coordinate structure. A trait that stripping shares with gapping is illustrated with the following examples:

Should you call me, or _{should} me _{call} you. - Object pronoun of gapping functioning as subject
You are hungry, and me _{am hungry} too. - Object pronoun of stripping functioning as subject

She did it first, and him _{did it} second. - Object pronoun of gapping functioning as subject
She did it, and him _{did it} too. - Object pronoun of stripping functioning as subject

Like gapping, stripping allows the object form of the pronoun (disjunctive pronoun) to function as the subject in the stripped clause. A second trait that stripping shares with gapping is shown with the following examples:

I was helpful this time, and you _{were helpful} last time. - Elided finite verb of gapping does not match antecedent verb.
I was helpful this time, and you _{were helpful this time} too. - Elided finite verb of stripping does not match antecedent verb.

He laughs too much, and you _{laugh} too little. - Elided finite verb of gapping does not match antecedent verb.
He laughs too much, and you _{laugh too much} too. - Elided finite verb of stripping does not match antecedent verb.

Like the gapped verbs, the stripped verbs in these examples do not match their antecedents in the area of verbal inflection. The fact that gapping and stripping are alike in these respects does indeed suggest that they are one and the same ellipsis mechanism.

== Not-stripping ==
A particularly frequent type of stripping is not-stripping. The remnant in the stripped clause is introduced by not and the entire sentence functions to correct a mistaken assumption in the preceding context. More often than not, the coordinator is omitted:

Sam solved the problem, not Bill _{solved the problem}. - not-stripping
She smiled at me first, _{she smiled} not at you _{first}. - not-stripping
Susan gave me some advice, _{Susan gave} not you _{some advice}. - not-stripping with ambiguity
Susan gave me some advice, not you _{gave me some advice}. - not-stripping with ambiguity
He gave it to Smeagol for his birthday, _{he gave it} not to Deagol _{for his birthday}. - not-stripping

A noteworthy aspect of not-stripping is the position of not. In the full versions of these sentences (i.e. without stripping), not cannot appear in the positions shown. When stripping occurs, the not must immediately precede the one remnant. Given this observation, one might conclude that stripping does not really involve ellipsis at all, but rather something else is going on. This conclusion is undermined by further facts. One of these facts is that the behavior of not is the same in cases of not-gapping:

She asked him out, not him _{asked} her _{out}. - not-gapping
Sam should read Susan's paper, not Susan _{should read} Sam's. -not-gapping

These examples of not-gapping suggest two things: that not-stripping, and thus stripping in general, is indeed a particular manifestation of the gapping mechanism and that not-stripping is also indeed ellipsis, since the ellipsis analysis of not-gapping is the only plausible analysis. The aspect of not-stripping that remains mysterious concerns the obligatory position of not before the (first) remnant. One can note in this area that the gapping/stripping mechanism treats the negation in a special way in general. A negation cannot be included in the gapped/stripped material:

*Fred did not ask Susan out, and Susan _{did not ask} Fred _{out}. - Failed attempt to include the negation not in the gapped material
*Fred did not ask Susan out, and Bill _{did not ask Susan out} too. - Failed attempt to include the negation not in the stripped material

== Stripping or not? ==
Like with gapping, delimiting instances of stripping from "normal" instances of coordination, i.e. from instances of coordination that do not involve ellipsis, can be difficult, as the following competing analyses illustrate:

a. Susan watches [Fox news] and [the weather channel]. - Non-stripping analysis
b. [Susan watches Fox news], and [_{she watches} the weather channel too]. - Stripping analysis

a. I like to read [Kafka] and [Schiller]. - Non-stripping analysis
b. [I like to read Kafka], and [_{I like to read} Schiller as well]. - Stripping analysis

a. Fred has stopped [complaining] and [obstructing our efforts]. - Non-stripping analysis
b. [Fred has started complaining], and [_{Fred has started}obstructing our efforts too]. - Stripping analysis

The brackets mark the extent of the coordinate structures. The distinction between the stripping and non-stripping analyses can be slight. Given a single intonation curve, the non-gapping analysis seems better, but if a pause occurs immediately before the coordinator (as marked by the comma) and an additive particle appears (e.g. too, also, as well), then the stripping analysis becomes more plausible.

The distinction between the two analyses explains the ambiguity in the sentence Do you want coffee or tea?:

a. Do you want [coffee] or [tea]? - Non-stripping analysis; answer: Yes/No.
b. [Do you want coffee], or [_{do you want} tea]? - Stripping analysis; answer: Coffee/Tea.

== Theoretical analyses ==
As with most ellipsis mechanisms, theoretical accounts of stripping face significant challenges. The greatest challenge is to come up with a coherent explanation of the stripped material. The insight that the remnant of stripping is always a constituent is straightforward. The difficulties arise when one attempts to discern which individual constituents can and cannot be a remnant. For instance, why are the remnants in the following cases disallowed?:

*Larry has read the text, and _{he has} enjoyed _{it}. - Failed attempt at stripping
*Susan promised to read the page, and _{she promised to} copy _{it}. - Failed attempt at stripping
*An instructor flubbed the problem, and _{a} student _{flubbed the problem} too. - Failed attempt at stripping

The remnants in these examples are constituents in constituency grammars (phrase structure grammars), since every individual word is by definition a constituent in constituency grammars. These words are not, however, constituents in dependency grammars, since they dominate other (elided) material. The constituency vs. dependency distinction is therefore one avenue that one might pursue to locate an explanation of such cases. If one chooses a constituency-based grammar, however, then the explanation might draw attention to the distinction between projection levels (see X-bar theory): the remnant must qualify as a maximal projection (as opposed to an intermediate or minimal projection).

Another avenue to explore for an explanation is to focus on the elided material (as opposed to on the remnant). In most cases, the elided material cannot be characterized as a constituent. It can, however, be characterized as a catena. The following dependency grammar trees illustrate this explanation in terms of catenae. The elided material is indicated with a lighter font shade:

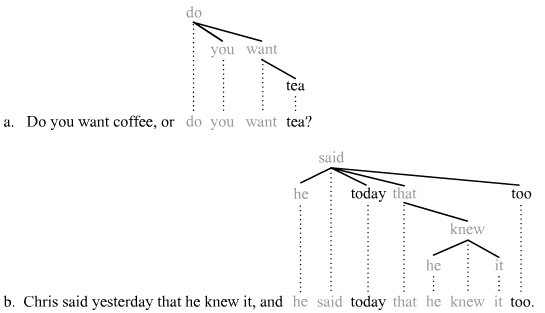

The elided word combinations form chains (catenae), that is, the elided words are linked together by dependencies in the vertical dimension. The word combinations do you want and he said...that he knew it are catenae. These two examples must be compared to the following two:

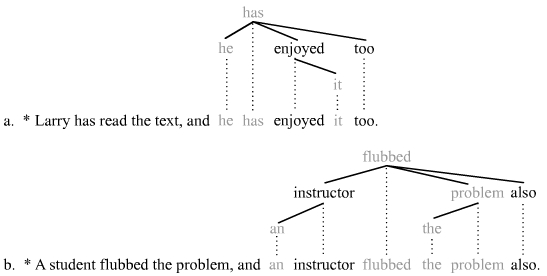

These sentences are bad, and one can explain their badness by acknowledging the status of the elided words as non-catenae; the elided words are not entirely linked together in the vertical dimension. The object pronoun it in the a-tree and the indefinite article an in the b-tree are not linked directly to the other elided material. This observation may explain why these attempts at stripping fail. The elided material should qualify as a catena.

== See also ==
- Catena (linguistics)
- Dependency grammar
- Gapping
- Phrase structure grammar
