= Gapping =

Ellipsis that occurs in some languages

In linguistics, gapping is a type of ellipsis that occurs in the non-initial conjuncts of coordinate structures. Gapping usually omits minimally a finite verb and further any non-finite verbs that are present. This material is "gapped" from the non-initial conjuncts of a coordinate structure. Gapping exists in many languages, but by no means in all of them, and gapping has been studied extensively and is therefore one of the more understood ellipsis mechanisms. Stripping is viewed as a particular manifestation of the gapping mechanism where just one remnant (instead of two or more) appears in the gapped/stripped conjunct.

== Basic examples ==
Canonical examples of gapping have a true "gap", which means the omitted material appears medially in the non-initial conjuncts, with a remnant to its left and a remnant to its right. The omitted material of gapping in all the examples below is indicated with subscripts and a smaller font:

Some ate bread, and others _{ate} rice.
Fred likes to pet the cat, and Sally _{likes to pet} the dog.
Jim has been observed by me, and Tom _{has been observed} by you.

In the first sentence, the second conjunct has the subject others, the object rice, but the verb has been 'gapped', that is, omitted. Gapping can span multiple verbs, as well as nonfinite clause boundaries (as the second and third sentences illustrate), but it cannot apply across a finite clause boundary, as seen in the next sentence:

*Sam said that they spoke German, and Charlene _{said that they spoke} Spanish. (disallowed)

Gapping is also incapable of operating backwards, which means that the antecedent to the gap must precede the gap. Attempts at gapping where the gap precedes its antecedent may sound quite unnatural to listeners, e.g.

*He _{orders} beer, and she orders wine. (disallowed)

== Further examples ==
While the canonical cases of gapping have medial gaps, the gap can also be discontinuous, e.g.

Should I call you, or _{should} you _{call} me?
Will Jimmy greet Jill first, or _{will} Jill _{greet} Jimmy _{first}?
He believes her to know the answer, and she _{believes} him _{to know the answer}.
I expect you to help, and you _{expect} me _{to help}.

Many syntacticians take stripping (= bare argument ellipsis) to be a particular manifestation of gapping where only one remnant appears instead of two or more. If this assumption is correct, then the same ellipsis mechanism is at work in the following cases:

Sam has done the work, and Bill _{has done the work}, too.
Sophie barks at raccoons in the morning, and _{Sophie barks} at squirrels _{in the morning}, too.
Did Frank get married first, or _{did} Larry _{get married first}?

In its manifestation as stripping, the gapping mechanism occurs frequently. Gapping is widely assumed to obligatorily elide a finite verb. However, gapping can also occur when no finite verb is involved, e.g.

With her keen on him, and him _{keen} on her, the party should be fun.
It is impossible for Connor to be nice to Jilian, or Jilian _{to be nice} to Connor.

The gap of gapping cannot, however, cut into a major constituent, e.g.

*I read the story about elves, and you _{read the story} about dwarves.
*Pictures of friends should make you smile, and _{pictures} of enemies _{should make you} frown.

== Theoretical analyses ==
Gapping challenges phrase structure theories of syntax because it is not evident how one might produce a satisfactory analysis of the material that can be gapped. The problem concerns the fact that the elided material often does not qualify as a constituent, as many of the examples above illustrate. Faced with this challenge, one prominent approach is to assume some sort of movement. The remnants are moved out of an encompassing parent constituent so that the parent constituent can then be deleted. In other words, there is an ordering of transformations. First the remnants are moved out of their parent constituent and then that parent constituent is elided. The difficulty with such movement analyses concerns the nature of the movement mechanisms, since the movement mechanism needed to vacate the parent constituent would be unlike the recognized movement mechanisms (fronting, scrambling, extraposition).

An alternative analysis of gapping assumes that the catena is the basic unit of syntactic analysis. The catena is associated with dependency grammars and is defined as any word or any combination of words that is continuous with respect to dominance. The elided material of gapping always qualifies as a catena. This situation is illustrated with the following tree, which shows the dependency structure of a well-known example from Ross 1970:

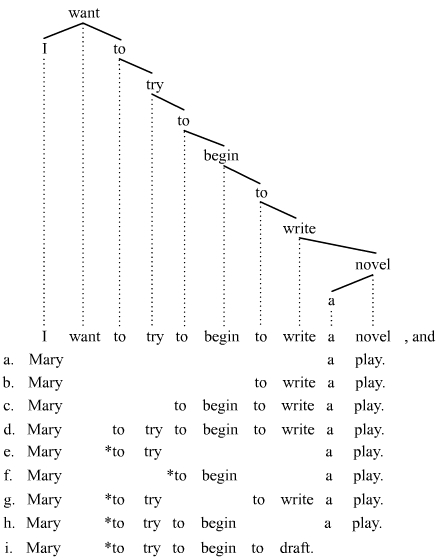

The a-clause is from Ross, whereas the clauses b-i have been added to illustrate the role that the catena plays. The (at least somewhat) acceptable clauses a-d have the elided material corresponding to a catena each time, whereas the clauses e-i are unacceptable each time because the elided material does not correspond to a catena. The star * indicates that the clauses are bad. For instance, the elided material wants...to begin, to the exclusion of to try, is not a catena in (g). The other main forms of ellipsis (e.g. answer fragments, sluicing, VP-ellipsis, etc.) can also all be investigated in terms of the catena. The elided material of most if not all ellipsis mechanisms corresponds to catenae.

== See also ==
- Catena (linguistics)
- Constituent (linguistics)
- Coordination (linguistics)
- Dependency grammar
- Ellipsis (linguistics)
- Phrase structure grammar
- Pseudogapping
- Sluicing
- Verb phrase ellipsis
