= Ellipsis (linguistics) =

Omitted words still understood in context

In linguistics, ellipsis (Ancient Greek: ἔλλειψις, romanized: élleipsis, lit. 'omission'), or elliptical construction, is the omission from a clause of one or more words that are nevertheless understood in the context of the remaining elements. There are numerous distinct types of ellipsis acknowledged in theoretical syntax. Theoretical accounts of ellipsis seek to explain its syntactic and semantic factors, the means by which the elided elements are recovered, and the status of the elided elements.

== Background ==
Varieties of ellipsis have long formed a basis of linguistic theory that addresses basic questions of form–meaning correspondence: in particular, how the usual mechanisms of grasping a meaning from a form may be bypassed or supplanted via elliptical structures. In generative linguistics, the term ellipsis has been applied to a range of syntax in which a perceived interpretation is fuller than that which would be expected based solely on the presence of linguistic forms.

One trait that many types and instances of ellipsis have in common is that the appearance of ellipsis is optional. The occurrence of VP-ellipsis, for instance, is often optional, e.g. He will help, and she will (help), too. Whether or not the second occurrence of the verb help is elided in this sentence is up to the speaker and to communicative aspects of the situational context in which the sentence is uttered. This optionality is a clear indication of ellipsis. At other times, however, ellipsis seems to be obligatory, for instance with cases of comparative deletion, e.g., *More girls were there today than girls were there yesterday. The second occurrence of girls must be omitted in this sentence (More girls were there today than were there yesterday). The obligatory occurrence of ellipsis complicates the analysis, since one can argue that obligatory cases are not really instances of ellipsis at all, but rather a null pro-form is involved. These aspects of the theory should be kept in mind when considering the various types and instances of ellipsis enumerated below.

== Types ==
There are numerous widely acknowledged types of ellipsis. They include:

1. Gapping
2. Stripping
3. Verb phrase ellipsis
4. Pseudogapping
5. Answer ellipsis
6. Sluicing
7. Nominal ellipsis
8. Comparative deletion
9. Null complement anaphora

Among experts, there is no unanimity that all of the abovementioned syntaxes form a natural class in the sense of being derived by one and the same mechanism. Ellipsis-based accounts have been given for other syntaxes, and some of the above have been analyzed in other ways. Most experts would agree, however, that most of the above items are in fact ellipses, so the discussion below takes their status as ellipses largely for granted.

The example sentences below employ the convention whereby the elided material is indicated with subscripts and smaller font size. All examples given below come from English though similar patterns arise cross-linguistically, with variation from language to language.

=== Gapping ===
Gapping occurs in coordinate structures. Redundant material that is present in the immediately preceding clause can be "gapped". This gapped material usually contains a finite verb. Canonical cases have a true "gap" insofar as a remnant appears to the left and to the right of the elided material.

John can play the guitar, and Mary _{can play} the violin.
Fred took a picture of you, and Susan _{took a picture} of me.

While canonical cases have medial gaps as in these two sentences, the gap need not be medial, and it can even be discontinuous, e.g.:

She persuaded him to do the homework, and he _{persuaded} her _{to do the homework}.
Should I call you, or _{should} you _{call} me?

While these two sentences again each have two remnants, the gapped material is no longer continuous. There are in a sense two gaps in each of the gapped clauses. Gapping has been thoroughly studied, and it is therefore reasonably well understood, although the theoretical analyses can vary significantly.

=== Stripping ===
Stripping is also known as bare argument ellipsis. Many linguists take stripping to be a particular manifestation of gapping whereby just one remnant appears in the gapped clause instead of the two (or more) that occur in instances of gapping. The fact that stripping is limited to occurring in coordinate structures is the main reason why stripping is integrated into the analysis of gapping:

John can play the guitar, and Mary _{can play the guitar}, also.
Sam has attempted problem 1, and _{he has attempted} problem 2 as well.

These examples illustrate that stripping is flexible insofar as the remnant in the stripped clause is not limited in function; it can, for instance, be a subject as in the first sentence or an object as in the second sentence.

A particularly frequent type of stripping is not-stripping (stripping in the presence of not), e.g.:

Sam did it, not Fred _{did it}. - not-Stripping
Sally is working on Monday,_{she is} not _{working on} Tuesday.

Not-stripping's status as a form of ellipsis can be debated, since the non-elliptical versions of these sentences are unacceptable, and the key trait of ellipsis is that both the elliptical and non-elliptical versions are acceptable.

=== Verb phrase ellipsis ===
Verb phrase ellipsis (also VP-ellipsis or VPE) is a particularly frequent form of ellipsis in English. VP-ellipsis elides a non-finite VP. The ellipsis must be introduced by an auxiliary verb or by the particle to.

John can play the guitar; Mary can _{play the guitar}, too.
He has done it before, which means he will _{do it} again.

An aspect of VP-ellipsis that is unlike gapping and stripping is that it can occur forwards or backwards. That is, the ellipsis can precede or follow its antecedent, e.g.:

The man who wanted to order the salmon did _{order the salmon}.
The man who wanted to _{order the salmon} did order the salmon.

Of the various ellipsis mechanisms, VP-ellipsis has probably been studied the most and is therefore relatively well-understood.

=== Pseudogapping ===
Many linguists take pseudogapping to be a particular manifestation of VP-ellipsis (rather than a variation on gapping). Like VP-ellipsis, pseudogapping is introduced by an auxiliary verb. Pseudogapping differs from VP-ellipsis, however, insofar as the elided VP is not entirely gone, but rather one (or more) remnants of the VP appear, giving it the outward appearance of gapping. Pseudogapping occurs frequently in comparative and contrastive contexts:

They have been eating the apples more than they have _{been eating} the oranges.
I will feed the chickens today if you will _{feed the chickens} tomorrow.

Pseudogapping is more restricted in distribution than VP-ellipsis. For instance, it can hardly occur backwards, i.e., the ellipsis can hardly precede its antecedent. Further examples:

Would you want to say that to me, or would I _{want to say that} to you?
They could read this book more easily than they could _{read} that book.

=== Answer ellipsis ===
Answer ellipsis involves question-answer pairs. The question focuses on an unknown piece of information, often using an interrogative word (e.g., who, what, when etc.). The corresponding answer provides the missing information and in so doing, the redundant information that appeared in the question is elided, e.g.:

Q: Who has been hiding the truth? A: Billy _{has been hiding the truth}.
Q: What have you been trying to accomplish? A: _{I have been trying to accomplish} This damn crossword.

The fragment answers in these two sentences are verb arguments (subject and object NPs). The fragment can also correspond to an adjunct, e.g.:

Q: When does the circus start? A: _{The circus starts} Tomorrow.
Q: Why has the campaign been so crazy? A: _{The campaign has been so crazy} Due to the personalities.

Answer ellipsis occurs in most, if not all, languages, and is a very frequent type of ellipsis that is omnipresent in everyday communication between speakers.

=== Sluicing ===
Sluicing usually elides everything from a direct or indirect question except the question word. It is a frequent type of ellipsis that appears to occur in most if not all languages. It can operate both forwards and backwards like VP-ellipsis, but unlike gapping, stripping, answer fragments, and pseudogapping, e.g.:

John can play something, but I don’t know what _{he can play}.
I don't know when _{he will call}, but John will definitely call.

The sluicing illustrated with these two sentences has occurred in indirect questions. Sluicing in direct questions is illustrated with the following two examples:

A: Something unusual happened. B: What _{happened}?
A: He has been working on the problem. B: How long _{has he been working on the problem}?

Sluicing has been studied intensely in the past decade and can be viewed as a relatively well-understood ellipsis mechanism, although the theoretical analysis of certain aspects of sluicing remains controversial.

=== Nominal ellipsis ===
Noun ellipsis (also N-ellipsis, N'-ellipsis, NP-ellipsis, NPE, ellipsis in the DP) occurs when the noun and potentially accompanying modifiers are omitted from a noun phrase. Nominal ellipsis occurs with a limited set of determinatives in English (cardinal and ordinal numbers and possessive determiners), though it is much freer in other languages. The following examples illustrate nominal ellipsis with cardinal and ordinal numbers:

Fred did three onerous tasks because Susan had done two _{onerous tasks}.
The first train and the second _{train} have arrived.

The following two sentences illustrate nominal ellipsis with possessive determiners:

I heard Mary's dog, and you heard Bill's _{dog}.
If Doris tries my chili, I will try hers _{(her chili)}.

=== Comparative deletion ===
Comparative deletion occurs in clauses introduced by than in English. The expression that is elided corresponds to a comparative morph such as more or -er in the antecedent clause, e.g.:

More people arrived than we expected _{people would arrive}.
She ordered more beer than we could drink _{beer}.
Doris looks more satisfied than Doreen _{looks} _{satisfied}.
William has friends in more countries than you _{have friends in countries}.

Comparative deletion is different from many of the other optional ellipsis mechanisms insofar as it is obligatory. The non-elliptical versions of these sentences are unacceptable.

The classic Escher sentence "More people have been to Russia than I have" appears to use comparative deletion, but ends up with a meaningless comparison if the apparent elision is included: "More people have been to Russia than I have _{been to Russia}".

=== Null complement anaphora ===
Null complement anaphora elides a complete complement, whereby the elided complement is a finite clause, infinitive phrase, or prepositional phrase. The verbal predicates that can license null complement anaphora form a limited set (e.g., know, approve, refuse, decide). The elided complement cannot be a noun phrase.

Q: Do you know what happened? A: No, I don't know _{what happened}.
Q: Do you approve of the plan? A: No, I don't approve _{of the plan}.
They told Bill to help, but he refused _{to help}.
They offered two ways to spend the day, but I couldn't decide _{between them}.

Of the various ellipsis mechanisms, null complement anaphora is the least studied. In this regard, its status as ellipsis is a point of debate, since its behavior is not consistent with the behavior of many of the other ellipsis mechanisms.

== Less-studied cases of ellipsis ==
Morphologically transparent languages such as Japanese and Uzbek permit utterances that are not syntactic constituents. An Uzbek speaker may respond to U ketyaptimi? 'Is s/he leaving?' with -moqchi 's/he intends to'. Note that -moqchi is a bound suffix, yet here it constitutes a complete utterance. Few attempts have been made to account for the production of such non-sentential utterances.

Further instances of ellipsis that do not (in a clear way) qualify as any of the ellipsis types listed above:

A: The cat likes Bill. B: Why _{does the cat [particularly] like} Bill?
What _{will happen} if I miss the deadline?

More work on ellipsis may need to be done before all ellipsis mechanisms are fully explained.

== Theoretical approaches ==
Ellipsis is widely studied in theoretical literature, with studies focusing especially on the mental representation of elided material, the conditions which license ellipsis, and the means by which the elided material is recovered. One challenge to theoretical accounts of ellipsis comes from cases where the elided material does not appear to be a constituent. Since syntactic operations can only target constituents in standard phrase-structural approaches, accounts within these frameworks must posit additional movement operations to explain such cases. These movement rules raise non-elided material out of a constituent, allowing ellipsis to apply only to the material that is left, thus creating the illusion of ellipsis applying to a non-constituent. Some alternative analyses assume more flexible conceptions of syntactic units such as the catena, thus allowing ellipsis to directly target non-constituents without the need for additional movement rules.

== See also ==
- Anaphora (linguistics)
- Anapodoton
- Aposiopesis
- Question under discussion
- Right node raising
- Squiggle operator
- Whiz deletion
- Zeugma and syllepsis

== Bibliography ==
- Ágel, Vilmos, Ludwig Eichinger, Hans-Werner Eroms, Peter Hellwig, Hans Jürgen Heringer, and Henning Lobin (eds.) 2003/6. Dependency and Valency: An international handbook of contemporary research. Berlin: Walter de Gruyter.
- Ido, Shinji (2009). "A Morpheme-based Model of Nonsentential Utterance Production". Oslo Studies in Language. 1 (1). doi:10.5617/osla.6. hdl:2237/19928. ISSN 1890-9639.
- Ido, Shinji (2010). "A note on fragmentary utterances". The Bulletin of Aichi University of the Arts (in Japanese). 40: 185–195.
- Johnson, Kyle 2001. What VP ellipsis can do, and what it can't, but not why. In The handbook of contemporary syntactic theory, ed. Mark Baltin and Chris Collins, 439–479. Oxford: Blackwell Publishers.
- Lappin, Shalom 1996. The interpretation of ellipsis. In The handbook of contemporary semantic theory, ed. Shalom Lappin. Oxford: Blackwell.
- Lobeck, Anne. 1995. Ellipsis: Functional heads, licensing, and identification. New York: Oxford University Press.
- Lobeck, Anne. 2006. Ellipsis in DP. In The Blackwell Companion to Syntax, ed. by Martin Everaert et al., vol. 2, pp. 145–173. Oxford: Blackwell.
- Merchant, Jason. 2001. The syntax of silence: Sluicing, islands, and the theory of ellipsis. Oxford: Oxford University Press.
- Osborne, Timothy and Thomas Groß 2012. Constructions are catenae: Construction Grammar meets Dependency Grammar. Cognitive Linguistics 23, 1: 163–214.
- Sag, Ivan 1976. Deletion and logical form. Doctoral Dissertation, Massachusetts Institute of Technology, Cambridge, Massachusetts.
