= Whiz deletion =

Type of ellipsis common in English

In linguistics, whiz deletion is a form of ellipsis common in the English language in which a relative pronoun and a form of the verb “to be” are both deleted.

== Examples ==
- Mark Twain, ~~who is~~ generally considered the greatest American humorist, was from Hannibal Missouri.
- The Crystal Palace, ~~which had been~~ built to house London's Great Exposition of 1851, was destroyed by fire in 1936.
- Whiz deletion is a form of ellipsis ~~that is~~ common in the English language.

== Etymology ==
The term “whiz deletion” is a pun made out of a portmanteau stemming from the fact that several of the relative pronouns in English start with “wh-“ and from the is form of “to be.”

== Significance in transformational grammar ==
Whiz deletion is analyzed by Langendoen as a transformational reduction of relative clauses that—together with another transformation, which moves adjectives in front of the noun phrases they modify—explains many occurrences of attributive adjectives. On this analysis, for example, whiz deletion transforms the sentence

1. Wiring that is faulty causes many fires.

into

2. *Wiring faulty causes many fires.

And then the fact that the deletion left behind a bare adjective (namely, faulty) triggers the adjective-preposing transformation, which produces the final (surface) form

3. Faulty wiring causes many fires.

== Criticisms ==
The notion that the process of whiz deletion is the correct explanation for the surface structures in question has been disputed. Williams argues, for instance, that it fails to address the difference between

4. The firm representing the defendant moved to have the case dismissed.

which whiz deletion would produce from

5. The firm that was [or is] representing the defendant moved to have the case dismissed.

and

6. The landlord owning the building will double the rent.

which would have to come from the non grammatical

7. *The landlord who is owning the building will double the rent.

== See also ==
- wh-word
- Reduced relative clause
