= Verb phrase ellipsis =

Type of grammatical omission

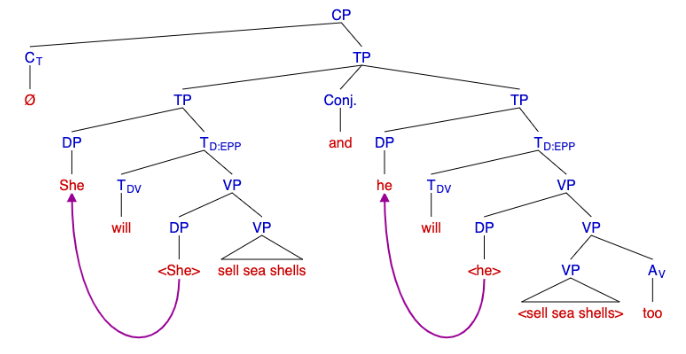
Forward VPE in English.

In linguistics, 'Verb phrase ellipsis' (VP ellipsis or VPE) is a type of grammatical omission where a verb phrase is left out (elided) but its meaning can still be inferred from context. For example, "She will sell sea shells, and he will _{~~<sell sea shells>~~} too" is understood as "She will sell sea shells, and he will sell sea shells too" (tree structure illustrated to the right). VP ellipsis is well-studied, particularly in English, where auxiliary verbs (e.g., will, can, do) play a crucial role in recovering the omitted verb phrase. The reliance on auxiliary verbs gives English a distinctive mechanism for VP ellipsis, making it one of the most researched languages in this area. VP ellipsis can occur partially (e.g. argument ellipsis) or as a whole verb phrase. For instance, Japanese employs a phenomenon known as verb-stranding VP ellipsis, where the verb remains while the rest of the phrase is elided. This cross-linguistic perspective reveals that VP ellipsis is not unique to English, but varies in its structural realization across languages.

== VP Ellipsis in English ==
=== Elided VP Introduction ===
With English grammar, VP ellipsis must be introduced by an auxiliary verb (be, can, do, don't, could, have, may, might, shall, should, will, won't, would, etc.) or by the infinitive particle to. Under VPE, the finite auxiliary and modal verbs cannot be elided. In the examples below, the elided material of VP ellipsis is indicated using subscripts, strikethrough represents that the material has been moved, the antecedent to the ellipsis is bolded, and asterisk (*) signals an ungrammatical sentence:

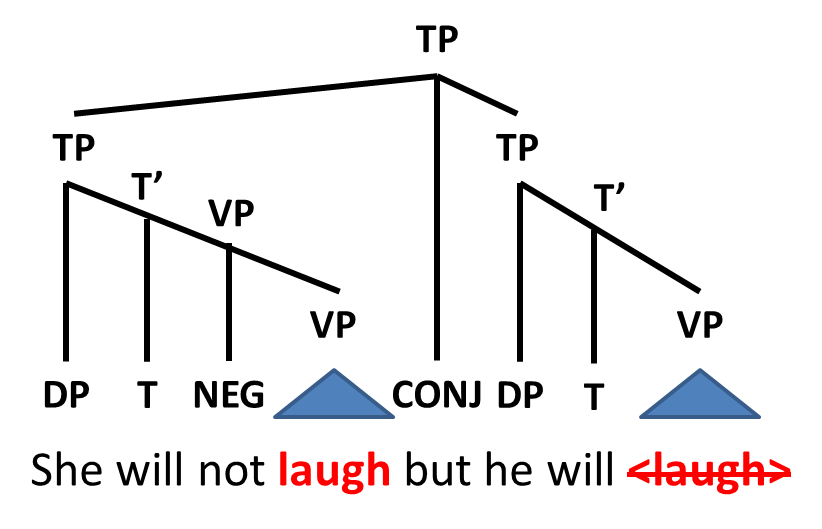
VP ellipsis of the verb "laugh" in English

(1a) You might do it, but I won't _{<~~do it~~>}.
(1b) *You might do it, but I _{<~~do it~~>}.

(2a) She will not laugh, but he will _{<~~laugh~~>}.
(2b) *She will not laugh, but he _{<~~laugh~~>}.

(3a) Susan has been cheating, and Fred has _{<~~been cheating~~>} too.
(3b) *Susan has been cheating, and Fred _{<~~been cheating~~>} too.

(4a) Larry is not telling the truth, neither is Jim _{<~~telling the truth~~>}.
(4b) *Larry is not telling the truth, neither Jim _{<~~telling the truth~~>}.

Attempts at VP ellipsis that lack an auxiliary verb fail, unless the infinitive particle to is retained:

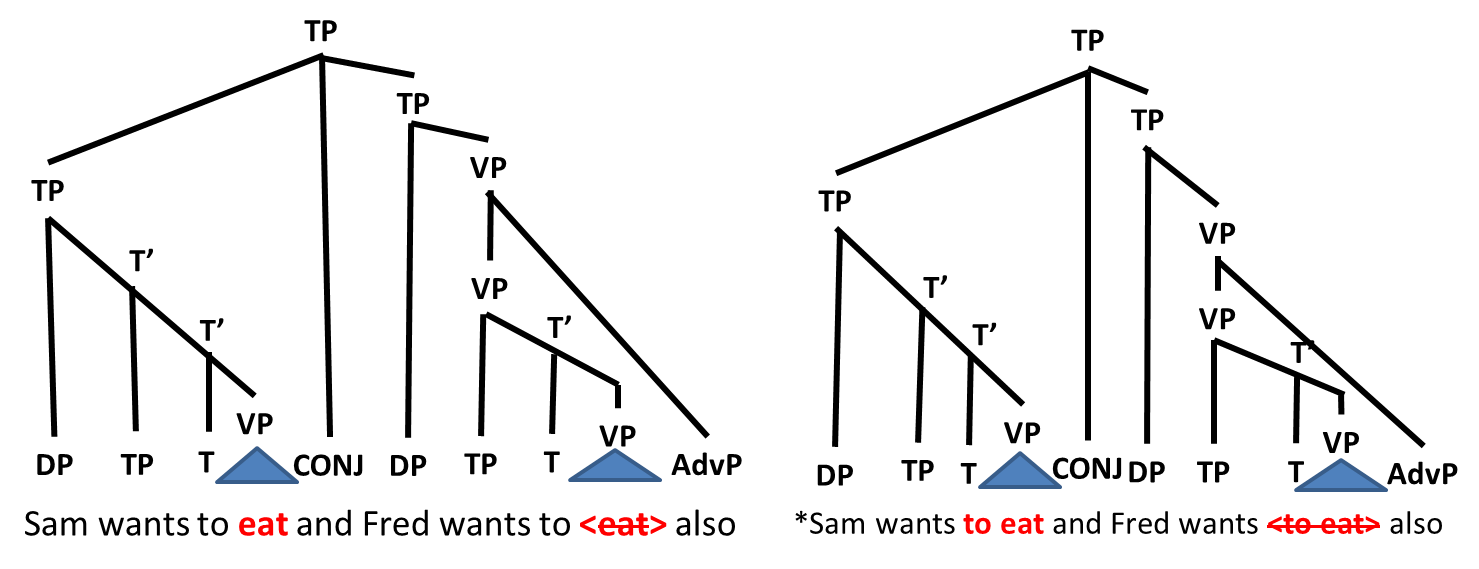
VP ellipsis requiring the infinitive particle "to"

(6a) Sam wants to eat, and Fred wants to _{<~~eat~~>} also.
(6b) *Sam wants to eat, and Fred wants _{<~~to eat~~>} also.

(7a) Josh likes to sleep late, and Hillary likes to _{<~~sleep late~~>} also.
(7b) *Josh likes to sleep late, and Hillary likes _{<~~to sleep late~~>} also.

A particularly frequent construction in which VP ellipsis (obligatorily) occurs is in tag questions:

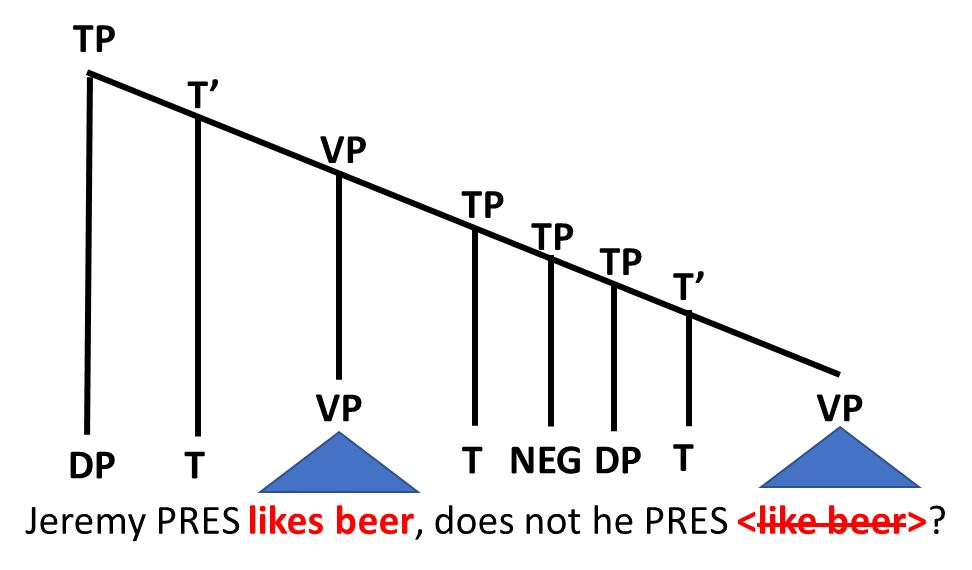
VP ellipsis in a tag question

(8a) Jeremy likes beer, doesn't he _{<~~like beer~~>}?
(8b) Susan will write the paper, won't she _{<~~write the paper~~>}?

Apparent exceptions to the restriction that VP ellipsis can only occur in the context of an auxiliary verb or infinitive particle are analyzed as instances of null complement anaphora:

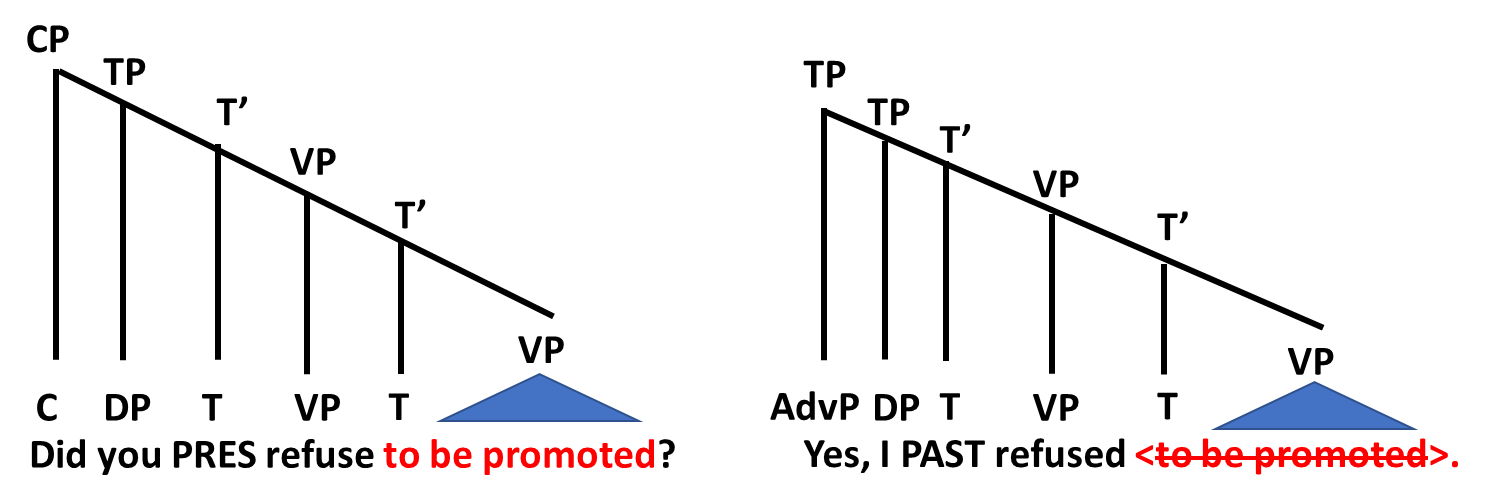
VP ellipsis analyzed as null complement anaphora

(9) Question: Did you refuse to be promoted?
Answer: Yes, I refused _{<~~to be promoted~~>}.

=== Operation Forwards & Backwards ===
VP ellipsis can be said to operate either forwards or backwards: it operates forwards when the antecedent to the ellipsis precedes the ellipsis (as in the above examples) and backwards when the antecedent follows the ellipsis. It can also be said to operate either upwards or downwards (or neither). It operates upwards when the antecedent appears in a clause that is subordinate to the clause containing the ellipsis, and downwards when the ellipsis appears in a clause subordinate to the clause containing the antecedent. In the above examples, the two clauses are coordinated, so neither is subordinate to the other, and hence the operation of the ellipsis is neither upward nor downward.

Combinations of these directions of operation of ellipsis are illustrated with the following examples. In these examples, the subordinate clause who say they will help is a relative clause that modifies the noun people. This relative clause is extraposed out of the subject in examples (11a) and (11b) in order to illustrate the remaining combinations:

(10a) The people who say they will help never do _{~~<help>~~.} _{- Forwards and upwards}
(10b) The people who say they will _{~~<help>~~} never do help. _{- Backwards and downwards}

(11a) The people never do help who say they will _{~~<help>~~}. _{- Forwards and downwards}
(11b) *The people never do _{~~<help>~~} who say they will help. _{- Backwards and upwards}

Three of the four combinations are acceptable. However, as the fourth example shows, VP ellipsis is impossible when it operates both backwards and upwards.

=== Antecedent-contained Ellipsis ===
An aspect of VP ellipsis that has been the subject of much theoretical analysis occurs when elided VP appears to be contained inside its antecedent. The phenomenon is called antecedent-contained ellipsis or antecedent-contained deletion (ACD). This is displayed in both examples below where the antecedent is represented by bolded font. Canonical cases of antecedent-contained ellipsis occur when the elided material appears inside a quantified object NP. This can be seen in the second example where the quantified object NP is underlined. Quantifiers (ex. every) attach to nouns (ex. thing) to specify a subgroup. The elided material is represented in the same format as previous examples.

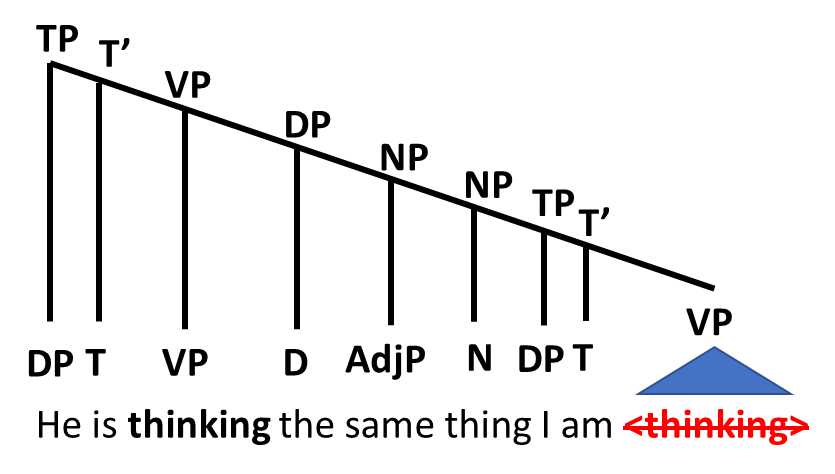
Antecedent-contained deletion (ACD)

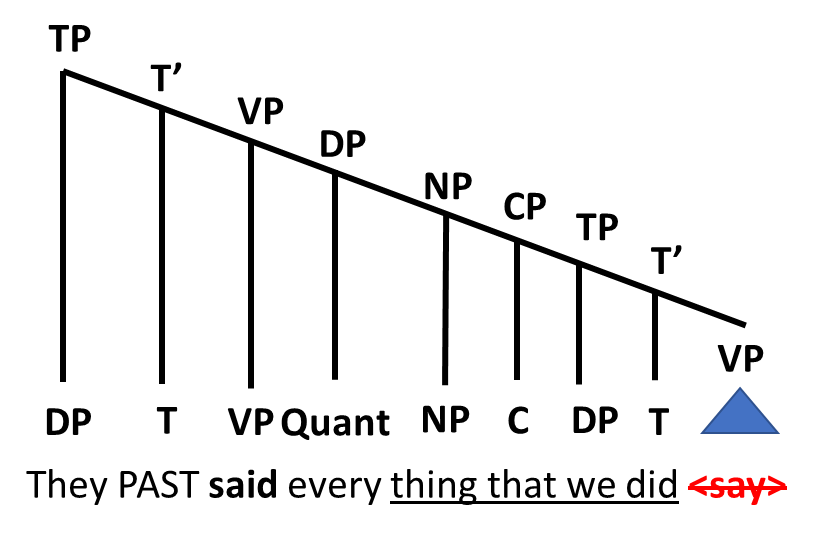
Antecedent-contained deletion (ACD) with quantified object NP

(12) He is thinking the same thing I am _{~~<thinking>~~}.

(13) They said every thing that we did _{~~<say>~~}.

ACD unfortunately gives rise to 2 issues. The first is that the elided VP must be parallel, or identical, in form with the antecedent. The second is that since the antecedent contains the VPE site, whenever the antecedent is copied in, the VPE is automatically also included. Combined, these two factors result in an infinite regress:

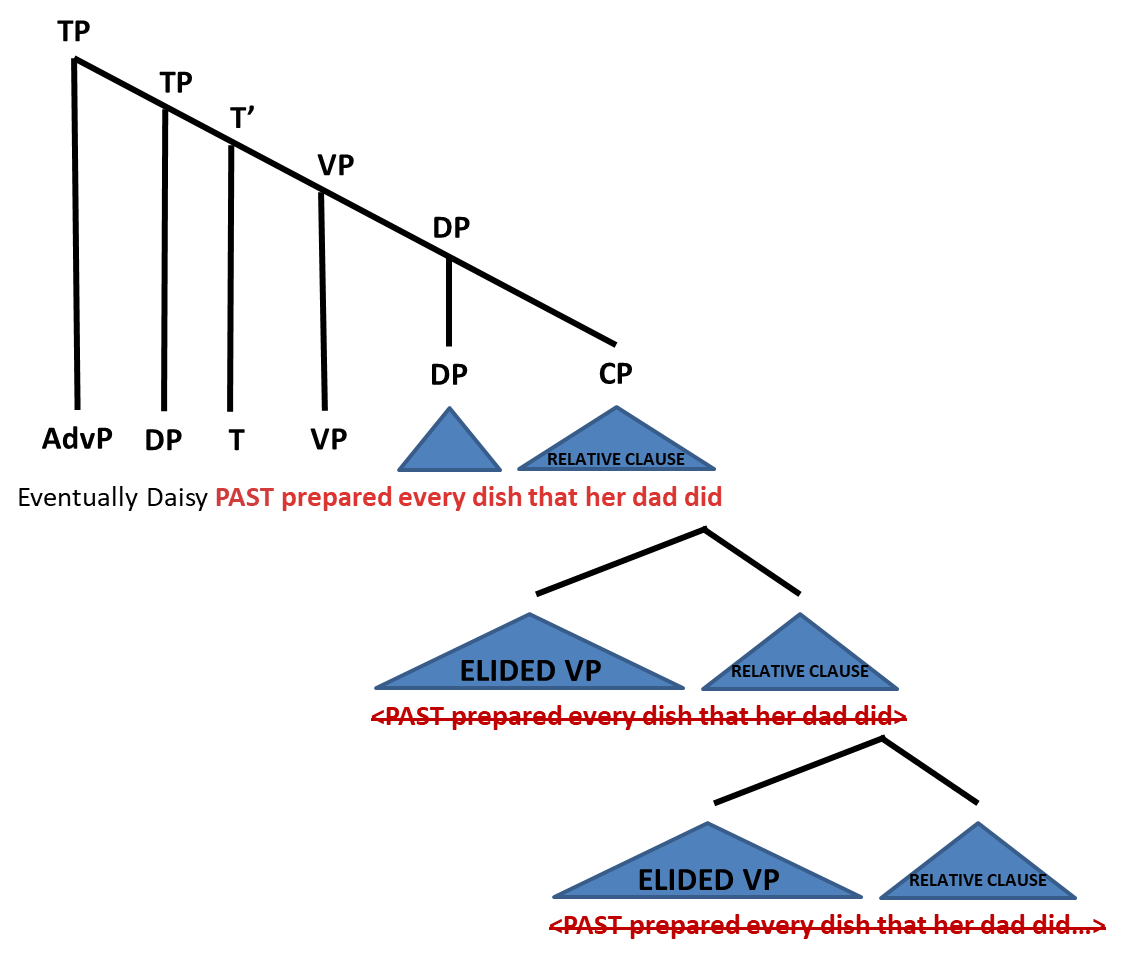
ACD giving rise to infinite regress

(14) Eventually, Daisy [_{VP} knew how to prepare every dish that her dad did [_{~~<know how to prepare every dish that her dad did>~~} [_{~~<know how to prepare every dish that her dad did>~~}...]]]

One means of addressing ACD infinite regress that is pursued in some phrase structure grammars is to assume quantifier raising (QR). Quantifier raising involves moving a quantifier to a higher position in the structure, leaving behind a trace which it binds to. Crucially, the landing site of QR in ACD sentences must be below the subject position. It is seen as a covert process because it leaves the spoken word order unchanged. An alternative explanation, pursued in dependency grammars, is to assume that the basic unit of syntax is not the constituent, but rather the catena. With this analysis, the antecedent to the ellipsis does not need to be a complete constituent (an entire verb phrase), but can be merely a catena (the verbs say and thinking in the above examples), which need not contain the ellipsis.

=== Argument-contained Ellipsis ===
As noted above, VP ellipsis is generally impossible if it would operate both backwards and upwards. There are also certain other restrictions on the possibility of ellipsis, although a complete theoretical analysis may be lacking. Two examples of environments in which ellipsis fails are now given:

(15) *A proof that God exists does _{~~<exist>~~}. _{- Failed upward ellipsis}

(16) *A proof that God does _{~~<exist>~~} exists. _{- Failed argument-contained ellipsis}

The inability of VP ellipsis to occur in these cases has been explored in terms of so-called argument contained ellipsis. The ellipsis appears inside an argument of the predicate represented by the antecedent to the ellipsis. A satisfactory account of the inability of VP ellipsis to occur in these sentences is lacking.

== VP Ellipsis in Other Languages ==
=== Cross-Linguistic Evidence for VP Ellipsis ===
English VP ellipsis is particularly well-studied, not because it is unique, but due to the language's global research prominence. Its reliance on auxiliary verbs like do, can, and will to license ellipsis gives it a structured mechanism not found in languages like Mandarin, where semantic and pragmatic factors dominate. The flexibility of English allows for greater variation in the licensing and interpretation of VP ellipsis, which may explain its prominence in linguistic studies.

While English VP ellipsis is the most studied, evidence suggests the phenomenon occurs in other languages, though its mechanisms vary. In English, VP ellipsis often relies on auxiliary verbs like can or will and operates under syntactic constraints:

(17) "John will sing, and Mary will too."

=== Argument Ellipsis in Japanese ===
Unlike languages such as English, which rely on true VPE, Japanese does not exhibit verb-stranding VPE. Instead, Japanese typically uses argument ellipsis, where specific elements like objects or subjects are omitted, while the verb remains. This is supported by research arguing against the application of VPE mechanisms in Japanese syntax.

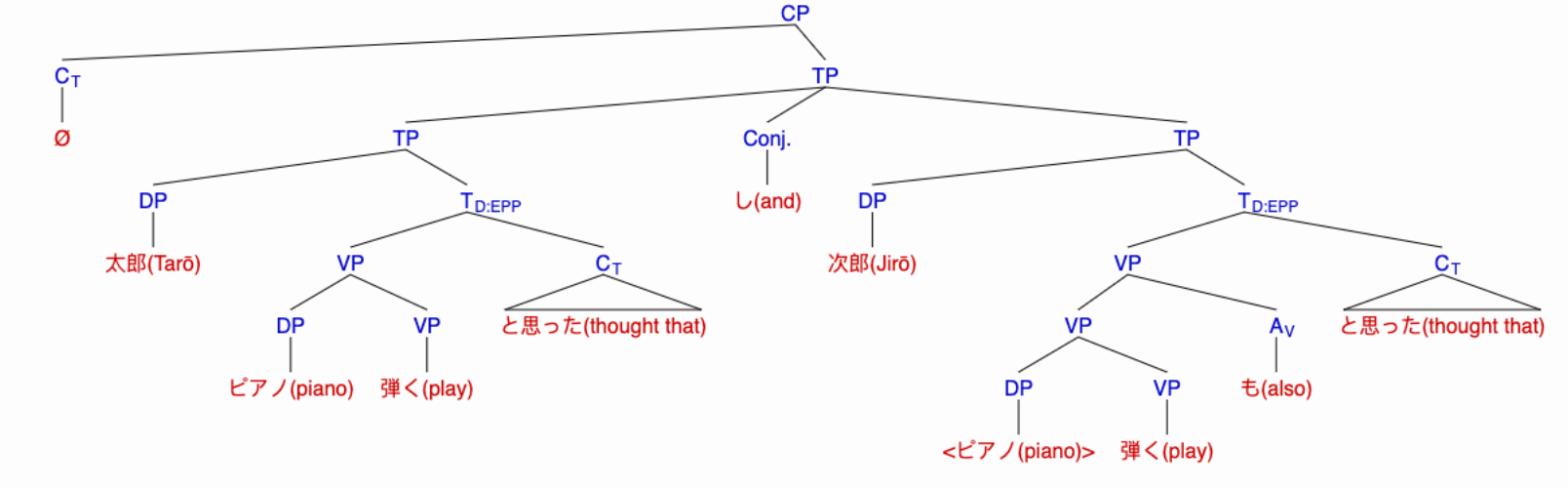
Japanese Argument Ellipsis Example.

(18) 太郎は自分がピアノを弾くと思ったが、次郎もそう思った。

Tarō ga piano o hiku to omotta, Jirō mo hiku to omotta.
"Tarō thought he plays the piano, and Jirō thought so too."

In this example, while the object ピアノ (piano) is omitted, the verb 弾く (play) remains overt. Tanaka (2023) argues that this does not support the existence of verb-stranding VP-ellipsis (VPE) in Japanese. Instead, it is more appropriately analyzed as argument ellipsis, where specific arguments (e.g., objects) are omitted while the verb phrase remains intact.

The strict Subject-Object-Verb (SOV) order in Japanese and the absence of auxiliary verbs to syntactically license ellipsis further challenge the notion of verb-stranding VPE. Tanaka highlights that Japanese instead relies on mechanisms like argument omission and pro-drop to achieve ellipsis-like interpretations

=== VP Ellipsis in Mandarin Chinese ===
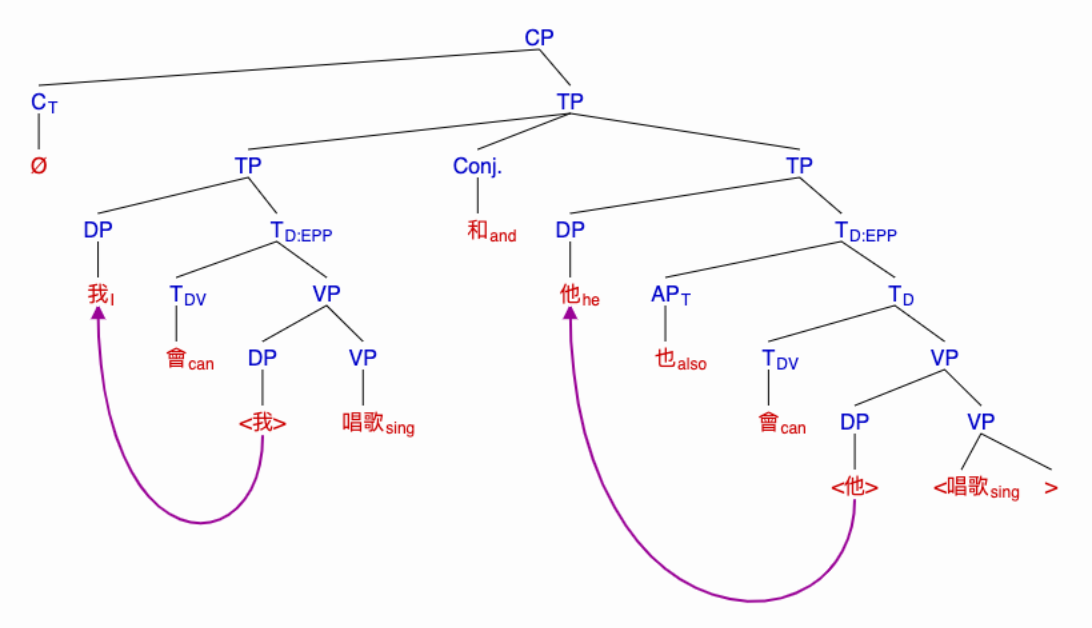
Mandarin Forward VPE Example.

In Mandarin Chinese, VP ellipsis works similar in English that both omits the verb phrase and rely on auxiliary verb. However research suggests that Mandarin speakers tends to interpret VP ellipsis primarily through semantic and pragmatic cues rather than syntactic reconstruction.

(19) 我會唱歌，他也會。

Wǒ huì chànggē, tā yě huì.
"I can sing, and he can too."

Here, the auxiliary verb 會 (huì, "can") appears to license the omission of the verb phrase 唱歌 (chànggē, "sing"). However, Cai et al. (2013) argue that this example does not rely on syntactic ellipsis in the same manner as English. Instead, Mandarin VP ellipsis is interpreted pragmatically, relying on context and semantic cues. The presence of the adverb 也 (yě, "also") explicitly marks agreement or inclusion, providing additional clarity to the omitted content.

Unlike English, Mandarin does not require auxiliary verbs to syntactically license VP ellipsis. Rather, the omission of the verb phrase is contextually resolved, reflecting a greater reliance on discourse coherence and pragmatic inference.

== VP Ellipsis in Language Acquisition ==
Language acquisition often refers to a child learning to speak their first language, which is most often the language of their caregivers. Language acquisition involves many stages of learning—some of which are required before mastery of new information may occur.

Children acquiring VP ellipsis typically go through two stages: in stage one, they use a full sentence; in stage two—after they have mastered intonation and modal auxiliaries—they are able to use VP ellipsis.

=== Pre-mastery ===
Intonation or inflection on the edge of the phrase marks where the elided material has been deleted from the phonological form: until children master where and how to use intonation in a sentence to mark the elided material, they respond in full sentences.

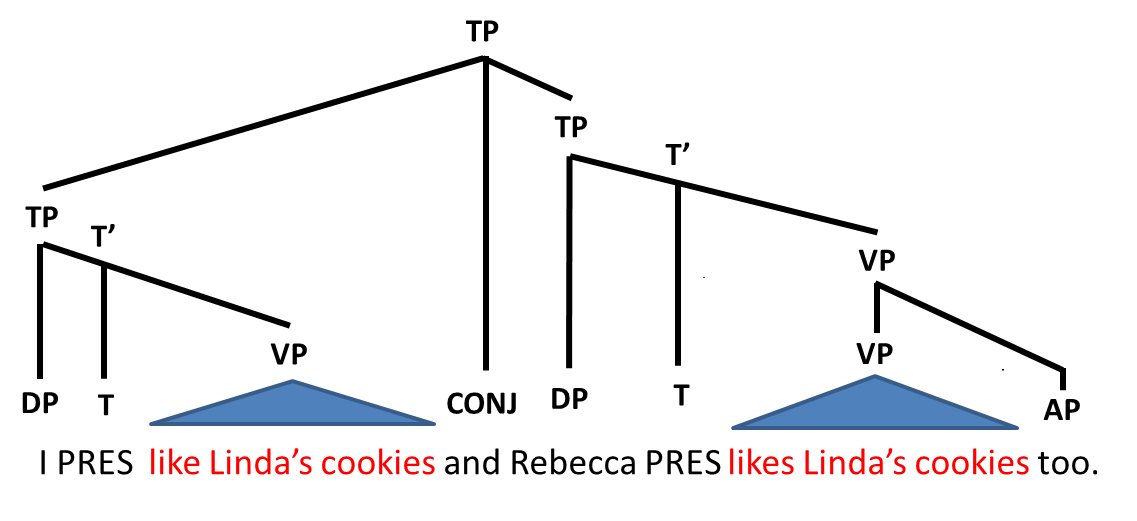
VPE Pre-Mastery Example.

(21) I like Linda's cookies and Rebecca likes Linda's cookies too.

=== Mastery ===
Children master the use of modal auxiliaries before they effectively use verb phrase ellipsis because modal auxiliaries license ellipsis.

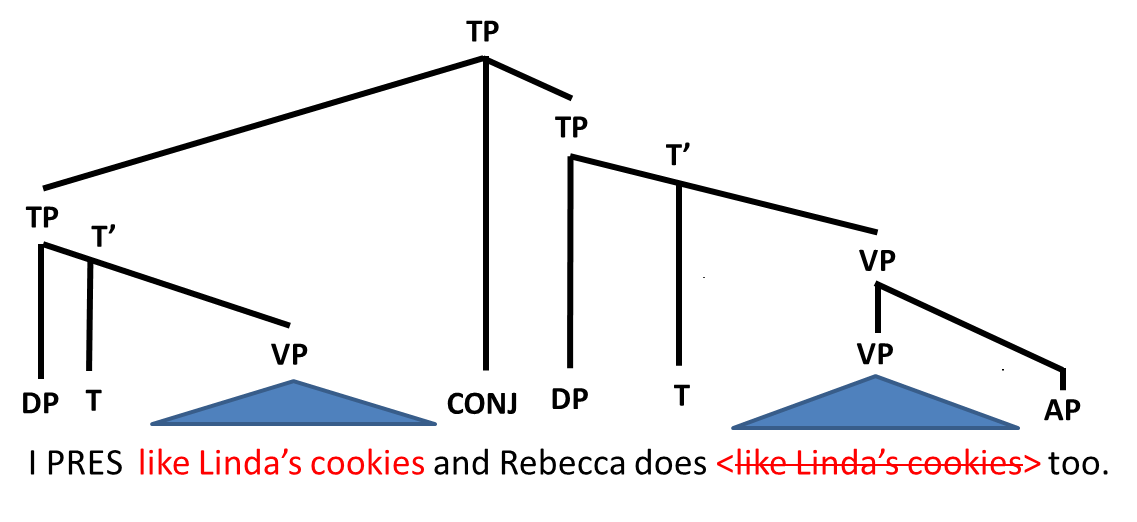
VPE Mastery Example.

(22) I like Linda's cookies, and Rebecca does ~~<like Linda's cookies>~~ too.

The above sentence shows the use of both intonation (bold italicized font) and the modal auxiliary (does)--both of which are required for English verb phrase ellipsis.

Intonation on the modal auxiliary marks the edge of the phrase, from which the elided material has been deleted from the phonological form: that is, although the elided material remains in the logical form, it is not in the phonological form.

Despite using fewer words than a complete sentence, a sentence which employs verb phrase ellipsis requires more steps to be understood. This complexity is due to the processing challenges involved with referring back to the unpronounced syntactic structure.

== VP Ellipsis Importance ==
As seen in the examples above, VP ellipsis can be used to avoid redundancy in language. For example, "I like Linda's cookies, and Rebecca does too" is a much more concise sentence than "I like Linda's cookies, and Rebecca likes Linda's cookies too." VP ellipsis acts as a mechanism of grammatical reduction and contributes to clarity in language. It is related to human cognitive mechanisms such as working memory and is used to reduce cognitive demands placed on the speaker for the speaker as well as language processing difficulty for the listener.

=== Cognitive Load ===
For speakers, VPE is used to lighten the load by reducing the number of words and amount of syntax required in working memory while constructing a sentence. For listeners, retrieval of the elided VP from memory has been found to be cue-dependent and not memory-dependent. The further apart two syntactically related units are, the greater the demand of processing their cognitive load is.

=== VPE As a Diagnostic Tool ===
As VPE is related of cognitive and language development, it can be used diagnosis language and cognitive deficits. If someone is unable to use VPE, this may be the cause of working memory or language retrieval issues. On the other hand, if someone is unable to comprehend sentences with VPE, this may be due to speed and/or cue-processing deficits.

== See also ==
- Catena
- Constituent
- Antecedent-contained deletion
- Dependency grammar
- Ellipsis
- Phrase structure grammar
