= English verbs =

Verbs in the English language

Verbs constitute one of the main parts of speech (word classes) in the English language. Like other types of words in the language, English verbs are not heavily inflected. Most combinations of tense, aspect, mood and voice are expressed periphrastically, using constructions with auxiliary verbs.

Generally, the only inflected forms of an English verb are a third person singular present tense form ending in -s, a past tense (also called preterite), a past participle (which may be the same as the past tense), and a form ending in -ing that serves as a present participle and gerund. Most verbs inflect in a simple regular fashion, although there are about 200 irregular verbs; the irregularity in nearly all cases concerns the past tense and past participle forms. The copula verb be has a larger number of different inflected forms, and is highly irregular.

Although many of the most commonly used verbs in English (and almost all the irregular verbs) come from Old English, many others are taken from Latin or French. Nouns or adjectives can become verbs (see Conversion (word formation)). Adjectives like "separate" and "direct" thus became verbs, starting in the 16th century, and eventually it became standard practice to form verbs from Latin passive participles, even if the adjective didn't exist. Sometimes verbs were formed from Latin roots that were not verbs by adding "-ate" (such as "capacitate"), or from French words (such as "isolate" from French "isoler").

For details of the uses of particular verb tenses and other forms, see the article Uses of English verb forms.

== Inflected forms ==
Conjugation of have
Person	Singular	Plural
First	I have	We have
Second	You have	You have
Third	It has	They have

=== Principal parts ===
A regular English verb has only one principal part, from which all the forms of the verb can be derived. This is the base form or dictionary form. For example, from the base form exist, all the inflected forms of the verb (exist, exists, existed, existing) can be predictably derived. The base form is also called the bare infinitive; that is, the infinitive without the to.

Most irregular verbs have three principal parts, since the past simple and past participle are unpredictable. For example, the verb write has the principal parts write (base form), wrote (past), and written (past participle); the remaining inflected forms (writes, writing) are derived regularly from the base form. Some irregular verbs have identical past tense and past participle forms (as the regular verbs do), as with send–sent–sent.

The infinitive, past simple and past participle are sometimes referred to as First (V1), Second (V2) and Third (V3) form of a verb, respectively. This naming convention has all but disappeared from American and British usage, but still can be found in textbooks and teaching materials used in other countries.

Some speakers have only two forms, collapsing the distinction between V2 and V3, though this is considered non-standard. For most verbs the forms are V1 and V2 (have they went yet?, with 'gone' never being used, or a corporate-ran company rather than corporate-run), but for a few verbs they are V1 and V3 (I seen it, he done it, with 'saw' and 'did' not being used).

The verbs do, say and have additionally have irregular third person singular present tense forms (see below). The copular verb be is highly irregular, with the forms be, am, is, are, was, were, been and being. On the other hand, modal verbs (such as can and must) are defective verbs, being used only in a limited number of forms. For details on the forms of verbs of these types, see § Copular, auxiliary and defective verbs below.

=== Base form ===
The base form or plain form of an English verb is not marked by any inflectional ending.

Certain derivational suffixes are frequently used to form verbs, such as -en (sharpen), -ate (formulate), -fy (electrify), and -ise/ize (realise/realize), but verbs with those suffixes are nonetheless considered to be base-form verbs. Also, many base-form verbs contain prefixes, such un- (unmask), out- (outlast), over- (overtake), and under- (undervalue). Some verbs are formed from nouns and adjectives by conversion, as with the verbs snare, nose, dry, and calm.

The base form is used in the following ways:

- It serves as the bare infinitive, and is used in the to-infinitive (e.g. to write); for uses see § Non-finite forms below.
- It serves as the present simple tense, except in the third person singular: I/you/we/they write regularly (and except for the highly irregular to be).
- It is used as an imperative: Write these words.
- It is used as a subjunctive: I suggested that he write a novel.

For the verb be, which uses different forms for the present simple, and modal verbs, which are not used in the infinitive, imperative or subjunctive, see § Copular, auxiliary and defective verbs below.

=== Third person singular present ===
Almost all verbs have a third person singular present indicative form with the suffix -[e]s. In terms of spelling, it is formed in most cases by adding -s to the verb's base form: run → runs. However if the base form ends in one of the sibilant sounds (/s/, /z/, /ʃ/, /ʒ/, /tʃ/, /dʒ/) and its spelling does not end in a silent e, then -es is added: buzz → buzzes; catch → catches. Verbs ending in a consonant plus o also typically add -es: veto → vetoes. Verbs ending in a consonant plus y add -es after changing the y to an i: cry → cries.

In terms of pronunciation, the ending is pronounced as /ɪz/ after sibilants (as in lurches), as /s/ after voiceless consonants other than sibilants (as in makes), and as /z/ otherwise (as in adds). These are the same rules that apply to the pronunciation of the regular noun plural suffix -[e]s and the possessive -'s. The spelling rules given above are also very similar to those for the plural of nouns.

The third person singular present of have is irregular: has /hæz/ (with the weak form /həz/ when used as an auxiliary, also contractable to -'s). The verbs do and say also have irregular forms, does /dʌz/ and says /sɛz/, which however look like regular forms in writing.

For the verb be, modal verbs and other auxiliaries, see § Copular, auxiliary and defective verbs below.

The form described in this section is used with third person singular subjects as the present simple tense (in the indicative mood): He writes novels all the time. (This tense has other uses besides referring to present time; for example, in I'll be glad if he writes, it refers to future time.)

=== Past tense ===
The past tense, or preterite, may be formed regularly or irregularly.

With regular verbs, the past tense is formed (in terms of spelling) by adding -ed to the base form (play → played). Normal rules for adding suffixes beginning with a vowel apply: If the base form ends in e then only d is added (like → liked); if the base form ends in a consonant followed by y then the y is changed to i before adding the ending (try → tried; an exception is the verb sky (a ball), which can form skied or skyed). Three words ending in -ay (lay, pay and say) change y to i and add -d (laid, paid, said).

Various rules apply for doubling final consonants. If the base form ends in a single vowel followed by a single consonant (except h, silent t, w, x or y), then unless the final syllable is completely unstressed the consonant is doubled before adding the -ed (ship → shipped, but fathom → fathomed). In general this is considered something to keep the vowel before the final consonant short (i.e. if the word were spelled shiped it would have a long i.) However, there are 2 words, control and patrol, which follow this rule even though the vowel before the final consonant is long. For most base forms ending in c, the doubled form used is ck, used regardless of stress (panic → panicked; exceptions include zinc → zincked or zinced, arc → usually arced, spec → specced or spec'ed, sync → sometimes synched). In British English, the doubling of l occurs regardless of stress (travel → travelled; but paralleled is an exception), and when two separately pronounced vowels precede the l (dial → dialled, fuel → fuelled). If the final syllable has some partial stress, especially for compound words, the consonant is usually doubled: backflip → backflipped, hobnob → hobnobbed, kidnap → kidnapped etc. In some cases both alternatives are acceptable, e.g. dialog† → dialogued or dialogged†, hiccup → hiccupped or hiccuped, program → programed† or programmed. However catalog† → cataloged†, pyramid → pyramided, format → formatted (but combat → combat(t)ed). Other variations not entirely consistent with these rules include bus → bused† or bussed, bias → biased or biassed† and focus → focused or focussed. (The forms marked † are not used in British English, and the doubled consonant is not used for many words of non-Anglo-Saxon origin.)

The pronunciation of the past tense ending follows similar rules to those for the third person present tense ending described above: if the base form ends in /t/ or /d/ then a new syllable /ɪd/ or /əd/ is added (as in drifted, exceeded); if the base form ends in an unvoiced consonant sound other than /t/ then the ending is pronounced /t/ (as in capped, passed); otherwise the ending is pronounced /d/ (as in buzzed, tangoed). Consequently, in the 17th and 18th centuries, the latter two pronunciations were routinely spelled -'d, but -ed was later restored.

For the past tense of irregular verbs, see English irregular verbs. Many of these can be classed as Germanic strong verbs, such as sing (past sang), while others are weak verbs with irregularly pronounced or irregularly spelt past forms, such as say (past tense said /sɛd/).

The verb be has two past tense forms: was (first and third person singular) and were (plural and second person).

The past tense (preterite) form is used in what is called the past simple, in sentences such as We lit the fire and He liked to dance. One of the uses of this tense is to refer not to a past situation, but to a hypothetical (present or future) situation in a dependent clause: If I knew that, I wouldn't have to ask. This is sometimes called the "past subjunctive", particularly in the case of were, which can replace was in such sentences; see English subjunctive.

=== Past participle ===
The past participle of regular verbs is identical to the preterite (past tense) form, described in the previous section.

For irregular verbs, see English irregular verbs. Some of these have different past tense and past participle forms (like sing–sang–sung); others have the same form for both (like make–made–made). In some cases the past tense is regular but the past participle is not, as with show–showed–shown.

For uses of the past participle, see § Non-finite forms below.

=== Present participle ===
The present participle form, which is also used for the gerund, is formed by adding the suffix -ing to the base form: go → going. A final silent e is dropped (believe → believing); final ie changes to y (lie → lying), and consonant doubling applies as for the past tense (see above): run → running, panic → panicking.

Exceptions include forms such as singeing, dyeing, ageing, rueing, cacheing and whingeing, where the e may be retained to avoid confusion with otherwise identical words (e.g. singing), to clarify pronunciation (for example to show that a word has a soft g or ch), or for aesthetic reasons.

In standard English the ending is pronounced /ɪŋ/, although in many regional dialects the final consonant sound is pronounced /n/, sometimes represented in eye dialect by spellings such as huntin' (see g-dropping).

For uses of the present participle and gerund, see § Non-finite forms below.

=== Copular, auxiliary and defective verbs ===
The copular verb be has multiple irregular forms in the present tense: am for first person singular (which together with the subject pronoun is often contracted to I'm), is for third person singular (often contracted to 's), and are for plural and second person (often contracted to 're chiefly after the pronouns you, we, they). It also has two past tense forms: was for first and third person singular, and were for plural and second person (also used as a past subjunctive with all persons; see English subjunctive). It has the following negative forms: third person singular present isn't, other present aren't (including first person for the question aren't I), first and third person singular past wasn't, and other past weren't. The past participle is been, and the present participle and gerund is the regular being. The base form be is used regularly as an infinitive, imperative and (present) subjunctive. For archaic forms, see the next section.

English has a number of modal auxiliary verbs which are defective. These verbs mostly have only positive and negative present and past tense forms can/can't/cannot and could/couldn't, may and might/mightn't, shall/shan't and should/shouldn't, will/won't and would/wouldn't, as well as need/needn't. Ought and must are also defective and have only a positive and negative form. In some dialects, dare also has a negative form.

Other verbs used as auxiliaries include have, chiefly in perfect constructions (the forms has /həz/, have and had can contract to 's, 've and 'd); do (does, did) in emphatic, inverted and negated constructions (see do-support).

For more detail of the above, including contractions of negated forms (isn't, won't, etc.), see English auxiliaries and contractions.

Another example of a defective verb is beware, which is used only in those forms in which be remains unchanged, namely the infinitive, subjunctive and imperative.

=== Archaic forms ===
Archaic conjugation of have
Person	Singular	Plural
First	I have	We have
Second	Thou hast	Ye have
Third	It hath	They have

Formerly, particularly in the Old English period, the English language had a far greater degree of verb inflection than it does now (some other Germanic languages retain a greater variety of inflected forms than English does). Some of the forms used in Early Modern English have now fallen out of use, but are still encountered in old writers and texts (e.g. Shakespeare, the King James Bible) and in archaisms.

One such form was the third person singular form with the suffix -eth [əθ], pronounced as a full syllable. This was used in some dialects rather than the modern -s, e.g. he maketh ("he makes"), he runneth ("he runs"), he goeth ("he goes"). In some verbs, a shortened form -th appears: he hath ("he has"), he doth ("he does"; pronounced as if written duth), he saith or he sayeth ("he says"). The forms hath and doth are found in some proverbs ("Hell hath no fury like a woman scorned", "The lady doth protest too much").

Another set of forms are associated with the archaic second person singular pronoun thou, which often have the ending -est, pronounced as a full syllable, e.g. thou makest ("you make"), thou leadest ("you lead"). In some verbs, a shortened form -st appears: thou hast ("you have"), thou dost ("you do"; rhymes with must). In the case of the verb be, such forms included art (present tense), wast (past), wert (past subjunctive) and beest (present subjunctive; pronounced as two syllables). In all other verbs, the past tense is formed by the base past tense form of the word (e.g. had, did, listened) plus-'st, not pronounced as a full syllable, e.g. thou had'st ("you had"), thou did'st ("you did"), thou listened'st ("you listened"). Modal verbs except must also have -t or -st added to their form, e.g. thou canst ("you can"), thou wilt ("you will"), thou wouldst ("you would"), thou mightst ("you might"), except may, which is thou mayest ("you may").

For example, several such forms (as well as other archaic forms such as yea for "yes", thy for "your", and mine enemies for "my enemies") appear in Psalm 23 from the King James Bible:

The LORD is my shepherd; I shall not want.
He maketh me to lie down in green pastures: he leadeth me beside the still waters.
He restoreth my soul: he leadeth me in the paths of righteousness for his name's sake.
Yea, though I walk through the valley of the shadow of death, I will fear no evil: for thou art with me; thy rod and thy staff they comfort me.
Thou preparest a table before me in the presence of mine enemies: thou anointest my head with oil; my cup runneth over.
Surely goodness and mercy shall follow me all the days of my life: and I will dwell in the house of the LORD for ever.

For more information see Old English verbs, English subjunctive, and Indo-European copula (for the history of the verb be).

== Syntactic constructions ==
=== Expressing tenses, aspects and moods ===
Besides the synthetic (inflected) forms described above, there are a number of periphrastic (multi-word) constructions with verb forms that serve to express tensed, aspectual or modal meanings; these constructions are commonly described as representing certain verb tenses or aspects (in English language teaching they are often simply called tenses). For the usage of these forms, see § Use of verb forms below. More detail can be found in the article Uses of English verb forms.

==== Progressive ====
The progressive (or continuous) aspect is expressed with a form of be together with the present participle of the verb. Thus present progressive (present continuous) constructions take forms like am writing, is writing, are writing, while the past progressive (past continuous, also called imperfect) forms are was writing, were writing. There is a progressive infinitive (to) be writing and a progressive subjunctive be writing. Other progressive forms, made with compound forms of be, are described below.

==== Perfect ====
The perfect aspect is expressed with a form of the auxiliary have together with the past participle of the verb. Thus the present perfect is have written or has written, and the past perfect (pluperfect) is had written. The perfect can combine with the progressive aspect (see above) to produce the present perfect progressive (continuous) have/has been writing and the past perfect progressive (continuous) had been writing. There is a perfect infinitive (to) have written and a perfect progressive infinitive (to) have been writing, and corresponding present participle/gerund forms having written and having been writing. A perfect subjunctive (have written) is also sometimes used. Future and conditional perfect forms are given below.

==== Future and conditional ====
What is often called the future tense of English is formed using the auxiliary will. The future simple is will write, the future progressive (continuous) is will be writing, the future perfect is will have written, and the future perfect progressive (continuous) is will have been writing. Traditionally (though now usually in formal English only) shall is used rather than will in the first person singular and plural; see shall and will.

The conditional, or "future-in-the-past", forms are made analogously to these future forms, using would (and should) in place of will (and shall).

==== Imperative ====
In the second person, the imperative mood is normally expressed with the base form of the verb but without a subject: Take this outside! Be good! It is possible to add the second person pronoun you for emphasis: You be good! The first person plural is normally expressed with the contraction let's (let us) and the base form.

More details can be found in the article imperative mood.

=== Expressing passive voice ===
The passive voice in English is normally expressed with a form of the copula verb be (or sometimes get) together with the past participle of the main verb. In this context be is not a stative verb, so it may occur in progressive forms. Examples:

- The house was built last year.
- The house is being built at the moment.
- The house will be built by our firm. (a prepositional phrase with by expresses the performer of the action)
- I was given a blueprint. (here the subject of the passive corresponds to the indirect object of the active)
- He was said to know the house's dimensions. (special construction related to indirect speech)

For details, see English passive voice.

=== Questions, negation, inversion and emphasis ===
Questions are formed by subject–auxiliary inversion (unless the interrogative word is part of the subject). If there is otherwise no auxiliary, the verb do (does, did) is used as an auxiliary, enabling the inversion. This also applies to negation: the negating word not must follow an auxiliary, so do is used if there is no other auxiliary.

Inversion is also required in certain other types of sentences, mainly after negative adverbial phrases; here too do is used if there is no other auxiliary.

The construction with do as auxiliary is also used to enable emphasis to be added to a sentence.

For details of the above constructions, see do-support.

== Use of verb forms ==
This section describes how the verb forms introduced in the preceding sections are used. More detail can be found in the article Uses of English verb forms and in the articles on the individual tenses and aspects.

=== Finite forms ===
In referring to an action taking place regularly (and not limited to the future or to the past), the present simple is used: He brushes his teeth every morning. For an action taking place at the present time, the present progressive construction is used: He is brushing his teeth now. With some verbs expressing a present state, particularly the copula be and verbs expressing a mental state, the present simple is generally used: They are here; I know that. However other state verbs use the present progressive or present simple depending on whether the state is considered temporary or permanent: The pen is lying on the table; Paris lies on the Seine.

For past actions or states, the past simple is generally used: He went out an hour ago; Columbus knew the shape of the world. However, for completed actions for which no past time frame is implied or expressed, the present perfect is normally used: I have made the dinner (i.e. the dinner is now ready). For an action in the course of taking place, or a temporary state existing, at the past time being referred to (compare uses of the present progressive above), the past progressive is used: We were sitting on the beach when... For an action that was completed before the past time being referred to, the past perfect is used: We had sat down on the blanket when...

For actions or events expected to take place in the future, the construction with will can be used: The president will arrive tomorrow. Future events are also often expressed using the be going to construction: She is going to arrive tomorrow. Planned events can also be referred to using the present progressive (She is arriving tomorrow) or, if precisely scheduled, the present simple (She arrives tomorrow). The future progressive and future perfect can be used analogously to the past equivalents: We will be sitting on the beach this afternoon; We will have left the house by 4 o'clock. However, in subordinate clauses expressing a condition or a time reference, present forms are used rather than the forms with will: If/When you get (not will get) there...

When expressing actions or events lasting up to a specified time, the appropriate perfect construction is used (with the progressive if expressing a temporary state that would generally be expressed with a progressive form): We have been having some problems lately; I have lived here for six years; We had been working since the previous evening; We will have been working for twelve hours by the time you arrive.

The use of tense and aspectual forms in condition and conditional clauses follows special patterns; see conditional mood. For use of tenses in indirect speech, see sequence of tenses. For the use of subjunctive forms, see English subjunctive.

=== Non-finite forms ===
The bare infinitive, identical to the base form of the verb, is used as a complement of most modal verbs and certain other verbs (I can write; They made him write; I saw you write), including in negated and inverted sentences formed using do-support (He doesn't write; Did you write?).

Preceded by to, it forms the to-infinitive, which has a variety of uses, including as a noun phrase (To write is to learn) and as the complement of many verbs (I want to write), as well as with certain adjectives and nouns (easy to ride; his decision to leave), and in expressions of purpose (You did it to spite me).

The past participle has the following uses:

- It is used with the auxiliary have in perfect constructions: They have written; We had written before we heard the news. (With verbs of motion, an archaic form with be may be found in older texts: he is come.)
- It is used as a passive participle, with be or get, to form the passive voice: This book was written last year; Trees sometimes get gnawed down by beavers.
- It is used to form passive participial phrases, which can be used adjectivally or adverbially (a letter written on his computer; Beaten to a pulp, he was carried away) and as complements of certain verbs (I got my car mended; They had me placed on a list).
- It may be used as a simple adjective: as a passive participle in the case of transitive verbs (the written word, i.e. "the word that is written"), and as a perfect active participle in the case of some intransitive ones (a fallen tree, i.e. "a tree that has fallen").

The present participle has the following uses:

- It is used with forms of be, in progressive (continuous) constructions: He is writing another book; I intend to be sitting on the beach.
- It can form participial phrases, which can be used adjectivally or adverbially: The man sitting over there is drunk; Being a lawyer, I can understand this; I saw her sitting by the tree.
- It can serve as a simple adjective: It is a thrilling book.

The same form used as a gerund has the following uses:

- It forms verbal phrases that are then used as nouns: Lying in bed is my favorite hobby.
- It forms similar phrases used as a complement of certain verbs: He tried writing novels.

The logical subject of a phrase formed with a gerund can be expressed by a possessive, as in I do not like your/Jim's drinking wine, although a non-possessive noun or pronoun is often used instead, especially in informal English: I do not like you/Jim drinking wine. The latter usage, though common, is sometimes considered ungrammatical or stylistically poor; it is given names like fused participle and geriple since it is seen to confuse a participle with a gerund. For more information see fused participle.

Gerund forms are often used as plain verbal nouns, which function grammatically like common nouns (in particular, by being qualified by adjectives rather than adverbs): He did some excellent writing (compare the gerund: He is known for writing excellently). Such verbal nouns can function, for instance, as noun adjuncts, as in a writing desk.

== Objects and complements ==
Verbs are used in certain patterns which require the presence of specific arguments in the form of objects and other complements of particular types. (A given verb may be usable in one or more of these patterns.)

A verb with a direct object is called a transitive verb. Some transitive verbs have an indirect object in addition to the direct object. Verbs used without objects are called intransitive. Both transitive and intransitive verbs may also have additional complements that are not considered objects.

A single (direct) object generally follows the verb: I love you. If there is an indirect object, it precedes the direct object (I gave him the book), although an indirect object can also be expressed with a prepositional phrase following the direct object (and this method is usual when the direct object is a personal pronoun): I gave the book to John; I bought them for you.

Other complements may include prepositional phrases, non-finite clauses and content clauses, depending on the applicable verb pattern. These complements normally follow any objects. For example:

- I insist on coming. (this use of the verb insist involves a prepositional phrase with on)
- I expect to arrive tomorrow. (this use of expect involves a to-infinitive phrase)
- I asked him whether he was coming. (this use of ask involves a direct object (him) and an interrogative content clause)

More examples can be found at Verb patterns with the gerund.

English has a number of ergative verbs: verbs which can be used either intransitively or transitively, where in the intransitive use it is the subject that is receiving the action, and in the transitive use the direct object is receiving the action while the subject is causing it. An example is sink: The ship sank (intransitive use); The explosion sank the ship (transitive use). Other common examples include open, sink, wake, melt, boil, collapse, explode, freeze, start, sell.

For more details on how verbs are built up into clauses, see English clause syntax.

== Phrasal verbs ==
Many English verbs are used in particular combinations with adverbial modifiers such as on, away, out, etc. Often these combinations take on independent meanings. They are referred to as phrasal verbs. (This term may also include verbs used with a complement introduced by a particular preposition that gives it a special meaning, as in take to (someone).)

The adverbial particle in a phrasal verb generally appears close after the verb, though it may follow the object, particularly when the object is a pronoun: Hand over the money or Hand the money over, but Hand it over.

== See also ==
- Conditional sentence
- English grammar
- English irregular verbs
- English modal verbs
- English passive voice
- Wiktionary appendix: Irregular English verbs
- Northern subject rule
- Conversion (word formation)
- Uses of English verb forms
