= Dalmatian grammar =

Grammar of the Dalmatian language

This article outlines the grammar of the Dalmatian language.

== Nouns ==
A Dalmatian noun has a gender (masculine or feminine) and is inflected for number (singular or plural). The plural is formed with the ending -i for masculine and -e for feminine nouns.

== Articles ==
The indefinite article is ioin (one), whose feminine form is ioina.

Examples:

- ioina kuosa – one house, a house
- ioin jomno – one man, a man

The definite article for masculine nouns is el in singular and i in plural. The definite article for feminine nouns is la in singular and le in plural. Before place names in the dative case, the articles are used in the forms in tel, in tela, in teli and in tele or abbreviated as nel, nela, neli and nele.

Examples:

- Če sant el? – What is it?
- La sant ioina kuosa. – It is a house.
- Jo sant la kuosa? – Where is the house?
- La kuosa sant in tela Čituot. – The house is in the city.
- Jo sant el Juarbol? – Where is the tree?
- El Juarbol sant in tel buasc. – The tree is in the wood.

== Adjectives ==
The adjectives are used before nouns and also have masculine and feminine gender and singular and plural number.

Examples:

- Maura kuosa – Big house
- La maura kuosa – The big house
- Briv kavul – Fast horse
- El briv kavul – The fast horse

== Pronouns ==
=== Personal pronouns ===
==== Nominative ====
Singular

| Person | Pronoun | Meaning |
|---|---|---|
| First | ju | I |
| Second | te | thou |
| Third | jal | he |
| Third | jala | she |

Plural

| Person | Pronoun | Meaning |
|---|---|---|
| First | nu | we |
| Second | vu | ye |
| Third | jali | they |
| Third | jale | they |

==== Oblique ====
Singular

| Person | Pronoun | Meaning |
|---|---|---|
| First | me/main | me |
| Second | toi | thee |
| Third | joi | him |
| Third | joe | her |

Plural

| Person | Pronoun | Meaning |
|---|---|---|
| First | noi | us |
| Second | voi | you |
| Third | jai | them |

==== Possessive ====
Singular

| Person | Pronoun | Meaning |
|---|---|---|
| First | mi/maja | my |
| Second | to/toa | thy |
| Third | de jal | his |
| Third | de jala | her |

Plural

| Person | Pronoun | Meaning |
|---|---|---|
| First | nuester/nuestra | our |
| Second | vester/vestra | your |
| Third | de jali | their |
| Third | de jale | their |

== Prepositions ==
- in – in
- bas de – below
- de – of
- da – from, of
- dri – behind
- saupra – on
- alič – at

== Verbs ==
The Dalmatian language does not distinguish between the continuous and simple forms. The present tense is formed from the personal pronoun, the infinitive stem, and the present endings:

Singular

1. -a, -uo
2. -e
3. -a, -uo

Plural

1. -aime
2. -aite
3. -a, -uo

Example: favular (to speak)

Singular

1. Ju favula (I speak, I am speaking)
2. Te favule (Thou speakest, thou art speaking)
3. Jal favula (He speaks, he is speaking)

Plural

1. Nu favulaime (We speak, we are speaking)
2. Vu favulaite (Ye speak, ye are speaking)
3. Jali favula (They speak, they are speaking)

The past tense is formed from the personal pronoun, the infinitive stem, the suffixes -ua or -oua, and the present endings.

Singular

1. Ju favlua (I was speaking, I spoke)
2. Te favlue (Thou wast speaking, thou spokest)
3. Jal favlua (He was speaking, he spoke)

Plural

1. Nu favluaime (We were speaking, we spoke)
2. Vu favluaite (Ye were speaking, ye spoke)
3. Jali favlua (They were speaking, they spoke)

The future tense is formed from the infinitive form (ending in -ar, -ur, or -ro) and the future endings:

Singular

1. -e
2. -e
3. -e

Plural

1. -me
2. -te
3. -e

Examples:

Singular

1. Ju favulare (I shall speak)
2. Te favulare (Thou wilt speak)
3. Jal favulare (He will speak)

Plural

1. Nu favularme (We shall speak)
2. Vu favularte (Ye will speak)
3. Jal favulare (They will speak)

The passive is formed from the past participle (ending in -ait, -oit, or -uat) and the prefixes joi or jai.

Examples:

1. joi nascoit (is born)
2. jai glazait (is frozen)
3. joi taliuat (is cut)

The Dalmatian language has also a conditional form:

- Sta nuat el foit en maur gheluat, kve tota la jakva joi glazait.
  - Last night it was so cold, and all water has been frozen.

The imperative is formed from the infinitive stem and endings:

- -ai – second person singular
- -aite – second person plural

Examples:

- duai! – give!
- vedai! – look!

The imperative can also be formed from the imperative form of the verb "to be" and the infinitive:

- Saime vedar – Let us go
- Sait fuot – Let it be

The verb "to be":

Infinitive: Saite

Singular

1. Ju sai
2. Te sante
3. Jal sant

Plural

1. Nu saime
2. Vu saite
3. Jali sant

== Adverbs ==
Adverbs of place and direction:

- luc – here
- cauc – there
- sois – upwards
- sote – under
- dri – behind

Adverbs of time:

- aninč – before
- dapu – after
- diatremun – then
- junkaura – against, still
- adias – now
