= Suffix =

Morpheme placed at the end of a word

In linguistics, a suffix is an affix which is placed after the stem and the prefix of a word. Common examples are case endings, which indicate the grammatical case of nouns and adjectives, and verb endings, which form the conjugation of verbs.

Suffixes can carry grammatical information (inflectional endings) or lexical information (derivational/lexical suffixes). Inflection changes the grammatical properties of a word within its syntactic category. Derivational suffixes fall into two categories: class-changing derivation and class-maintaining derivation.

Particularly in the study of Semitic languages, suffixes are called affirmatives, as they can alter the form of the words. In Indo-European studies, a distinction is made between suffixes and endings (see Proto-Indo-European root).

A word-final segment that is somewhere between a free morpheme and a bound morpheme is known as a suffixoid or a semi-suffix (e.g., English -like or German -freundlich "friendly").

== Examples ==
=== Latin ===
Britannia—where the suffix ia means Land of the

=== English ===
Girls—where the suffix -s marks the plurality.
He makes—where the suffix -s marks the third person singular present tense.
It closed—where the suffix -ed marks the past tense.
It's brighter—where the suffix -er marks the comparative.

=== French ===
De beaux jours—where the suffix -x marks the plural.
Elle est passablement jolie —where the suffix -e marks the feminine form of the adjective.

=== German ===
mein Computer—where the lack of suffixes is because its case, nominative, is "unmarked"
meines Computers—genitive case
meinem Computer—dative case
meinen Computer—accusative case

=== Russian ===
мой компьютер—where the lack of suffixes is because its case, nominative, is "unmarked"
моего компьютера—genitive case
моему компьютеру—dative case
мой компьютер—accusative case
за-туш-и-ть свечу—where first word has -и- suffix, -ть ending (infinitive form); second word with ending -у (accusative case, singular, feminine).
добр-о-жел-а-тель-н-ый—добр- root, -о- interfix, -жел- root, verbal -a- interfix, nominal -тель suffix, adjectival -н- suffix, adjectival -ый ending (nominative case, singular, masculine).
выда-ющ-ий-ся—here suffix -ся (reflexive) is so-called postfix as it is placed after the adjectival ending.

=== Barngarla ===
wárraidya "emu" — where the lack of suffixes is because its grammatical number, singular, is "unmarked"
wárraidyalbili "two emus" — dual
wárraidyarri "emus" — plural
wárraidyailyarranha "a lot of emus", "heaps of emus" — superplural

== Inflectional suffixes ==
Inflection changes the grammatical properties of a word within its syntactic category. In several languages, this is realized by an inflectional suffix, also known as desinence. In the example:

I was hoping the cloth wouldn't fade, but it has faded quite a bit.

the suffix -d inflects the root-word fade to indicate past participle.

Inflectional suffixes do not change the word class of the word after the inflection. Inflectional suffixes in Modern English include:

=== Verbs ===
- -s third person singular simple present indicative active
- -ed past tense and past participle
- -t past tense (weak irregular)
- -ing present participle and gerund
- -en past participle (irregular)

=== Nouns ===
- -s plural number
- -en plural number (irregular)

=== Adjectives and adverbs ===
- -er comparative degree
- -est superlative degree

== Derivation ==
Derivational suffixes can be divided into two categories: class-changing derivation and class-maintaining derivation. In English, they include

- -ly/-ally (changes adjectives into adverbs, but also some nouns into adjectives)
- -al /-ual (usually changes nouns into adjectives)
- -ic /-ical (usually changes nouns into adjectives)
- -ish (usually changes nouns into adjectives/class-maintaining, with the word class remaining an adjective)
- -ful (usually changes nouns into adjectives)
- -oid (changes nouns into adjectives, which can also function as nouns with distinct meaning)
- -like (usually changes nouns into adjectives)
- -less (usually changes nouns into negative adjectives)
- -able/-ible (usually changes verbs into adjectives)
- -ant (usually changes verbs into nouns, often referring to a human agent)
- -tion/-ion/-ation (usually changes verbs into nouns)
- -ment (usually changes verbs into nouns)
- -ity (usually changes adjectives into nouns)
- -ness (usually changes adjectives into nouns)
- -fy (usually changes nouns into verbs)
- -ise/-ize (usually changes nouns into verbs)
- -ess (usually class-maintaining, with the word class remaining a noun)
- -ism (usually class-maintaining, with the word class remaining a noun)
- -ist (usually class-maintaining, with the word class remaining a noun)
- -hood (usually class-maintaining, with the word class remaining a noun)
- -logy/-ology (usually class-maintaining, with the word class remaining a noun)
- -um (usually) museum; stadium; auditorium; aquarium; planetarium; medium
- -wise From wīse ("manner, way, condition, direction")

== Altered pronunciation in English ==
A suffix will often change the stress or accent pattern of a multi-syllable word, altering the phoneme pattern of the root word even if the root's morphology does not change. An example is the difference between "photograph" and "photography". In this case, the "-y" ending governs the stress pattern, causing the primary stress to shift from the first syllable ("pho-") to the antepenultimate ("-to-"). The unaccented syllables have their ordinary vowel sound changed to a schwa. This can be a particular problem for dyslexics, affecting their phonemic awareness, as well as a hurdle for non-native speakers.
