= -ing =

English language suffix

-ing is a suffix used to make one of the inflected forms of English verbs. This verb form is used as a present participle, as a gerund, and sometimes as an independent noun or adjective. The suffix is also found in certain words like morning and ceiling, and in names such as Browning.

== Etymology and pronunciation ==
The Modern English -ing ending, which is used to form both gerunds and present participles of verbs (i.e. in noun and adjective uses), derives from two different historical suffixes.

The gerund (noun) use comes from Middle English -ing, which is from Old English -ing, -ung (suffixes forming nouns from verbs). These in turn are from Proto-Germanic *-inga-, *-unga-, *-ingō, *-ungō, which Vittore Pisani derives from Proto-Indo-European *-enkw-. This use of English -ing is thus cognate with the -ing suffix of Dutch, West Frisian, and the North Germanic languages, and with German -ung.

The -ing of Modern English in its participial (adjectival) use comes from Middle English -inge, -ynge, supplanting the earlier -inde, -ende, -and, from the Old English present participle ending -ende. This is from Proto-Germanic *-andz, from the Proto-Indo-European *-nt-, and is cognate with Dutch and German -end, Swedish -ande, -ende, Latin -ans, -ant-, Ancient Greek -ον (-on), and Sanskrit -ant. -inde, -ende, -and later assimilated with the noun and gerund suffix -ing. Its remnants, however, are still retained in a few verb-derived words such as friend, fiend, and bond (in the sense of "peasant, vassal").

The standard pronunciation in modern English is /ɪŋ/, with a velar nasal consonant. Variants include /ɪŋg/ (e.g. Northern England), /ɪn/ or /ən/ (widespread) and /i(ː)n/ (mainly US, but also in Canada).

The variants with /n/ may be denoted in writing with an apostrophe: runnin' for running. Sometimes known as g-dropping, the use of variants such as these is one of the most frequently studied sociolinguistic variables in English. The /n/ variants are believed to descend directly from the aforementioned Old English participle suffix -ende.

== Formation ==
All English verbs (except for modals and other defective verbs that do not have gerunds or participles) make the inflected form in ‑ing regularly. Thus go makes going, read makes reading, fail makes failing, and so on. In certain cases there are spelling changes, such as doubling of consonants (as in sit → sitting) or omission of mute e (as in change → changing). It does not apply in the case of monosyllabic words in English that are omitting the mute e (as in age becoming ageing, though aging is also found). For details of these rules, see English verbs.

== Uses ==
The -ing form of a verb has both noun uses and adjectival (or adverbial) uses. In either case it may function as a non-finite verb (for example, by taking direct objects), or as a pure noun or adjective. When it behaves as a non-finite verb, it is called a gerund in the noun case, and a present participle in the adjectival or adverbial case. Uses as pure noun or adjective may be called deverbal uses.

The distinctions between these uses are explained in the following sections.

=== Distinction between gerunds and present participles ===
Gerunds and present participles are two types of non-finite verb; the difference is that gerunds are used to produce noun phrases, and participles to produce adjectival or adverbial phrases. This is illustrated in the following examples:

- I like eating cakes.

Here eating is a gerund; the verb phrase eating cakes serves as a noun, being the object of the main verb like.

- I saw him eating a cake.

Here eating is a present participle; the verb phrase eating a cake serves as an adjective, modifying him.

- Trying to succeed makes success more likely.

Here trying is a gerund; the verb phrase trying to succeed serves as a noun, the subject of the main verb makes.

- He hurt his knee trying to get over the fence.

Here trying is a present participle; the verb phrase trying to get over the fence has the function of an adverb in the main clause.

Confusion is most likely to arise when the -ing word follows a verb, in which case it may be a predicate adjective and hence a participle, or a direct object (or predicate nominative) and hence a gerund. There are certain transformations that can help distinguish these two cases. In the table that follows, the transformations produce grammatical sentences with similar meanings when applied to sentences with gerunds (since the transformations are based on the assumption that the phrase with the -ing word is a noun phrase). When applied to sentences with participles, they produce ungrammatical sentences or sentences with completely different meanings. (These cases are marked with asterisks.)

Transformation	Gerund use	Participle use
(none)	John suggested asking Bill.	John kept asking Bill.
Passivization	Asking Bill was suggested.	*Asking Bill was kept.
Pronoun substitution	John suggested it.	*John kept it.
Substitution of pure noun	John suggested the asking of Bill.	*John kept the asking of Bill.
Replacement with finite clause	John suggested that Bill be asked.	*John kept that Bill be asked.
Subject marking with possessive	John suggested our asking Bill.	*John kept his asking Bill.
Clefting	Asking Bill is what John suggested.	*Asking Bill is what John kept.
Left dislocation	Asking Bill John suggested.	*Asking Bill John kept.

For more details of the usage of English gerunds and present participles, see Uses of non-finite verbs in English.

=== Distinction between verbal and deverbal uses ===
When used as a gerund or present participle, the -ing form is a non-finite verb, which behaves like a (finite) verb in that it forms a verb phrase, taking typical verb dependents and modifiers such as objects and adverbs. That verb phrase is then used within a larger sentence, with the function of an adjective or adverb (in the case of the participle) or with the function of a noun (in the case of the gerund).

However the same verb-derived -ing forms are also sometimes used as pure nouns or adjectives. In this case the word does not form a verb phrase; any modifiers it takes will be of a grammatical kind which is appropriate to a noun or adjective respectively.

For example:

- Shouting loudly is rude. (shouting is a gerund, modified by the adverb loudly)
- Loud shouting is something I can't stand. (shouting is a pure noun, modified by the adjective loud)
- I saw him exciting the crowds. (exciting is a participle, taking the object the crowds)
- It was a very exciting game. (exciting is a pure adjective, modified by very, an adverb typically applied to adjectives)

When used as a pure noun or adjective (i.e. having lost its grammatical verbal character), the -ing form may be called a deverbal noun or deverbal adjective. Terminology varies, however; it may also be called a verbal noun or adjective (on the grounds that it is derived from a verb). In other cases the latter terms may be applied additionally, or exclusively, to gerunds and participles, as well as other non-finite verb forms such as infinitives.

In some situations, the distinction between gerund/participle uses and deverbal uses may be lost, particularly when the -ing word appears on its own. For example, in "I like swimming", it is not clear whether swimming is intended as a gerund (as it would be in "I like swimming fast"), or as a pure noun (as in "I like competitive swimming"). There may be a distinction in meaning between the two interpretations: as a gerund, it means that the speaker likes to swim, while as a pure noun it does not specify in what way the speaker enjoys the activity (as a competitor, spectator, etc.)

The -ing form used as a pure noun usually denotes the action encoded by the verb (either in general or in a particular instance), as in the above examples. However it sometimes comes to take on other meanings, such as a physical object or system of objects: building, fencing, piping, etc.

For more information on the uses of non-finite verbs and verbal nouns, see Uses of non-finite verbs in English.

== -ing words in other languages ==
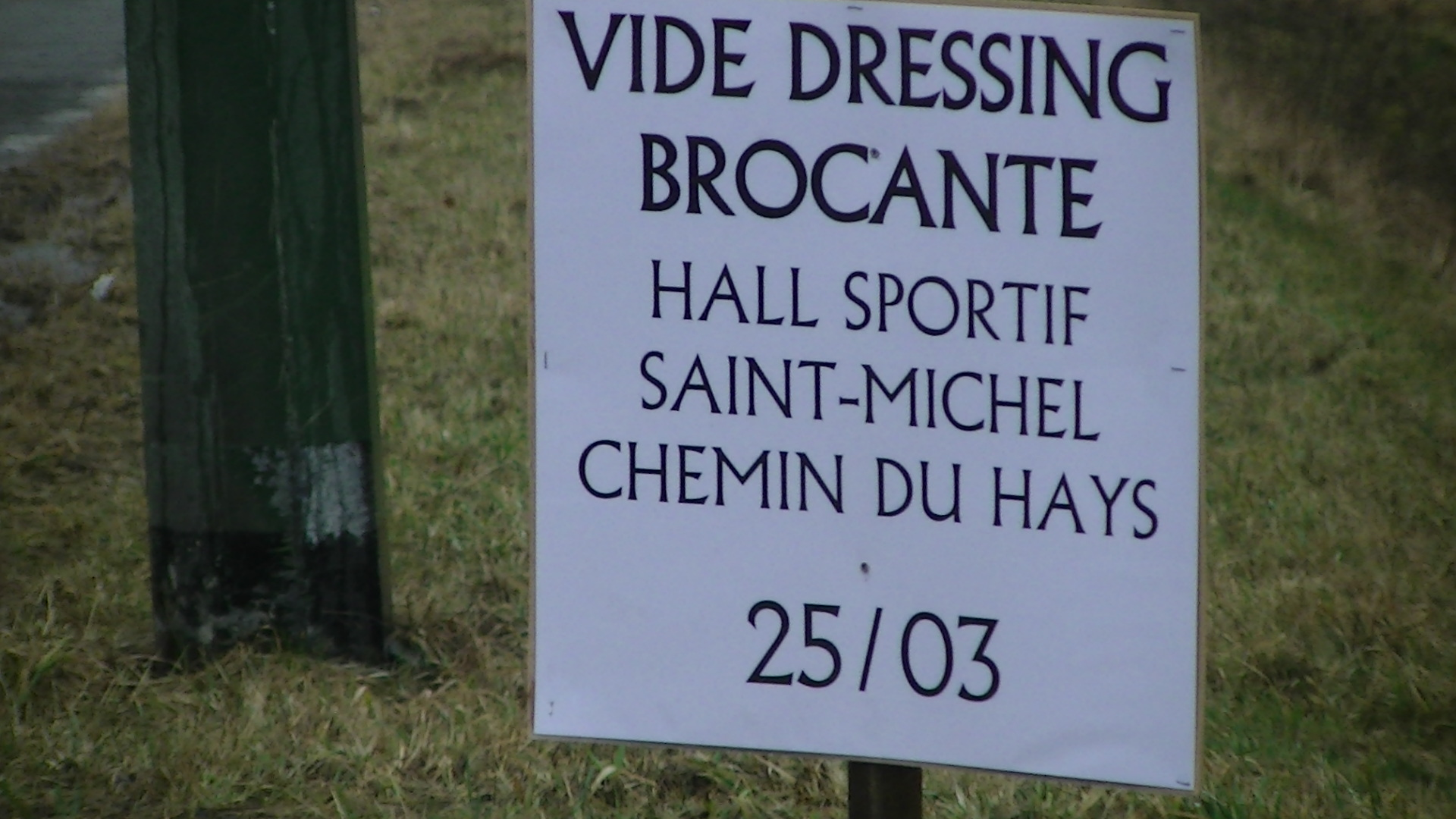
Sign showing a French ending -ing in one word dressing. Note: this is non-English.

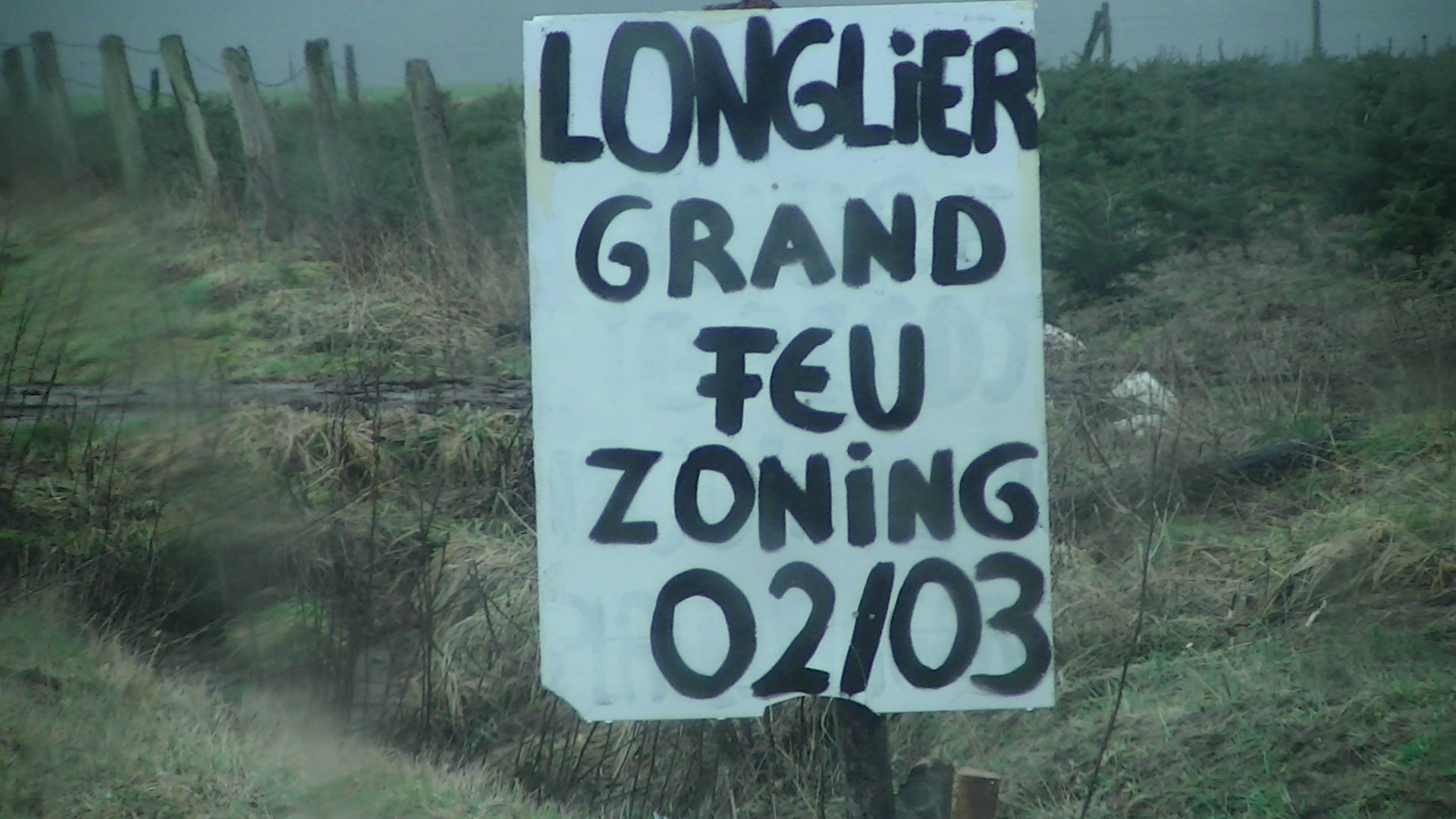
Sign of a singular form of French ending -ing.

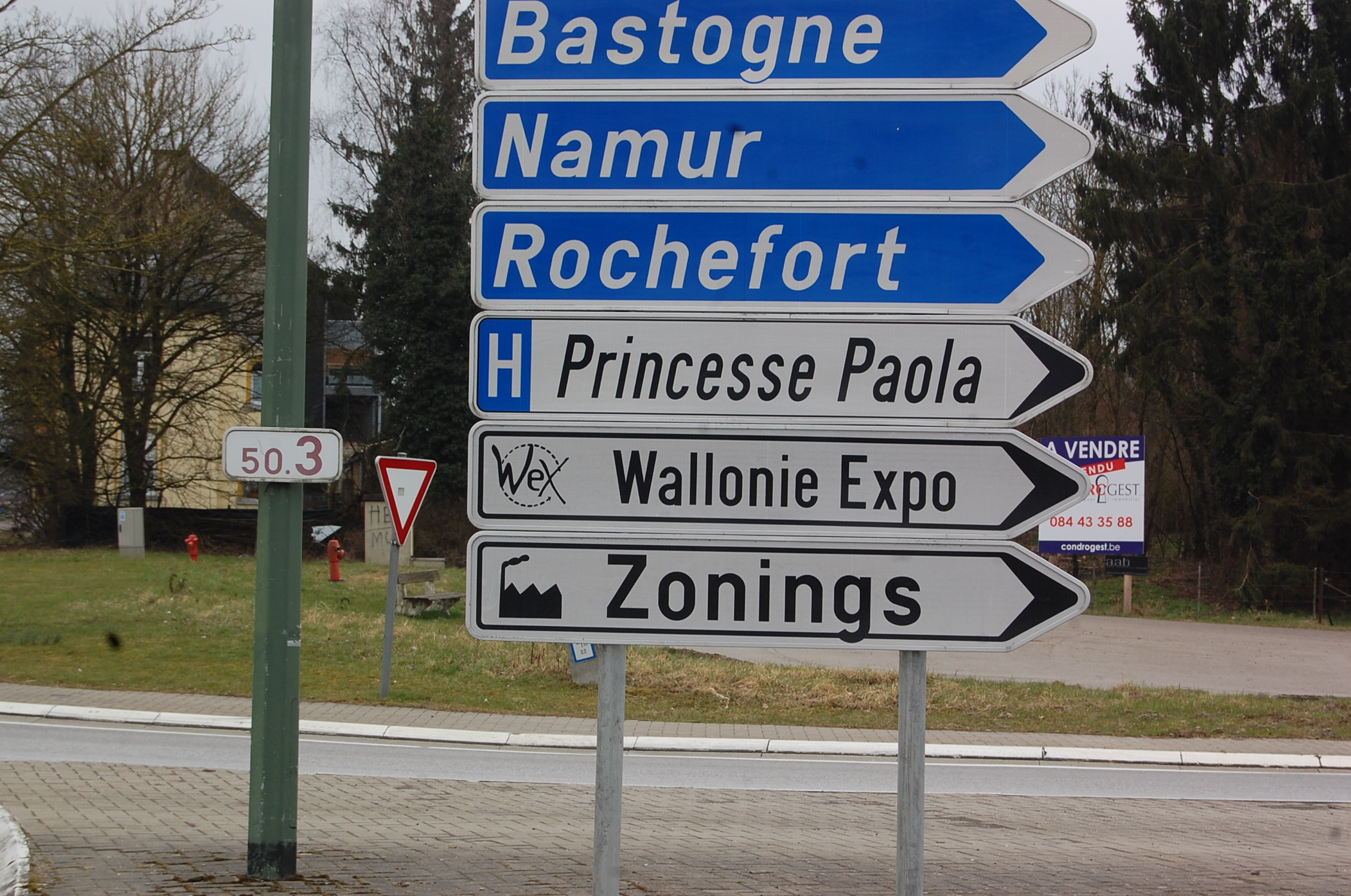
Sign of a plural form of French ending -ing.

English words constructed from verbs with the ending -ing are sometimes borrowed into other languages. In some cases they become pseudo-anglicisms, taking on new meanings or uses which are not found in English. For instance:

- brushing means "blow-dry" in many languages (including French, Portuguese, and Spanish);
- camping means "campsite" in many languages (including Bulgarian, Dutch, French, Greek, Hungarian, Italian, Portuguese, Romanian, Russian, and Spanish);
- footing has been used to mean "jogging" in some languages (including French and Italian)
- parking means "car park" or "parking lot" in many languages (including Bulgarian, Dutch, French, Italian, Persian, Polish, Russian, and Spanish);
- lifting means "facelift" in many languages (including Bulgarian, French, German, Italian, Polish, Romanian, Hebrew, and Spanish);
- shampooing means "shampoo" in French (pronounced [ʃɑ̃pwɛ̃]);
- shopping means "shopping mall" in Portuguese and Spanish;.

Other Germanic languages (including Dutch, Danish, Swedish, Norwegian, and Icelandic) have a native -ing suffix, used mainly to form verbal action nouns, though generally not as productively as in English. For details, see the Wiktionary entry for -ing.

In Balochi the suffix -ag is used in a similar manner as -ing, by adding the suffix to the first form of a verb in order to construct a continuous verb, or to convert a verb into a noun. For example, war (eat) becomes warag (eating) or Òšt (stand) becomes Òštag (standing).

== Other meanings of the suffix ==
The suffix -ing also has other uses in English, although these are less common. It may be used to form derivative nouns (originally masculine) with the sense "son of" or "belonging to", used as patronymics or diminutives. Examples of this use include surnames like Browning, Channing and Ewing, and common nouns like bunting, shilling, and farthing. The suffix can also mean "having a specified quality", as used in sweeting, whiting, and gelding.

For further details see the Wiktionary entry for -ing.

== See also ==
- Ng (digraph)
