= Past tense =

Grammatical tense

The past tense is a grammatical tense whose function is to place an action or situation in the past. Examples of verbs in the past tense include the English verbs sang, went and washed. Most languages have a past tense, with some having several types in order to indicate how far back the action took place. Some languages have a compound past tense which uses auxiliary verbs as well as an imperfect tense which expresses continuous or repetitive events or actions. Some languages inflect the verb, which changes the ending to indicate the past tense, while non-inflected languages may use other words meaning, for example, "yesterday" or "last week" to indicate that something took place in the past.

== Introduction ==
In some languages, the grammatical expression of past tense is combined with the expression of other categories such as grammatical aspect (see tense–aspect). Thus a language may have several types of past tense form, their use depending on what aspectual or other additional information is to be encoded. French, for example, has a compound past (passé composé) for expressing completed events, and imperfect for continuous or repetitive events.

Some languages that grammaticalise for past tense do so by inflecting the verb, while others do so periphrastically using auxiliary verbs, also known as "verbal operators" (and some do both, as in the example of French given above). Not all languages grammaticalise verbs for past tense – Mandarin Chinese, for example, mainly uses lexical means (words like "yesterday" or "last week") to indicate that something took place in the past, although use can also be made of the tense/aspect markers le and guo.

The "past time" to which the past tense refers generally means the past relative to the moment of speaking, although in contexts where relative tense is employed (as in some instances of indirect speech) it may mean the past relative to some other time being under discussion. A language's past tense may also have other uses besides referring to past time; for example, in English and certain other languages, the past tense is sometimes used in referring to hypothetical situations, such as in condition clauses like If you loved me ..., where the past tense loved is used even though there may be no connection with past time.

Some languages grammatically distinguish the recent past from remote past with separate tenses. There may be more than two distinctions.

In some languages, certain past tenses can carry an implication that the result of the action in question no longer holds. For example, in the Bantu language Chichewa, use of the remote past tense ánáamwalíra "he died" would be surprising since it would imply that the person was no longer dead. This kind of past tense is known as discontinuous past. Similarly certain imperfective past tenses (such as the English "used to") can carry an implication that the action referred to no longer takes place.

A general past tense can be indicated with the glossing abbreviation pst.

== Indo-European languages ==
The European continent is heavily dominated by Indo-European languages, all of which have a past tense. In some cases the tense is formed inflectionally as in English see/saw or walks/walked and as in the French imperfect form, and sometimes it is formed periphrastically, as in the French passé composé form. Further, all of the non-Indo-European languages in Europe, such as Basque, Hungarian, and Finnish, also have a past tense.

=== Germanic languages ===
==== English ====
In English, the past tense (or preterite) is one of the inflected forms of a verb. The past tense of regular verbs is made by adding -d or -ed to the base form of the verb, while those of irregular verbs are formed in various ways (such as see→saw, go→went, be→was/were). With regular and some irregular verbs, the past tense form also serves as a past participle. For full details of past tense formation, see English verbs.

Past events are often referred to using the present perfect construction, as in I have finished (also known as present in past). However this is not regarded as an instance of the past tense; instead it is viewed as a combination of present tense with perfect aspect, specifying a present state that results from past action. (It can be made into a past tense form by replacing the auxiliary have with had; see below.)

Various multi-word constructions exist for combining past tense with progressive (continuous) aspect, which denotes ongoing action; with perfect aspect; and with progressive and perfect aspects together. These and other common past tense constructions are listed below:

- The simple past consists of just the past tense (preterite) form of the verb (he walked, they flew, etc.), although when it is negated, emphasized or inverted it is sometimes necessary to unfuse the verb, using a periphrastic construction with did (as in did he walk? etc.) – see do-support. The simple past is used for describing single occurrences or habitual occurrences in the past, and sometimes for states existing in the past with no connection to the present (or where such connection is irrelevant), and sometimes for states and sensual perceptions existing in the past. It also describes short, one-time past actions that interrupt another action in the past (as in The telephone rang when I was watching TV). Additionally, it signals habitual or repeated actions in the past (as in Every morning he got up and ate breakfast before he went to work). It expresses an event that is understood to have happened before another past event without using the past perfect tense (as in When the play finished, the audience left quickly). In reported speech, it replaces the Present Simple (as in She thought I needed help). Finally, it is used to describe an unreal or unlikely event in the present (as in If you bought the car, you couldn't afford much more).
- The past progressive (past continuous) is formed using the simple past of be (was or were) with present participle (sometimes referred to as the -ing form) of the main verb: He was going. This form indicates that an action was ongoing at the past time under consideration, often interrupted by another past action (as in I was having a shower when you called). It describes an event that lasted for a certain period, emphasizing its duration and often implying it was unfinished (as in They were talking in a loud voice all night, and I couldn't sleep). It is used for two actions happening at the same time in the past (as in John was playing football while she was doing her homework). It also describes a temporary situation (as in When I got home, water was running down the kitchen walls). In reported speech, it replaces the present progressive, especially when referring to a near-future or long-lasting action (as in She told me she was getting married).
- The past perfect combines had (the simple past of have) with the past participle of the main verb: We had shouted. This denotes that an action occurred before a specified time in the past, and therefore has similar function to the pluperfect found in some languages. It appears with prepositions such as after, when, and as soon as (as in He went to Paris as soon as he had passed his exams). It follows the phrase it was the first time (as in It was the first time I had heard her sing). It expresses unfulfilled wishes and hopes (I had hoped we would leave tomorrow). It describes an unreal past event that was a condition for another unfulfilled event (as in If you had bought a car, you couldn't have afforded a holiday abroad). In reported speech, it replaces the Past Simple and Present Perfect (She announced that the rain had stopped).
- The past perfect progressive (sometimes referred to as the past perfect continuous) combines had (the simple past of have) with been (the past participle of be) and the present participle of the main verb: You had been waiting. It is used to refer to an ongoing action that continued up to the past time of reference. It indicates how long an event had lasted before a specific past moment (as in We had been walking since sunrise, and we were hungry). It emphasizes the continuity of an event rather than its completion (as in I had been reading science fiction, and my mind was full of strange images, whereas I had read all the magazines and got bored emphasizes completion). It describes relatively short-lived situations (as in My legs were stiff because I had been standing still for a long time, whereas The tree that blew down had stood there for 500 years emphasizes a long-lasting state). In reported speech, it replaces the past progressive and present perfect progressive (as in Mary's mother said she'd been having a wonderful time in Italy).
- The expression used to (with the infinitive of the main verb) denotes a past habitual situation (I used to play football when I was young), although with a stative verb it can just indicate that a state was continuously in effect (I used to belong to that club). It is often used to emphasize that something happened a long time ago and is no longer the case. Another way of referring to past habitual action is to use would, as in As a child I would play the piano every day, although this auxiliary has other uses as well. For further details see English modal verbs.

For details of the usage of the various constructions used to refer to the past, see Uses of English verb forms. The past tense is also used in referring to some hypothetical situations, not necessarily connected with past time, as in if I tried or I wish I knew. (For the possible use of were in place of was in such instances, see English subjunctive.)

==== German ====
German uses three forms for the past tense.

- The preterite (Präteritum) (called the "imperfect" in older grammar books, but this, a borrowing from Latin terminology, ill describes it.)
- The perfect (Perfekt)
- The past perfect (Plusquamperfekt)

In southern Germany, Austria and Switzerland, the preterite is mostly used solely in writing, for example in stories. Use in speech is regarded as snobbish and thus very uncommon. South German dialects, such as the Bavarian dialect, as well as Yiddish and Swiss German, have no preterite (with the exception of sein and wollen), but only perfect constructs.

In certain regions, a few specific verbs are used in the preterite, for instance the modal verbs and the verbs haben (have) and sein (be).

- Es gab einmal ein kleines Mädchen, das Rotkäppchen hieß. (There was once a small girl who was called Little Red Riding Hood.)

In speech and informal writing, the Perfekt is used (e.g., Ich habe dies und das gesagt. (I said this and that)).

However, in the oral mode of North Germany, there is still a very important difference between the preterite and the perfect, and both tenses are consequently very common. The preterite is used for past actions when the focus is on the action, whilst the present perfect is used for past actions when the focus is on the present state of the subject as a result of a previous action. This is somewhat similar to the English usage of the preterite and the present perfect.

- Preterite: "Heute früh kam mein Freund." (my friend came early in the morning, and he is being talked about strictly in the past)
- Perfect: "Heute früh ist mein Freund gekommen." (my friend came early in the morning, but he is being talked about in the present)

The past perfect is used in every German speaking country and it is used to place an action in the past before another action in the past. It is formed with an auxiliary (haben/sein) and a past participle that is placed at the end of the clause.

==== Dutch ====
Dutch mainly uses these two past tenses:

- onvoltooid verleden tijd, which matches the English simple past and the German preterite, for example: Gisteren was ik daar ("I was there yesterday").
- voltooid tegenwoordige tijd, a present tense with the meaning of perfect. This form is made by combining a form of zijn ("to be") or hebben ("to have") with the notional verb, for example: Gisteren ben ik daar geweest. This also means "I was there yesterday", but just as it is the case for English constructions with the present perfect simple, this kind of formulation puts more emphasis on the "being finished"-aspect.

Less common is the voltooid verleden tijd, which corresponds to the English past perfect. It is formed by combining an onvoltooid verleden form of zijn ("to be") or hebben ("to have") with the notional verb, for example: Ik was daar voor gisteren al geweest. This means "I had been there before yesterday." This tense is used to indicate that one action in the past occurred before another past action, and that the action was fully finished before the second action took place.

=== Other groups ===
In non-Germanic Indo-European languages, past marking is typically combined with a distinction between perfective and imperfective aspect, with the former reserved for single completed actions in the past. French for instance, has an imperfect tense form similar to that of German but used only for past habitual or past progressive contexts like "I used to..." or "I was doing...". Similar patterns extend across most languages of the Indo-European family right through to the Indic languages.

Unlike other Indo-European languages, in Slavic languages tense is independent of aspect, with imperfective and perfective aspects being indicated instead by means of prefixes, stem changes, or suppletion. In many West Slavic and East Slavic languages, the early Slavic past tenses have largely merged into a single past tense. In both West and East Slavic, verbs in the past tense are conjugated for gender (masculine, feminine, neuter) and number (singular, plural).

==== Romance ====
===== French =====
French has numerous forms of the past tense including but not limited to:

- Past perfective (passé composé) e.g. J'ai mangé (I ate or I have eaten, using the form but usually not the meaning of I have eaten)
- Past imperfective (imparfait) e.g. Je mangeais (I was eating)
- Past historic or Simple past (passé simple) e.g. Je mangeai (I ate) (literary only)
- Pluperfect (Plus que parfait) e.g. J'avais mangé (I had eaten [before another event in the past])
- Recent past (passé recent) e.g. Je viens de manger (I just ate or I have just eaten)

===== Spanish and Portuguese =====
Spanish and Portuguese have several forms of the past tense, which include but are not limited to:

- Preterite tense (préterito, pretérito) e.g. Yo comí and Eu comi (I ate or I have eaten)
- Past imperfective (imperfecto, imperfeito) e.g. Yo comía and Eu comia (I was eating)
- Pluperfect (pluperfecto, mais-que-perfeito) e.g. Yo había comido or Yo hube comido and Eu comera or Eu tinha comido (I had eaten [before another event in the past])

A difference in the pluperfect occurs between Spanish and Portuguese; in the latter, a synthetic pluperfect exists which follows the imperfect conjugations, but -ra replaces the -va seen in the verb endings.

== African languages ==
While in Semitic languages tripartite non-past/past imperfective/past perfective systems similar to those of most Indo-European languages are found, in the rest of Africa past tenses have very different forms from those found in European languages. Berber languages have only the perfective/imperfective distinction and lack a past imperfect.

Many non-Bantu Niger–Congo languages of West Africa do not mark past tense at all but instead have a form of perfect derived from a word meaning "to finish". Others, such as Ewe, distinguish only between future and non-future.

In complete contrast, Bantu languages such as Zulu have not only a past tense, but also a less remote proximal tense which is used for very recent past events and is never interchangeable with the ordinary past form. These languages also differ substantially from European languages in coding tense with prefixes instead of such suffixes as English -ed.

Other, smaller language families of Africa follow quite regional patterns. Thus the Sudanic languages of East Africa and adjacent Afro-Asiatic families are part of the same area with inflectional past-marking that extends into Europe, whereas more westerly Nilo-Saharan languages often do not have past tense.

== Asian languages ==
Past tenses are found in a variety of Asian languages. These include the Indo-European languages Russian in North Asia and Persian, Urdu, Nepali and Hindi in Southwest and South Asia; the Turkic languages Turkish, Turkmen, Kazakh, and Uyghur of Southwest and Central Asia; Arabic and Hebrew in Southwest Asia; Japanese; the Dravidian languages of India; the Uralic languages of Russia; Mongolic; and Korean. Languages in East Asia and Southeast Asia typically do not distinguish tense; in Mandarin Chinese, for example, the particle 了le when used immediately after a verb instead indicates perfective aspect.

In parts of islands in Southeast Asia, even less distinction is made, for instance in Indonesian and some other Austronesian languages. Past tenses, do, however, exist in most Oceanic languages.

== The Americas ==
Among Native American languages there is a split between complete absence of past marking (especially common in Mesoamerica and the Pacific Northwest) and very complex tense marking with numerous specialised remoteness distinctions, as found for instance in Athabaskan languages and a few languages of the Amazon Basin. Some of these tenses can have specialised mythological significance and uses.

A number of Native American languages like Northern Paiute stand in contrast to European notions of tense because they always use relative tense, which means time relative to a reference point that may not coincide with the time an utterance is made.

== New Guinea ==
Papuan languages of New Guinea almost always have remoteness distinctions in the past tense (though none are as elaborate as some Native American languages), whilst indigenous Australian languages usually have a single past tense without remoteness distinctions.

== Creole languages ==
Creole languages tend to make tense marking optional, and when tense is marked invariant pre-verbal markers are used.

=== Belizean Creole ===
In Belizean Creole, past tense marking is optional and is rarely used if a semantic temporal marker such as yestudeh "yesterday" is present.

=== Hawaiian Creole English ===
Hawaiian Creole English optionally marks the past tense with the invariant pre-verbal marker wen or bin (especially older speakers) or haed (especially on the island Kauai). (Ai wen si om "I saw him"; Ai bin klin ap mai ples for da halade "I cleaned up my place for the holiday"; De haed plei BYU laes wik "They played BYU last week"). The past habitual marker is yustu (Yo mada yustu tink so "Your mother used to think so").

=== Haitian Creole ===
Haitian Creole can indicate past tense with the pre-verbal marker te (Li te vini "He (past) come", "He came").
