= Pluperfect =

Grammatical tense

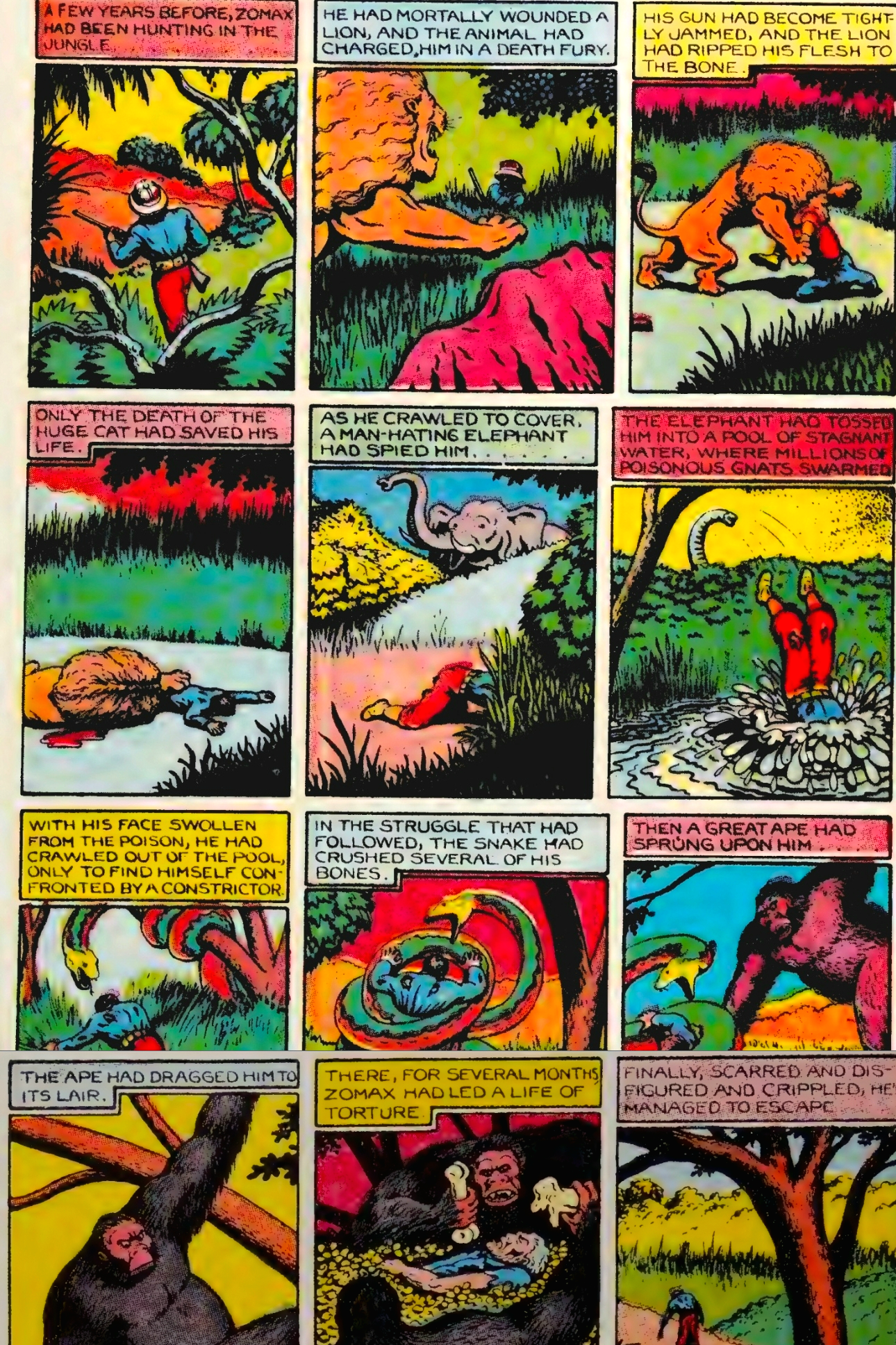
Extended use of pluperfect in a 1941 comic book

The pluperfect (shortening of plusquamperfect), usually called past perfect in English, characterizes certain verb forms and grammatical tenses involving an action from an antecedent point in time. Examples in English are: "we had arrived" before the game began; "they had been writing" when the bell rang.

The word is derived from the Latin plus quam perfectum, "more than perfect". The word "perfect" in this sense means "completed"; it contrasts with the "imperfect", which denotes uncompleted actions or states.

In English grammar, the pluperfect (e.g. "had written") is now usually called the past perfect, since it combines past tense with perfect aspect. (The same term is sometimes used in relation to the grammar of other languages.) English also has a past perfect progressive (or past perfect continuous) form: "had been writing".

== Meaning of the pluperfect ==
The pluperfect is traditionally described as a tense; in modern linguistic terminology it may be said to combine tense with grammatical aspect; namely past tense (reference to past time) and perfect aspect. It is used to refer to an occurrence that at a past time had already been started (but not necessarily completed), (e.g. "It had already been raining for a week when the big storm started.").

Bernard Comrie classifies the pluperfect as an absolute-relative tense, because it absolutely (not by context) establishes a deixis (the past event) and places the action relative to the deixis (before it).

Examples of the English pluperfect (past perfect) are found in the following sentence (from Viktor Frankl's Man's Search for Meaning):

A man who for years had thought he had reached the absolute limit of all possible suffering now found that suffering had no limits, and that he could suffer still more, and more intensely.

Here, "had thought" and "had reached" are examples of the pluperfect. They refer to an event (a man thinking he has reached the limit of his capacity to suffer), which takes place before another event (the man finding that his capacity to suffer has no limit), that is itself a past event, referred to using the past tense (found). The pluperfect is needed to make it clear that the first event (the thinking and the supposed reaching) is placed even earlier in the past.

== Examples from various languages ==
Some languages, like Latin, make pluperfects purely by inflecting the verb, whereas most modern European languages do so using appropriate auxiliary verbs in combination with past participles.

=== Greek ===
Ancient Greek verbs had a pluperfect form (called ὑπερσυντέλικος, "more than completed"). An example is ἐτεθύκει, "had sacrificed" – compare the perfect τέθυκε, "has sacrificed". Modern Greek uses auxiliaries to form the pluperfect; examples are given in the table at the end of this article.

=== Latin and Romance languages ===
In Latin, the pluperfect (plus quam perfectum) is formed without an auxiliary verb in the active voice, and with an auxiliary verb plus the perfect passive participle in the passive voice. For example, in the indicative mood:

- Pecuniam mercatori dederat. ("He had given money to the merchant"; active)
- Pecunia mercatori data erat. ("Money had been given to the merchant"; passive)

The subjunctive mood is formed similarly (in this case dedisset and data esset respectively). In many cases an ablative absolute phrase, consisting of a noun and perfect participle in the ablative case, may be used in place of a pluperfect; for example: Pecuniis mercatori datis, cessit emptor, "When money had been given (more literally: Money having been given) to the merchant, the buyer left."

==== French ====
In French, the indicative pluperfect (Plus-que-parfait, "more than perfect") is formed by taking the appropriate form of the imperfect indicative of the auxiliaries avoir or être and adding the past participle, j'avais mangé. Another type of pluperfect (passé antérieur, "past anterior") can be formed with the appropriate simple past form of the auxiliary: j'eus mangé, though it is rarely used now.

English	French	Tense	Notes
I went to the library	Je suis allé(e) à la bibliothèque	Passé composé	"suis" is the present conjugation of "être"
I had already gone to the library when you arrived at my place	J'étais déjà allé(e) à la bibliothèque quand tu es arrivé chez moi	Plus-que-parfait	In the first clause, "étais" is the imperfect conjugation of "être"

==== Italian ====
In Italian, there are two pluperfects in the indicative mood: the recent pluperfect (trapassato prossimo) and the remote pluperfect (trapassato remoto). The recent pluperfect is formed analogously to French by using the imperfect of the appropriate auxiliary verb (essere or avere) plus the past participle. For example: Ero affamato perché non avevo mangiato, "I was hungry because I had not eaten". The remote pluperfect is formed by using the preterite of the appropriate auxiliary verb plus the past participle. In the Italian consecutio temporum, the trapassato remoto should be used for completed actions in a clause subjugated to a clause whose verb is in the preterite.

- Example (remote pluperfect): "Dopo che lo ebbi trovato, lo vendetti". (After I had found it, I sold it)
- Example (recent pluperfect): "Dopo che lo avevo trovato, lo vendevo". (After I had found it, I would sell it)

The second example may refer to an event that happened continuously or habitually in the past. (I.e. "After I used to find it, I would sell it" OR "After I would find it, I would sell it"). The first example, being the preterite, refers only to actions completed once in the remote past, or distant past.

==== Judeo-Spanish ====
In Judeo-Spanish, the Latin pluperfect forms with little alteration have been preserved (e.g. final /m/ and /t/ are dropped) to express this tense (pluskuamperfekto), which is identical in form to the imperfect subjunctive. It has a similar form to the Portuguese, thus, the Portuguese example below, in Judeo-Spanish, is: Kuando yegí suve ke mi haver morera, 'When I came I knew that my friend had died'. It remains the main spoken form, though in some varieties, similarly to Spanish or Portuguese, the pluperfect is formed using the auxiliary verbs tener or aver plus the past participle. For example, Kuando yegí suve ke mi haver tuve morido or Kuando yegí suve ke mi haver avía morido.

==== Galician-Portuguese ====
In Portuguese and Galician, a synthetic pluperfect (mais-que-perfeito or antepretérito) has been conserved from Latin. For example, Quando cheguei, soube que o meu amigo morrera, 'When I came, I found out that my friend had died'. In Portuguese, however, its use has become mostly literary, and particularly in spoken communication, the pluperfect is usually formed using the auxiliary verb ter, in the imperfect form (tinha tinhas tinha tínhamos tínheis tinham) plus the past participle. For example, Quando cheguei, soube que o meu amigo tinha morrido. A more formal way of expressing the pluperfect uses the verb "haver". For example: Quando cheguei, soube que o meu amigo havia morrido. This periphrastic construction is not permitted in Galician, so Galician uses the synthetic pluperfect exclusively.

==== Romanian ====
In Romanian, the pluperfect (mai mult ca perfect) is expressed without any auxiliary words, using a particular form of the verb, originated in the Latin pluperfect subjunctive (compare Italian imperfect subjunctive Sembrava che Elsa non venisse with Romanian pluperfect Părea că Elsa nu venise). For example, in Când l-am întrebat, el văzuse deja filmul 'When I asked him, he had already seen the movie'. The verb văzuse is in the pluperfect form of a vedea 'to see'. Technically, this form is obtained from the singular third person form of the simple perfect tense by adding specific terminations for each person and number. However, in northern Transylvania there is a regional way to state the pluperfect (that may reflect the German influence). The pluperfect is expressed by combining the auxiliary verb fost or the short version fo' (= "was" in English or "war" in German) with the participle, which (quite difficult to explain) is stated in its feminine form. Examples: o fost foastă (or o fo' foastă) = he had been; am fost văzută = I had seen; or fost venită = they had come.

==== Sicilian and Pantesco ====
In Sicilian, the pluperfect is formed in the standard manner for modern Romance languages, using the verb "to have" inflected into the imperfect tense and a past participle which is invariable according to person and number. However, in the Pantesco dialect of the language, an alternative structure using the verb "to be" is found. In this structure, the 3rd person singular imperfect of the verb to be (era, "he/she/it was") is used to indicate the pluperferct, which is followed the preterite, conjugated for number and person. This structure has similarities to the pluperfect in Maltese, and therefore it appears likely that the Pantesco form was influenced by the Arabic dialect formerly spoken on Pantelleria.

The singular of the pluperfect in Sicilian, Pantesco and Maltese
Sicilian		Pantesco		Maltese	
Auxiliary Verb	Main Verb	Auxiliary Verb	Main Verb	Auxiliary Verb	Main Verb
àva have.IMPF.1SG	scrivutu write.PTP.M.SG	era be.IMPF.3SG	scrissi write.PRF.1SG	kont be.PFV.1SG	ktibt write.PFV.1SG
àutu have.IMPF.2SG	scrivutu write.PTP.M.SG	era be.IMPF.3SG	scrivìsti write.PRF.2SG	kont be.PFV.2SG	ktibt write.PFV.2SG
àva have.IMPF.3SG	scrivutu write.PTP.M.SG	era be.IMPF.3SG	scrissi write.PRF.3SG	kien be.PFV.3SG.M	kíteb write.PFV.3SG.M
àva have.IMPF.3SG	scrivutu write.PTP.M.SG	era be.IMPF.3SG	scrissi write.PRF.3SG	kienet be.PFV.3SG.F	kítbet write.PFV.3SG.F

==== Spanish ====
In Spanish, there are also two pluperfects, being the pluperfect proper (pluscuamperfecto, or antecopretérito) and the so called pretérito anterior (or antepretérito). While the former uses the imperfect of the auxiliary verb haber plus the past participle, the latter is formed with the simple past of haber plus the past participle. For example, in pluperfect Había comido cuando mi madre vino 'I had eaten when my mother came', but in pretérito anterior Hube comido cuando mi madre vino 'I had eaten when my mother would come'. This last form however is rarely used. Sometimes (specially in journalism) the imperfect subjunctive with '-ar' termination can be used with a pluperfect sense in subordinated phrases, but it is neither normative nor recommended.

=== Germanic languages ===
==== Dutch ====
In Dutch, the pluperfect (voltooid verleden tijd) is formed similarly as in German: the past participle (voltooid deelwoord) is combined with the past-tense form of the auxiliary verb hebben or zijn, depending on the full lexical verb: Voordat ik er erg in had, was het al twaalf uur geworden. – Before I noticed, it had become noon already. In addition, pluperfect is sometimes used instead of present perfect: Dat had ik al gezien (voordat jij het zag) – lit.: I had seen that (before you did). The parenthesized part is implied and, therefore, can be omitted.

==== English ====
In English grammar, the pluperfect is formed by combining the auxiliary verb had with the past participle of the main verb, as in had jumped or had written, often used in its contracted form 'd, as in I'd jumped. It is commonly called the past perfect, being a combination of perfect aspect (marked by the use of the have auxiliary with the past participle) and past tense (marked by the use of the past tense of that auxiliary, had). It is one of a number of analogously formed perfect constructions, such as the present perfect ("have/has jumped"), future perfect ("will have jumped") and conditional perfect ("would have jumped").

Unlike the present perfect, the past perfect can readily be used with an adverb specifying a past time frame for the occurrence. For example, it is incorrect to say *I have done it last Friday (the use of last Friday, specifying the past time, would entail the use of the simple past, I did it, rather than the present perfect). However, there is no such objection to a sentence like I had done it last Friday, where the past perfect is accompanied by a specification of the time of occurrence, especially in a context that clearly provides for a connection with another past event, either specified (as in I hadn't met him then.) or implied (as in I hadn't expected that.).

English also has a past perfect progressive (or past perfect continuous) construction, such as had been working. This is the past equivalent of the present perfect progressive, and is used to refer to an ongoing action that continued up to the past time of reference. For example: "It had been raining all night when he awoke." It is also commonly used to refer to actions that had led to consequences in the past (as in I was sleepy because I'd been working all night.).

The past perfect form also has some uses in which it does not directly refer to an actual past event. These are generally in condition clauses and some other dependent clauses referring to hypothetical circumstances (as in "If I'd known about that, I wouldn't have asked."), as well as certain expressions of wish (as in "I wish I hadn't been so stupid back then.").

==== German ====
In German, the pluperfect (German: Plusquamperfekt, Präteritumperfekt, or Vorvergangenheit, lit. 'pre-past') is used in much the same manner, normally in a nachdem sentence. The Plusquamperfekt is formed with the Partizip Perfekt (Partizip II) of the full lexical verb, plus the auxiliary verb haben or sein in its preterite form, depending on the full lexical verb in question.

Nachdem ich aufgestanden war, ging ich ins Badezimmer.
"After I had got up, I went into the bathroom."

When using modal verbs, one can use either the modal verb in the preterite or the auxiliary (haben for all modals):

Es hatte regnen müssen.
"It had to have rained."

Es musste geregnet haben.
"It must pret have rained."

There is a drastic shift of meaning between these variants: the first sentences denote that it "had been necessary" to rain in the past. The second sentence denotes that the speaker assumed that it had rained.

==== Swedish ====
In standard Swedish, the pluperfect (Swedish: pluskvamperfekt) is similar to the pluperfect in a number of other Germanic languages, but with a slightly different word order, and is formed with the preterite form of ha (have in English), i.e. hade (had in English), plus the supine form of the main verb: När jag kom dit hade han gått hem – When I arrived there he had gone home.

=== Slavic languages ===
In some of the Slavic languages the pluperfect has fallen out of use or is rarely used; pluperfect meaning is often expressed using the ordinary past tense, with some adverb (such as "earlier") or other periphrastic construction to indicate prior occurrence.

Ukrainian and Belarusian preserve a distinct pluperfect (давньоминулий час or запрошлы час – davńomynulyj čas or zaprošły čas) that is formed by preceding the verb with buv / bula in Ukrainian and byŭ / była in Belarusian (literally, 'was'). It was and still is used in daily speech, especially in rural areas. Being mostly unused in literature during Soviet times, it is now regaining popularity. For example: Ja vže buv pіšov, až raptom zhadav... (Ukrainian) and Ja ŭžo byŭ pajšoŭ, kali raptam zhadaŭ (Belarusian) I almost had gone already when I recalled...

In Slovenian, the pluperfect (predpreteklik, 'before the past') is formed with the verb 'to be' (biti) in past tense and the participle of the main verb. It is used to denote a completed action in the past before another action (Pred nekaj leti so bile vode poplavile vsa nabrežja Savinje, 'A few years ago, all the banks of Savinja River had been flooded) or, with a modal verb, a past event that should have happened (Moral bi ti bil povedati, 'I should have told you'). Its use is considered archaic and is rarely used even in literary language.

In Polish pluperfect is only found in texts written in or imitating Old Polish, when it was formed with past (perfect) tense of być "to be" and past participle of the main verb. The person marking is movable, e.g. zrobił byłem ~ zrobiłem był "I had done". Past tense of the adjectival verbs (powinienem był zrobić "I should have done") and conditional mood (zrobiłbym był "I would have done") are often wrongly considered pluperfect forms – morphologically, the latter is actually past conditional, rarely used in modern Polish.

In Serbo-Croatian, the pluperfect ("pluskvamperfekt") is constructed with the past tense ("perfekt") of the verb to be ("biti") plus the adjective form of the main verb. Alternatively, it can be formed by using the imperfect ("imperfekt") of "biti" with the past participle of the main verb. For example: "Ja sam bio učio" (or: "Ja bijah učio"), which means, "I had been studying".

In Bulgarian, the pluperfect (минало предварително време) is formed with the imperfect tense of the auxiliary verb съм (to be) and the perfect active participle of the main verb.

=== Celtic languages ===
In Welsh, the pluperfect is formed without an auxiliary verb, usually by interpolating -as- before the simple past ending: parhasem, "we had remained".

In Irish, perfect forms are constructed using the idea of being (or having been) after doing something. In the pluperfect, bhíomar tar éis imeacht, "we had gone", literally, "we were after going".

=== In non-Indo-European languages ===
In Finnish, the pluperfect (pluskvamperfekti) is constructed with an auxiliary verb olla 'to be', which is in the past tense. The primary verbs get the past participle endings -nyt/-nut in singular, -neet in plural forms (the 'n' assimilates with certain consonants) and -ttu/-tty/-tu/-ty in passive forms.\

In Korean, the pluperfect is formed by adding an additional "었". "었" is a morpheme that is analogous to the suffix "ed" in English, in that it is also used to form the simple past tense. Thus

- 먹 = eat (variously conjugated 먹다, 먹어, 먹어요, 먹습니다, etc.)
- 먹었 = ate (variously conjugated 먹었다, 먹었어, 먹었어요, 먹었습니다, etc.)
- 먹었었 = had eaten (variously conjugated 먹었었다, 먹었었어, 먹었었어요, 먹었었습니다, etc.)

In Classical Nahuatl, the pluperfect is formed by adding -ca(h) to the end of the verb; while close to the average meaning of past perfect, it more accurately reflects an action that has been undone by the time of speaking. For example, ōnicochca roughly translates to "I had slept."

== Table of forms ==
English	Tamil	German	Dutch	Afrikaans	Latin	Romanian	Portuguese	Spanish	Italian	French	Greek (Modern)	Bulgarian	Macedonian	Polish (very rare)	Ukrainian	Persian	Pashto	Urdu
I had heard	நான் கேட்டிருந்தேன்	ich hatte gehört	ik had gehoord	ek het gehoor	audīveram	auzisem	(eu) ouvira / tinha ouvido / havia ouvido	había oído / oyera	avevo sentito	j'avais entendu	είχα ακούσει	бях чул	бев слушнал	słyszałem był / słyszałam była	я почув був / почула була	من شنیده بودم	ما اوریدلی وو	میں نے سنا تھا
you had heard (sing.)	நீ கேட்டிருந்தாய்	du hattest gehört	jij had gehoord	jy het gehoor	audīverās	auziseși	(tu) ouviras / tinhas ouvido / havias ouvido	habías oído	avevi sentito	tu avais entendu	είχες ακούσει	бе(ше) чул	беше слушнал	słyszałeś był / słyszałaś była	ти почув був / почула була	تو شنیده بودی	تا اوریدلی وو	تم نے سنا تھا
he/she had heard	அவன்/அவள் கேட்டிருந்தான்/கேட்டிருந்தாள்	er/sie hatte gehört	hij/zij had gehoord	hy/sy het gehoor	audīverat	auzise	(ele/ela) ouvira / tinha ouvido / havia ouvido	había oído	aveva sentito	il/elle avait entendu	είχε ακούσει	бе(ше) чул/-а/-о	беше слушнал/-а/-о	słyszał był / słyszała była	він почув був / вона почула була / воно почуло було	او شنیده بود	هغه/هغی اوریدلی وو	اس نے سنا تھا
we had heard	நாங்கள் கேட்டிருந்தோம்	wir hatten gehört	wij hadden gehoord	ons het gehoor	audīverāmus	auziserăm	(nós) ouvíramos / tínhamos ouvido / havíamos ouvido	habíamos oído	avevamo sentito	nous avions entendu	είχαμε ακούσει	бяхме чули	бевме слушнале	słyszeliśmy byli / słyszałyśmy były	ми почули були	ما شنیده بودیم	مونږ اوریدلی وو	ہم نے سنا تھا
you had heard (pl.)	நீங்கள் கேட்டிருந்தீர்கள்	ihr hattet gehört	jullie hadden gehoord	julle het gehoor	audīverātis	auziserăți	(vós) ouvíreis / tínheis ouvido / havíeis ouvido	habíais oído	avevate sentito	vous aviez entendu	είχατε ακούσει	бяхте чули	бевте слушнале	słyszeliście byli / słyszałyście były	ви почули були	شما شنیده بودید	تاسی اوریدلی وو	آپ نے سنا تھا
they had heard	அவர்கள் கேட்டிருந்தார்கள்	sie hatten gehört	zij hadden gehoord	hulle het gehoor	audīverant	auziseră	(eles) ouviram / tinham ouvido / haviam ouvido	habían oído	avevano sentito	ils/elles avaient entendu	είχαν ακούσει	бяха чули	беа слушнале	słyszeli byli / słyszały były	вони почули були	ایشان شنیده بودند	دوی اوریدلی وو	انہوں نے سنا تھا

== Different perfect construction ==
In German and French there is an additional way to construct a pluperfect by doubling the perfect tense particles. This is called doubled perfect (doppeltes Perfekt) or super perfect (Superperfekt) in German and plus past perfect (temps surcomposé) in French. These forms are not commonly used in written language and they are not taught in school.

Both languages allow to construct a past tense with a modal verb (like English "to have", in German "haben", in French "avoir"), for example "I have heard it". This is largely equivalent to the usage in English. The additional perfect tense is constructed by putting the modal verb ("to have") in the past tense as if being the full verb ("I have had") followed by the actual verb in the past particle mode ("I have had heard it"). The same applies to those verbs which require "to be" (German "sein", French "être") as the modal verb for the construction of the past tense (which would not work in English).

In spoken language in Southern Germany the doubled perfect construction sometimes replaces the Standard German pluperfect construction.

In France it is uncommon in the Northern regions (with Parisian influence) but it can be found widely in Provençal dialects as well as in other regions around the world. In all regions the doubled pluperfect ("I had had heard it") is uncommon although it is possible – all of these forms emphasize the perfect aspect by extending the modal verb so that a doubled pluperfect would add upon the pluperfect in another part of the speech.

German: Ich habe ihm geschrieben gehabt (instead of Ich hatte ihm geschrieben)
German: Ich hatte ihm geschrieben gehabt (the doubled pluperfect emphasis)
French: Il a eu déjeuné (instead of Il avait déjeuné)
French: Il a eu fini de déjeuner (additional emphasis on the perfect aspect)

== See also ==
- Pluperfect progressive
