= Future in the past =

Grammatical tense

The future in the past is a grammatical tense where the time reference is in the future with respect to a vantage point that is itself in the past. In English, future in the past is not always considered a separate tense, but rather as either a subcategory of future or past tense and is typically used in narrations of past events:

John left for the front; he would not return until five years later.

The reference point in the past is established by John left for the front, and it is relative to that point that he would not return is in the future.

The future in the past may also be commonly used for indirect speech (She said she would return), and it often has a modal aspect to its meaning.

Besides English, the future in the past is found in Armenian (ապակատար անցյալ), along with other languages.

== Future perfect in the past ==
A related, and more complex, tense is the future perfect in the past, which is also known as the conditional perfect. Here, an event is situated before a reference point, which in turn is in the future relative to another point in the past:

John left for the front; by the time he should return, the fields would have been burnt to stubble.

Besides English, the future perfect in the past is also found in Bulgarian and Macedonian, where it serves a counterfactual function.

== See also ==
- Prospective aspect

== Bibliography ==
- Comrie, Bernard (1985). Tense. Cambridge Textbooks in Linguistics. Cambridge University Press. pp. 75–78. doi:10.1017/CBO9781139165815. ISBN 9780521281386.
