= List of English irregular verbs =

This is a list of irregular verbs in the English language.

== Past tense irregular verbs ==
For each verb listed, the citation form (the bare infinitive) is given first, with a link to the relevant Wiktionary entry. This is followed by the simple past tense (preterite), and then the past participle. If there are irregular present tense forms (see below), these are given in parentheses after the infinitive. (The present participle and gerund forms of verbs, ending in -ing, are always regular. In English, these are used as verbs, adjectives, and nouns.) In the case of modal verbs the present and preterite forms are listed, since these are the only forms that exist, with the present form identical for all persons.

The right-hand column notes whether the verb is weak or strong and whether it belongs to a subclass, and links to descriptions elsewhere. Information about the development of these verbs generally can be found at English irregular verbs; details of the etymology and usage of specific verbs can be found by consulting Wiktionary.

In some cases, there are two or more possibilities for a given form. In the table, the preferred or more common usage is generally listed first, though for some words the usage is nearly equal for the two choices. Sometimes the usage depends on the dialect. In many cases, such as spell (spelt vs. spelled), learn (learnt vs. learned), and spill (spilt vs. spilled), American English and Canadian English normally use the regular form, while British English, Australian English, New Zealand English and South African English tend to favour the irregular. In other cases, such as dive (dived vs. dove) and sneak (sneaked vs. snuck), the opposite is true. The irregular form tends to indicate duration, whereas the regular form often describes a short-term action (The fire burned for weeks. vs. He burnt his finger.), and in American English, the regular form is associated with the literal sense of a verb, while the irregular form with a figurative one.

The preterite and past participle forms of irregular verbs follow certain patterns. These include ending in -t (e.g. build, bend, send), stem changes (whether it is a vowel, such as in sit, win or hold, or a consonant, such as in teach and seek, that changes), or adding the [n] suffix to the past participle form (e.g. drive, show, rise). English irregular verbs are now a closed group, which means that newly formed verbs are always regular and do not adopt any of the irregular patterns.

This list contains only those verb forms which are listed in the major dictionaries as being standard usage in modern English. There are also many thousands of archaic, non-standard and dialect variants. Modern English still has remnants of formerly irregular verbs in other parts of speech. Most obviously, adjectives like misshapen, beholden, or forlorn fossilize what were originally the past participles of the verbs shape and behold, and Old English forleosan. However, forleosan has fallen out of use and shape is now regular, so these verbs are not listed, and behold, while still irregular, can no longer be listed this participle form.

Verb forms	Verb class	Notes
be (am, is, are) – was, were – been	Suppletive	See Indo-European copula
bear – bore – borne/born forbear – forbore/forbare – forborne/forborn overbear – overbore/overbare – overborne/overborn underbear – underbore/underbare – underborne/underborn	Strong, class 4	The spelling born is used in passive or adjectival contexts relating to birth.
beat – beat – beaten/beat browbeat – browbeat – browbeaten/browbeat overbeat – overbeat – overbeaten/overbeat	Strong, class 7	
become – became – become misbecome – misbecame – misbecome	Strong, class 4	
beget – begot/begat – begot/begotten misbeget – misbegot/misbegat – misbegotten/misbegot	Strong, class 5	
begin – began – begun	Strong, class 3	
bend – bent – bent overbend – overbent – overbent unbend – unbent – unbent	Weak, class 1	With coalescence of dentals and devoiced ending
beseech – beseeched/besought – beseeched/besought	Regular	Originally weak, class 1, subclass (ii) with Rückumlaut and Germanic spirant law
bet – bet/betted – bet/betted underbet – underbet/underbetted – underbet/underbetted	Weak	With coalescence of dentals
beware – (no other forms)	Defective	Formed from be with predicate adjective, used as infinitive, imperative and subjunctive only. Inflected forms (bewares, bewared, bewaring) are considered obsolete.
bid [in auctions etc.] – bid – bid outbid – outbid – outbid overbid – overbid – overbid rebid – rebid – rebid underbid – underbid – underbid	Weak	With coalescence of dentals
bid [meaning to request or say] – bid/bade – bid/bidden	Strong, class 5	
bide – bided/bode – bided/bidden	Strong, class 1	
bind – bound – bound unbind – unbound – unbound	Strong, class 3	
bite – bit – bitten	Strong, class 1	
bleed – bled – bled	Weak, class 1	With coalescence of dentals and vowel shortening
blend – blent/blended – blent/blended	Weak	Regular or with devoiced ending
bless – blessed/blest – blessed/blest	Weak	Regular with alternative (archaic) spelling
blow – blew – blown overblow – overblew – overblown	Strong, class 7	
break – broke – broken outbreak – outbroke – outbroken rebreak – rebroke – rebroken	Strong, class 4	
breed – bred – bred inbreed – inbred – inbred interbreed – interbred – interbred overbreed – overbred – overbred	Weak, class 1	With coalescence of dentals and vowel shortening
bring – brought – brought	Weak, class 1, subclass (i)	The past and past participle show the effects of the Germanic spirant law. The present form descends originally from a separate strong verb built on the same root.
build – built – built overbuild – overbuilt – overbuilt rebuild – rebuilt – rebuilt underbuild – underbuilt – underbuilt	Weak, class 1	With coalescence of dentals and devoiced ending
burn – burned/burnt – burned/burnt sunburn – sunburned/sunburnt – sunburned/sunburnt	Weak	Regular or with devoiced ending
burst – burst – burst	Strong, class 3	
bust – busted/bust – busted/bust	Strong, class 3	Or regular
buy – bought – bought overbuy – overbought – overbought underbuy – underbought – underbought	Weak, class 1, subclass (ii)	With Rückumlaut and Germanic spirant law
can [auxiliary verb] – could – (none)	Preterite-present	Defective; see English modal verbs
cast – cast – cast broadcast – broadcast – broadcast downcast – downcast – downcast forecast – forecast – forecast miscast – miscast – miscast overcast – overcast – overcast podcast – podcast – podcast precast – precast – precast recast – recast – recast simulcast – simulcast – simulcast telecast – telecast – telecast typecast – typecast – typecast undercast – undercast – undercast upcast – upcast – upcast webcast – webcast – webcast	Weak	Old Norse loanword with coalescence of dentals. Many of the prefixed forms can also take -ed.
catch – caught – caught	Weak	French loanword conjugated perhaps by analogy with teach–taught; regular forms are now dialectal
chide – chode/chid/chided – chidden/chid/chided	Strong, class 1	Or regular
choose – chose – chosen mischoose – mischose – mischosen	Strong, class 2	
clad – clad – clad		Developed from clad, the past form of clothe (see below)
cleave [meaning to split] – cleft/clove/cleaved – cleft/cloven/cleaved	Strong, class 2	Or weak with vowel shortening; regular when meaning "adhere"
cling – clung – clung	Strong, class 3	
clothe – clad/clothed – clad/clothed overclothe – overclad/overclothed – overclad/overclothed unclothe – unclad/unclothed – unclad/unclothed underclothe – underclad/underclothed – underclad/underclothed	Weak	The regular clothed is from OE claþian, while clad (weak with coalescence of dentals) is from OE clæþan (both OE verbs having similar meaning)
comb – combed – combed/kempt		
come – came – come forthcome – forthcame – forthcome overcome – overcame – overcome (see also under become)	Strong, class 4	
cost [intransitive sense] – cost/costed – cost/costed	Weak	French loanword with coalescence of dentals; regular when meaning "calculate the cost of"
creep – crept/creeped – crept/creeped	Weak	With vowel shortening (or regular); originally strong, class 2
cut – cut – cut clearcut – clearcut – clearcut crosscut – crosscut – crosscut intercut – intercut – intercut recut – recut – recut undercut – undercut – undercut	Weak	With coalescence of dentals
dare (dares/dare) – dared/durst/dare – dared/durst	Preterite-present	Now most often regular except in the use of dare in place of dares in some contexts; see English modal verbs
deal – dealt – dealt misdeal – misdealt – misdealt redeal – redealt – redealt	Weak, class 1	With vowel shortening and devoiced ending
dig – dug – dug underdig – underdug – underdug		Past form dug developed by analogy with stick–stuck; originally weak
dive – dived/dove – dived/dove	Weak	The alternative dove (found mainly in American usage) arose by analogy with strong verbs
do (does /dʌz/) – did – done bedo (bedoes) – bedid – bedone misdo (misdoes) – misdid – misdone outdo (outdoes) – outdid – outdone overdo (overdoes) – overdid – overdone redo (redoes) – redid – redone underdo (underdoes) – underdid – underdone undo (undoes) – undid – undone	Irregular since Proto-Germanic	Past tense formed by reduplication; past participle from Old English gedon; related to deed
dow – dowed/dought – dowed/dought		Related to doughty
draw – drew – drawn bedraw – bedrew – bedrawn downdraw – downdrew – downdrawn outdraw – outdrew – outdrawn overdraw – overdrew – overdrawn redraw – redrew – redrawn underdraw – underdrew – underdrawn updraw – updrew – updrawn withdraw – withdrew – withdrawn	Strong, class 6	Related to draft/draught
dream – dreamed/dreamt – dreamed/dreamt bedream – bedreamed/bedreamt – bedreamed/bedreamt	Weak	With vowel shortening and devoiced ending (or regular)
dress – dressed/drest – dressed/drest	Weak	With alternative (archaic) spelling
drink – drank – drunk	Strong, class 3	Related to drench
drive – drove – driven bedrive – bedrove – bedriven overdrive – overdrove – overdriven test-drive – test-drove – test-driven underdrive – underdrove – underdriven	Strong, class 1	Related to drift
dwell – dwelt/dwelled – dwelt/dwelled bedwell – bedwelt/bedwelled – bedwelt/bedwelled outdwell – outdwelt/outdwelled – outdwelt/outdwelled	Weak, class 1	With devoiced ending (or regular)
earn – earned/earnt – earned/earnt	Weak, class 2	With devoiced ending (or regular)
eat – ate – eaten forfret – forfretted – forfretted/forfretten fret – fretted/frate – fretted/fretten outeat – outate – outeaten overeat – overate – overeaten undereat – underate – undereaten	Strong, class 5	Past tense usually /eɪt/ though sometimes /ɛt/ in British English
fall – fell – fallen befall – befell – befallen	Strong, class 7	
feed – fed – fed bottle-feed – bottle-fed – bottle-fed breastfeed – breastfed – breastfed force-feed – force-fed – force-fed hand-feed – hand-fed – hand-fed misfeed – misfed – misfed overfeed – overfed – overfed self-feed – self-fed – self-fed spoon-feed – spoon-fed – spoon-fed underfeed – underfed – underfed	Weak, class 1	With coalescence of dentals and vowel shortening
feel – felt – felt forefeel – forefelt – forefelt	Weak, class 1	With devoiced ending and vowel shortening
fight – fought – fought befight – befought – befought outfight – outfought – outfought	Strong, class 3	
find – found – found refind – refound – refound	Strong, class 3	
fit – fitted/fit – fitted/fit misfit – misfitted/misfit – misfitted/misfit	Weak	With coalescence of dentals
flee – fled – fled	Weak	With vowel shortening; originally strong, class 2
fling – flung – flung	Strong, class 3	By analogy
fly – flew – flown outfly – outflew – outflown overfly – overflew – overflown test-fly – test-flew – test-flown	Strong, class 2	Regular when meaning "hitting a fly ball in baseball"
forbid – forbid/forbade/forbad – forbidden	Strong, class 5	
forget – forgot – forgotten	Strong, class 5	
forsake – forsook – forsaken	Strong, class 6	
freeze – froze – frozen quick-freeze – quick-froze – quick-frozen refreeze – refroze – refrozen unfreeze – unfroze – unfrozen	Strong, class 2	
get – got – got/gotten beget – begot/begat – begot/begotten forget – forgot – forgotten	Strong, class 5	Past participle is got in British usage (except in fossilized phrases such as "ill-gotten"), and gotten in American (but see have got)
gild – gilded/gilt – gilded/gilt	Weak, class 1	With coalescence of dentals and devoiced ending (or regular)
gird - girded/girt - girded/girt	Weak, class 1	With coalescence of dentals and devoiced ending (or regular)
give – gave – given forgive – forgave – forgiven misgive – misgave – misgiven overgive – overgave – overgiven	Strong, class 5	
glide – glided/glid – glided/glid/glidden	Regular	Originally strong, class 1
go – went – gone forego – forewent – foregone forgo – forwent – forgone undergo – underwent – undergone	Suppletive	See go
grind – ground – ground	Strong, class 3	
grow – grew – grown outgrow – outgrew – outgrown overgrow – overgrew – overgrown regrow – regrew – regrown	Strong, class 7	
hang – hung/hanged – hung/hanged overhang – overhung – overhung	Strong, class 7	Regularized alternative hanged was influenced by OE causative hangian, and is used chiefly for hanging as a means of execution
have (has) – had – had	Weak	Had results from contraction, from OE hæfde; third person present has also results from contraction
hear – heard – heard behear – beheard – beheard forehear – foreheard – foreheard mishear – misheard – misheard outhear – outheard – outheard overhear – overheard – overheard rehear – reheard – reheard unhear – unheard – unheard	Weak, class 1	Originally with vowel shortening (the modern pronunciation of heard in RP has the long vowel /ɜː/)
help – helped/holp – helped/holpen	Regular	Originally strong, class 3
hew – hewed – hewed/hewn	Strong, class 7	Or regular
hide – hid – hidden	Weak	With vowel shortening and coalescence of dentals; influenced by strong verbs
hit – hit – hit mishit – mishit – mishit overhit – overhit – overhit underhit – underhit – underhit	Weak	With coalescence of dentals
hoist – hoisted/hoist – hoisted/hoist	Weak	Hoist was originally the past form of the now archaic verb hoise
hold – held – held behold – beheld – beheld uphold – upheld – upheld withhold – withheld – withheld	Strong, class 7	
hurt – hurt – hurt	Weak	French loanword with coalescence of dentals
keep – kept – kept miskeep – miskept – miskept overkeep – overkept – overkept underkeep – underkept – underkept	Weak, class 1	With vowel shortening
ken – kenned/kent – kenned/kent beken – bekenned/bekent – bekenned/bekent foreken – forekenned/forekent – forekenned/forekent misken – miskenned/miskent – miskenned/miskent outken – outkenned/outkent – outkenned/outkent	Weak, class 1	With devoiced ending (or regular); Northern England English and Scottish dialect word
kneel – knelt/kneeled – knelt/kneeled	Weak, class 2	With vowel shortening and devoiced ending (or regular)
knit – knit/knitted – knit/knitted beknit – beknit/beknitted – beknit/beknitted hand-knit – hand-knit/hand-knitted – hand-knit/hand-knitted	Weak, class 1	With coalescence of dentals (or regular); related to knot
know – knew – known	Strong, class 7	
lade – laded – laden/laded overlade – overladed – overladen/overladed	Strong, class 6	Or regular; past participle laden is common adjectivally
lay – laid – laid belay – belaid – belaid inlay – inlaid – inlaid mislay – mislaid – mislaid overlay – overlaid – overlaid waylay – waylaid – waylaid	Weak	Irregular in spelling only
lead – led – led mislead – misled – misled offlead – offled – offled onlead – onled – onled outlead – outled – outled overlead – overled – overled underlead – underled – underled	Weak, class 1	With coalescence of dentals and vowel shortening
lean – leaned/leant – leaned/leant	Weak, class 2	With devoiced ending and vowel shortening (or regular)
leap – leaped/leapt – leaped/leapt	Weak	With vowel shortening (or regular); originally strong, class 7
learn – learned/learnt – learned/learnt mislearn – mislearned/mislearnt – mislearned/mislearnt overlearn – overlearned/overlearnt – overlearned/overlearnt relearn – relearned/relearnt – relearned/relearnt unlearn – unlearned/unlearnt – unlearned/unlearnt	Weak, class 2	With devoiced ending (or regular)
leave – left – left	Weak, class 1	With devoiced ending and vowel shortening
lend – lent – lent	Weak	With coalescence of dentals and devoiced ending
let – let – let sublet – sublet – sublet underlet – underlet – underlet	Strong, class 7	
lie – lay – lain overlie – overlay – overlain underlie – underlay – underlain	Strong, class 5	Regular when meaning "tell an untruth"
light – lit/lighted – lit/lighted alight – alit/alighted – alit/alighted backlight – backlit/backlighted – backlit/backlighted green-light – green-lit/green-lighted – green-lit/green-lighted relight – relit/relighted – relit/relighted	Weak, class 1	With coalescence of dentals and vowel shortening (or regular)
lose – lost – lost	Weak, class 2	With devoiced ending and vowel shortening
make – made – made remake – remade – remade unmake – unmade – unmade	Weak	Made formed by contraction from "maked"
may – might – (none)	Preterite-present	Defective; see English modal verbs
mean – meant – meant	Weak, class 1	With devoiced ending and vowel shortening
meet – met – met	Weak, class 1	With coalescence of dentals and vowel shortening
melt – melted – melted/molten	Strong, class 3	Regular, but molten survives in adjectival use
mix – mixed/mixt – mixed/mixt	Weak	Regular with alternative (mostly archaic) spelling
mow – mowed – mowed/mown	Strong, class 7	Regular in past tense and sometimes in past participle.
must – (no other forms)	Defective	Originally a preterite; see English modal verbs
need (needs/need) – needed – needed	Weak	Regular except in the use of need in place of needs in some contexts, by analogy with can, must, etc.; see English modal verbs
ought – (no other forms)	Defective	Originally a preterite; see English modal verbs
pay – paid – paid overpay – overpaid – overpaid prepay – prepaid – prepaid repay – repaid – repaid underpay – underpaid – underpaid	Weak	Irregular in spelling only.
pen – penned/pent – penned/pent	Weak	With devoiced ending, but usually regular; pent is sometimes used when the verb has the meaning "to enclose", and mainly adjectivally
plead – pled/pleaded – pled/pleaded	Weak	French loanword with coalescence of dentals and vowel shortening.
prove – proved – proved/proven reprove – reproved – reproved/reproven	Weak	French loanword with the alternative past participle proven by analogy with some strong verbs
put – put – put input – input – input output – output – output	Weak	With coalescence of dentals
bequeath – bequeathed/bequethed/bequoth/bequod – bequeathed/bequethed/bequoth/bequethen	Strong, class 5	Past tense quoth is literary or archaic; other parts of that verb are obsolete; bequeath is normally regularized in -ed
quit – quit/quitted – quit/quitted	Weak	French loanword with coalescence of dentals (or regular)
read /riːd/ – read /rɛd/ – read /rɛd/ lipread – lipread – lipread misread – misread – misread proofread – proofread – proofread reread – reread – reread sight-read – sight-read – sight-read	Weak, class 1	With coalescence of dentals and vowel shortening
reave – reaved/reft – reaved/reft bereave – bereaved/bereft – bereaved/bereft	Weak, class 2	With devoiced ending and vowel shortening; the verb bereave is usually regular, but bereft survives as past participle, with distinct meanings
rend – rent – rent	Weak, class 1	With coalescence of dentals and devoiced ending
rid – rid/ridded – rid/ridden/ridded	Weak	With coalescence of dentals, or regular; ridden by analogy with strong verbs
ride – rode – ridden outride – outrode – outridden override – overrode – overridden	Strong, class 1	
ring – rang – rung	Strong, class 3	By analogy; regular when meaning "surround", etc.
rise – rose – risen arise – arose – arisen uprise – uprose – uprisen	Strong, class 1	
rive – rived/rove – rived/riven	Strong class 1	From Old Norse; later regularized; now rarely used
run – ran – run outrun – outran – outrun overrun – overran – overrun rerun – reran – rerun speedrun – speedran – speedrun underrun – underran – underrun	Strong, class 3	
saw – sawed – sawed/sawn	Weak	Sawn by analogy with strong verbs
say (says /sɛz/) – said – said missay – missaid – missaid soothsay – soothsaid – soothsaid	Weak	With vowel shortening in said /sɛd/ and in the third person present says /sɛz/
see – saw – seen foresee – foresaw – foreseen missee – missaw – misseen oversee – oversaw – overseen sightsee – sightsaw – sightseen undersee – undersaw – underseen	Strong, class 5	
seek – sought – sought beseek – besought – besought	Weak, class 1, subclass (ii)	With Rückumlaut and Germanic spirant law
sell – sold – sold outsell – outsold – outsold oversell – oversold – oversold resell – resold – resold undersell – undersold – undersold upsell – upsold – upsold	Weak, class 1, subclass (ii)	With Rückumlaut; related to sale
send – sent – sent missend – missent – missent resend – resent – resent	Weak, class 1	With coalescence of dentals
set – set – set beset – beset – beset offset – offset – offset preset – preset – preset reset – reset – reset upset – upset – upset	Weak, class 1	With coalescence of dentals
sew – sewed – sewn/sewed handsew – handsewed – handsewn/handsewed oversew – oversewed – oversewn/oversewed	Weak	Sewn by analogy with strong verbs
shake – shook – shaken overshake – overshook – overshaken	Strong, class 6	
shall – should – (none)	Preterite-present	Defective; see English modal verbs, and shall and will
shave – shaved – shaved/shaven	Strong, class 6	Now often regularized in past tense and sometimes in past participle
shear – sheared/shore – shorn/sheared	Strong, class 4	Or regular
shed – shed – shed	Strong, class 7	
shine – shone/shined – shone/shined	Strong, class 1	
shit – shit/shitted/shat – shit/shitted/shat shite – shited/shit – shited/shit	Strong, class 1	The form shite is chiefly Scottish and Irish.
shoe – shod/shoed – shodden/shod/shoed reshoe – reshod/reshoed – reshodden/reshod/reshoed	Weak	With vowel shortening (or regular); shodden by analogy with strong verbs
shoot – shot – shot misshoot – misshot – misshot overshoot – overshot – overshot reshoot – reshot – reshot undershoot – undershot – undershot	Strong, class 2	
show – showed – shown/showed reshow – reshowed – reshown	Weak	With participle shown perhaps by analogy with sown (from sow)
shrink – shrank/shrunk – shrunk/shrunken overshrink – overshrank/overshrunk – overshrunk/overshrunken	Strong, class 3	Shrunken is mostly used adjectivally
shrive – shrove/shrived – shriven/shrived	Strong, class 1	
shut – shut – shut reshut – reshut – reshut	Weak, class 1	With coalescence of dentals
sing – sang – sung resing – resang – resung	Strong, class 3	
sink – sank/sunk – sunk/sunken	Strong, class 3	The form sunken appears in some adjectival uses
sit – sat – sat babysit – babysat – babysat housesit – housesat – housesat resit – resat – resat	Strong, class 5	
slay – slew/slayed – slain/slayed	Strong, class 6	Or regular
sleep – slept – slept oversleep – overslept – overslept undersleep – underslept – underslept	Weak	With vowel shortening; originally strong, class 7
slide – slid – slid/slidden backslide – backslid – backslid/backslidden overslide – overslid – overslid/overslidden	Strong, class 1	
sling – slung – slung	Strong, class 3	
slink – slunk/slinked/slank – slunk/slinked/slank	Strong, class 3	
slit – slit – slit/slitten	Strong, class 1	
smell – smelled/smelt – smelled/smelt	Weak	With devoiced ending (or regular)
smite – smote/smit – smitten/smitted	Strong, class 1	Largely archaic; smitten is quite commonly used adjectivally
sneak – sneaked/snuck – sneaked/snuck	Weak	Alternative form snuck (chiefly American) by analogy with strong verbs
sow – sowed – sown/sowed	Strong, class 7	With weak past tense sowed
speak – spoke – spoken bespeak – bespoke – bespoken *forespeak – forespoke – forespoken *forspeak – forspoke – forspoken misspeak – misspoke – misspoken	Strong, class 5	
speed – sped/speeded – sped/speeded	Weak, class 1	With vowel shortening and coalescence of dentals (or regular)
spell – spelled/spelt – spelled/spelt misspell – misspelled/misspelt – misspelled/misspelt	Weak	With devoiced ending (or regular)
spend – spent – spent misspend – misspent – misspent outspend – outspent – outspent overspend – overspent – overspent	Weak, class 1	With coalescence of dentals
spill – spilled/spilt – spilled/spilt overspill – overspilled/overspilt – overspilled/overspilt	Weak, class 1	With devoiced ending (or regular)
spin – spun/span – spun outspin – outspun/outspan – outspun	Strong, class 3	
spit – spat/spit – spat/spit	Weak	With coalescence of dentals (for past form spit, which is common in America), or spat by analogy with strong verbs; regular when meaning "of roast on a spit"
split – split – split	Weak	With coalescence of dentals
spoil – spoiled/spoilt – spoiled/spoilt	Weak	French loanword with devoiced ending (or regular)
spread – spread – spread outspread – outspread – outspread overspread – overspread – overspread underspread – underspread – underspread	Weak, class 1	With coalescence of dentals
spring – sprang/sprung – sprung/*sprang handspring – handsprang/handsprung – handsprung/*handsprang	Strong, class 3	
stand – stood – stood forstand – forstood – forstood misunderstand – misunderstood – misunderstood overstand – overstood – overstood understand – understood – understood upstand – upstood – upstood withstand – withstood – withstood	Strong, class 6	
stave – stove/staved – stove/staved/stoven	Weak	Irregular forms developed by analogy with strong verbs
steal – stole – stolen	Strong, class 4	
stick – stuck – stuck	Weak	Irregular forms developed by analogy with strong, class 3
sting – stang/stung – stung	Strong, class 3	
stink – stank/stunk – stunk	Strong, class 3	
strew – strewed – strewn/strewed bestrew – bestrewed – bestrewn/bestrewed overstrew – overstrewed – overstrewn/overstrewed	Weak	Irregular forms developed by analogy with strong verbs
stride – strode – stridden bestride – bestrode – bestridden outstride – outstrode – outstridden overstride – overstrode – overstridden	Strong, class 1	
strike – struck – struck/stricken overstrike – overstruck – overstruck/overstricken	Strong, class 1	The form stricken is limited to certain adjectival and specialist uses
string – strung/*stringed – strung/*stringed hamstring – hamstrung/*hamstringed – hamstrung/*hamstringed overstring – overstrung/*overstringed – overstrung/*overstringed	Weak	Irregular forms developed by analogy with strong verbs
strive – strove/strived – striven/strived outstrive – outstrove – outstriven overstrive – overstrove – overstriven	Strong, class 1	Or regularized
swear – swore – sworn forswear – forswore – forsworn outswear – outswore – outsworn	Strong, class 6	
sweat – sweated/sweat – sweated/sweat	Weak, class 1	Usually regular; possible past form sweat with coalescence of dentals
sweep – swept – swept upsweep – upswept – upswept	Weak, class 1	With vowel shortening; replaced OE strong class 7 verb swápan, with the same meaning, but the form is not a regular development from it
swell – swelled/swole – swollen/swelled	Strong, class 3	With regularized forms
swim – swam/*swum – swum outswim – outswam/*outswum – outswum	Strong, class 3	
swing – swang/swung – swung overswing – overswang/overswung – overswung	Strong, class 3	
take – took – taken betake – betook – betaken mistake – mistook – mistaken overtake – overtook – overtaken partake – partook – partaken retake – retook – retaken undertake – undertook – undertaken *uptake – uptook – uptaken *withtake – withtook – withtaken	Strong, class 6	
teach – taught – taught	Weak, class 1, subclass (ii)	With Rückumlaut and Germanic spirant law
tear – tore – torn uptear – uptore – uptorn	Strong, class 4	
tell – told – told foretell – foretold – foretold forthtell – forthtold – forthtold mistell – mistold – mistold	Weak, class 1, subclass (ii)	With Rückumlaut; related to tale
think – thought – thought outthink – outthought – outthought rethink – rethought – rethought	Weak, class 1, subclass (ii)	With Rückumlaut and Germanic spirant law
thrive – throve/thrived/*thrave – thriven/thrived	Strong class 1	Of Old Norse origin (now archaic) or weak (regular) pattern
throw – threw – thrown outthrow – outthrew – outthrown overthrow – overthrew – overthrown underthrow – underthrew – underthrown upthrow – upthrew – upthrown	Strong, class 7	
thrust – thrust/*thrusted – thrust/*thrusted outthrust – outthrust – outthrust	Weak	With coalescence of dentals (or regular)
tread – trod – trodden/trod retread – retrod/*retread/*retreaded/*retrodden – retrodden/retrod/*retread/*retreaded	Strong, class 5	Or regular
vex – vexed/vext – vexed/vext	Regular	With alternative (archaic) spelling
wake – woke/waked – woken/waked awake – awoke – awoken	Strong, class 6	
wear – weared/wore – weared/worn outwear – outweared/outwore – outweared/outworn overwear – overweared/overwore – overweared/overworn	Weak, class 1	Fell into a strong pattern by analogy with bear
weave – wove – woven interweave – interwove – interwoven	Strong, class 7	
wed – wed/wedded – wed/wedded miswed – miswed/miswedded – miswed/miswedded rewed – rewed/rewedded – rewed/rewedded	Weak, class 2	With coalescence of dentals (or regular)
weep – wept/weeped – wept/weeped	Weak	With vowel shortening (or regular); originally strong, class 7
wend – wended/went – wended/went	Weak, class 1	Originally with coalescence of dentals and devoiced ending, but now regular; went is used as the past of go
wet – wet/wetted – wet/wetted overwet – overwet/overwetted – overwet/overwetted	Weak, class 1	With coalescence of dentals (or regular)
will – would – (none)	Preterite-present	Defective; see English modal verbs, and shall and will; in non-auxiliary uses the verb is regular
win – won – won	Strong, class 3	
wind /waɪnd/ – wound – wound rewind – rewound – rewound unwind – unwound – unwound	Strong, class 3	The identically spelt verb wind /wɪnd/, with meanings connected with air flow and breathlessness, is regular
work – worked/wrought – worked/wrought	Weak	Now regular, formerly with Rückumlaut and metathesis of r and o
wreak – wreaked/wrought – wreaked/wrought	Weak	Usually regular; wrought (which is in fact from work) has come sometimes to be identified with this verb (perhaps by analogy with seek–sought).
wring – wrang/wrung – wrung	Strong, class 3	
write – wrote – written cowrite – cowrote – cowritten ghostwrite – ghostwrote – ghostwritten handwrite – handwrote – handwritten miswrite – miswrote – miswritten overwrite – overwrote – overwritten rewrite – rewrote – rewritten underwrite – underwrote – underwritten	Strong, class 1	
writhe – writhed/wrothe – writhed/writhen	Regular	Originally strong, class 1
zinc – zinced/zinked/zincked – zinced/zinked/zincked	Regular	With spelling complications because of the final letter C

== Present tense irregular verbs ==
Though the list of verbs irregular in the preterite or past participle is long, the list of irregular present tense verbs is very short. Excepting modal verbs like "shall", "will", and "can" that do not inflect at all in the present tense, there are only four of them, not counting compounds including them:

- be: I am, thou art, you are, he is, we are, they are. The contracted/reduced forms, used in unstressed positions and in particular as auxiliary verbs, are as follows: I’m, you’re, he’s, we’re, they’re.
- do (and compounds such as undo and redo): I do, you do, he does, we do, they do, where "does" is pronounced /ˈdʌz/ (instead of /ˈduːz/), in contrast to the /ˈduː/ used for the infinitive and the other present tense forms. The reduced forms of the verb do are pronounced /du/, /də/, /d/, or /dəz/, /dz/ for does and usually appear only in questions. The contracted forms of do are used only in the negative: I do not = I don't, you do not = you don't, he does not = he doesn't, we do not = we don't, they do not = they don't.
- have: I have, you have, he has, we have, they have. If used as an auxiliary verb in the present perfect, past perfect or future perfect, its contracted forms can be used: I’ve, you’ve, he’s, we’ve, they’ve.
- say (and compounds such as gainsay and naysay): I say, you say, he says, we say, they say, where "says" has the standard pronunciation /sɛz/ (instead of /seɪz/), in contrast to the /seɪ/ used for the infinitive and other present tense forms.
