= Go (verb) =

English verb

The verb go is an irregular verb in the English language (see English irregular verbs). It has a wide range of uses; its basic meaning is "to move from one place to another". Apart from the copular verb be, the verb go is the only English verb to have a suppletive past tense, namely went.

== Principal parts ==
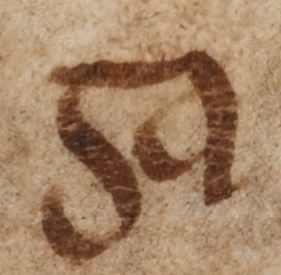
'Ga,' one of the Old English forms of 'go'

The principal parts of go are go, went, gone. In other respects, the modern English verb conjugates regularly. The irregularity of the principal parts is due to their disparate origin in definitely two and possibly three distinct Indo-European roots.

Unlike every other English verb except be, the preterite (simple past tense) of go is not etymologically related to its infinitive. Instead, the preterite of go, went, descends from a variant of the preterite of wend, the descendant of Old English wendan and Middle English wenden. Old English wendan (modern wend) and gān (mod. go) shared semantic similarities. The similarities are evident in the sentence "I'm wending my way home", which is equivalent to "I'm going home".

== Etymology ==
Go descends from Middle English gon, goon, from Old English gān, from Proto-Germanic *gāną, from Proto-Indo-European (PIE) *ǵʰēh₁- 'to go, leave'. Cognates in the Germanic languages include West Frisian gean, Dutch gaan, Low German gahn, German gehen, Danish, Norwegian, Swedish gå, Crimean Gothic geen.

=== Origin of ēode ===
Old English did not use any variation of went for the general preterite of go; instead, the word ēode (variant ġeēode) was used, which lingered on as the now obsolete yede, yode and yead.

Old English ēode 'he went' (plural ēodon) is made up of a defective preterite base ēo- and the weak dental suffix -de} common in most modern English past tense forms (cf. ache : ached). The base ēo- and its Gothic counterpart iddja (pl. iddjedun) show the following development:

- PIE perfect singular *ye-yóh₂- (singular) → *ijō-dē → *eōdæ → ēode
- PIE perfect plural *ye-yh₂- (plural) → *jejj- (Holtzmann's law) → *jijj- (i-mutation) → Proto-Germanic *ijjēdun- → Gothic iddjēdun.

Both forms are derived from the PIE root *h₁y-éh₂- (late *yeh₂-) based on close matches with past tense forms of Sanskrit yā́ti 'he goes, travels' (cf. imperfect áyāt, perfect yayáu, and aorist áyāsam). The root is regarded as an iterative-intensive derivative of the more common *h₁ey- 'to go' (present *h₁éyti). One reflex of *h₁ey- is Latin īre 'to go' (present eō 'I go') which gave many English words such as ambition, exit, introit, issue, preterite, and so forth. It is also found in the Slavic languages as *iti and similar forms.

=== Development of a new preterite ===
In Middle English, ēode evolved into ȝede, yede, and yode. By the 15th century in southern England, wende (wend) had become synonymous with go, but its infinitive and present tense forms had ceased to be in frequent use. This was also true of the various ēode-derived preterites of go, thus a variant preterite of wend absorbed the function. After went became established as the preterite of go, wend took on a new preterite, wended. In Northern English and Scots, yede was gaed, regularly formed by suffixing -ed to a variant of go. Due to the influence of the region, southern English forms constitute the standard language of England, and so went is the standard English preterite. Spencer used yede to mean go with yode as its preterite form but as dialect.

=== Origin of went ===
Went, the modern past tense of go, was originally the preterite form of Middle English 'to turn, direct; depart' (modern English wend), from Old English wendan (past wende, ġewend), itself from Proto-Germanic *wandijaną 'to turn' (transitive). Cognates include West Frisian weine, Dutch, Low German, German wenden, Yiddish ווענדן (vendn), Swedish vända, Danish, Norwegian vende, and Gothic wandjan. The original forms of the ME past tense were wende, wended (our modern form), and past participle wend, but variant wente developed from about 1200. By ca. 1500, wended had prevailed in the transitive senses, whereas wente, restricted to intransitive senses, rivalled and replaced go's older past tense, yede/yode.

Proto-Germanic *wandijaną is a causative derivative of *windaną 'to wind, wrap', from which the modern English verb wind developed. Cognates include West Frisian wine, Dutch, Low German, German winden, Swedish vinda, Danish and Norwegian vinde, and Gothic -windan (in biwindan 'to wind around, wrap'). PGmc *windaną comes from Proto-Indo-European *wendʰ- 'to wind, twist', which also gave Umbrian preuenda 'turn!' (imperative), Tocharian A/B wänt/wänträ 'covers, envelops', Greek (Hesychius) áthras 'wagon', Armenian gind 'ring', and Sanskrit vandhúra 'carriage framework'.

=== Summary of the main Proto-Indo-European roots ===
Go is historically derived from at least three Proto-Indo-European roots: *ǵʰēh₁, the source of go and gone (← ME gon, ygon ← OE ġegān); *h₁ei, the source of ēode; and *u̯endʰ, the source of went as well as wend and wind. Only two roots are continually used in their modern English reflexes go/gone and went.

== Suppletion in other Germanic languages ==
The Dutch, Low German, German, and Scandinavian verbs cognate to go, e.g. Dutch gaan, Low German gahn, German gehen, and Danish/Norwegian/Swedish gå, also have suppletive past forms, namely the preterite ging of Dutch and German, güng of Low German, gick (from the same source) of Danish, Norwegian and Swedish, and the past participle gegangen of German. These forms are relics from earlier, more widespread words that meant 'to walk, go' and which survive sporadically in Scots gang, East Frisian gunge, and Icelandic ganga. Some obsolete cognates include Middle Low German, Middle High German gangen, early modern Swedish gånga, and Gothic gaggan. These are reflexes of Proto-Germanic *ganganą, from Proto-Indo-European *ǵʰengʰ- 'to step', which also gave Lithuanian žeñgti 'to stride', Greek kochōnē 'perineum', Avestan zanga 'ankle', and Sanskrit jáṁhas 'step', jaṅghā 'shank'.

Therefore, the case of English go is not unique among the Germanic languages, and it would appear that most have in a like manner reproduced equivalent suppletive conjugations for their words for 'to go', suggesting a cyclical change patterned after the state of affairs in Proto-Germanic.

== Phrasal forms ==
The verb may be combined with various prepositions to form phrasal verbs such as "go around" and "go off".

The verb go is used to form the going to future, in sentences like "I'm going to finish my work today."

== Perfect forms ==
In perfect forms of the verb (have gone, had gone, etc.) the past participle gone is often replaced by that of be, namely been. For example:

- He's been to the shops. (He went and returned)
- He's gone to the shops. (He went and has not returned)

For details of this usage, see have been.
