= English irregular verbs =

Verbs with less common conjugations in English

As a Germanic language, the English language has many irregular verbs, overwhelmingly of Germanic origin, except for some words such as catch, approaching 200 in normal use – and significantly more if prefixed forms are counted. In most cases, the irregularity concerns the past tense (also called preterite) or the past participle. The other inflected parts of the verb – the third person singular present indicative in -[e]s, and the present participle and gerund form in -ing – are formed regularly in most cases. There are a few exceptions: the verb be has irregular forms throughout the present tense; the verbs have, do, and say have irregular -[e]s forms; and certain defective verbs (such as the modal auxiliaries) lack most inflection.

Irregular verbs in Modern English include many of the most common verbs: the dozen most frequently used English verbs are all irregular. New verbs (including loans from other languages, and nouns employed as verbs) usually follow the regular inflection, unless they are compound formations from an existing irregular verb (such as housesit, from sit).

Irregular verbs typically followed more regular patterns at a previous stage in the history of English. In particular, many such verbs derive from Germanic strong verbs, which make many of their inflected forms through vowel gradation, as can be observed in Modern English patterns such as sing–sang–sung. The regular verbs, on the other hand, with their preterites and past participles ending in -ed, follow the weak conjugation, which originally involved adding a dental consonant (-t or -d). Nonetheless, there are also many irregular verbs that follow or partially follow the weak conjugation.

For information on the conjugation of regular verbs in English, as well as other points concerning verb usage, see English verbs.

== Development ==
Most English irregular verbs are native, derived from verbs that existed in Old English. Nearly all verbs that have been borrowed into the language at a later stage have defaulted to the regular conjugation. There are a few exceptions, however, such as the verb catch (derived from Old Northern French cachier), whose irregular forms originated by way of analogy with native verbs such as teach.

Most irregular verbs exist as remnants of historical conjugation systems. When some grammatical rule became changed or disused, some verbs kept to the old pattern. For example, before the Great Vowel Shift, the verb keep (then pronounced /keːp/, slightly like "cap", or "cape" without the /j/ glide) belonged to a group of verbs whose vowel was shortened in the past tense; this pattern is preserved in the modern past tense kept (similarly crept, wept, leapt, left). Verbs such as peep, which have similar form but arose after the Vowel Shift, take the regular -ed ending.

The force of analogy tends to reduce the number of irregular verbs over time, as irregular verbs switch to regular conjugation patterns (for instance, the verb chide once had the irregular past tense chid, but this has given way to the regular formation chided). This is more likely to occur with less common verbs (where the irregular forms are less familiar); hence it is often the more common verbs (such as be, have, take) that tend to remain irregular. Many irregular verbs today have coexisting irregular and regular forms (as with spelt and spelled, dreamt and dreamed, etc.).

In a few cases, however, analogy has operated in the other direction (a verb's irregular forms arose by analogy with existing irregular verbs). This is the case with the example of catch given above; others include wear and string, which were originally weak verbs, but came to be conjugated like the similar-sounding strong verbs bear and swing.

In American English, the regular forms of verbs account for more than 90% of instances, whereas British English has a regular form frequency of 69% according to a 1991 study.

The verb forms described in this article are chiefly those that are accepted in standard English; many regional dialects have different irregular forms, such as sneak–snuck and dive-dove, common in the United States, as opposed to standard sneaked and dived respectively. In particular, it is fairly common in some types of non-standard speech to use (standard) past tenses as past participles, and vice versa; e.g. "have went" instead of "have gone" in Southern American English.

== Groups ==
The irregular verbs of Modern English form several groups with similar conjugation pattern and historical origin. These can be broadly grouped into two classes – the Germanic weak and strong groups – although historically some verbs have moved between these groups. There are also a few anomalous cases: the verbs be and go, which demonstrate suppletion; the verb do; and the defective modal verbs.

=== Strong verbs ===
Many irregular verbs derive from Germanic strong verbs, which display the vowel shift called ablaut, and do not add an ending such as -ed or -t for the past forms. These sometimes retain past participles with the ending -[e]n, as in give–gave–given and ride–rode–ridden, but in other cases this ending has been dropped, as in come–came–come and sing–sang–sung. This verb group was inherited from the parent Proto-Germanic language, and before that from the Proto-Indo-European language. It was originally a system of regular verbs, and in Old English and modern German the system remains more or less regular; however in Modern English relatively few verbs continue to follow such a pattern, and they are classed as irregular.

Verbs that retain a strong-type inflection in modern English and add -[e]n in the past participle include bear, beat, beget, bite, blow, break, choose, cleave, draw, drive, eat, fall, fly, forbid, forget, forsake, freeze, get (but with past participle got in British English), give, grow, know, lie, ride, rise, see, shake, shear, slay, smite, speak, steal, stride, strive, swear, take, tear, throw, tread, wake, weave, and write.

Those that do not add -[e]n in the usual past participle include become, begin, bind, burst, cling, come, drink, fight, find, fling, grind, hang, hold, let, ring, run, seek, shed, shine, shit, shoot, shrink, sing, sink, sit, slide, sling, slink, slit, spin, spring, stand, sting, stink, strike, swim, swing, win, wind and wring.

The verbs sow and swell are now usually regular in the past tense, but retain the strong-type past participles sown and swollen. Other verbs retain participles in -n for certain adjectival uses and distinguish them from other usage in perfect tenses ("He is drunk" vs "drunken sailor", "The shirt has shrunk" vs "shrunken hands" or "The ship was sunk" vs "sunken cheeks"). The participle in -n may sometimes be limited to certain specific usage, as in molten used only to refer to metals (compare "molten steel" vs "melted butter"). Sometimes the connection between the infinitive and the adjective (i.e. originally the past participle form) is not perceived as obvious any more, e.g. seethe – sodden. The verb crow is now regular in the past participle, but the strong past tense crew is sometimes used.

Some originally weak verbs have taken on strong-type forms by analogy with strong verbs. These include dig, dive (when dove is used as the past tense), hide, prove (when proven is used as the past participle), saw (past participle sawn), sew (past participle sewn), show (past participle shown), spit, stick, strew, string, and wear (analogy with bear).

For indication of the groups of strong verbs the listed words belong to, see the table at List of English irregular verbs.

=== Weak verbs ===
Some other irregular verbs derive from Germanic weak verbs, forming past tenses and participles with a -d or -t ending (or from originally strong verbs that have switched to the weak pattern). The weak conjugation is also the origin of the regular verbs ending in -ed; however various historical sound changes (and sometimes spelling changes) have led to certain types of irregularity in some verbs. The main processes are as follows (some verbs have been subject to more than one of these).

- Some weak verbs with long vowels in their present tense stems (such as keep) took a short vowel in the past tense and past participle (kept).
- In some weak verbs ending in a final -t or -d, this final consonant coalesced (contracted) with the weak past ending to leave a single -t or -d in the past forms.
- Some verbs ending in l or n had their past ending irregularly devoiced to -t, and in a few verbs ending with a v or z sound (leave, lose), both that sound and the past ending were devoiced. (The regular ending -ed is also devoiced after voiceless consonants in regular verbs, as described under English verbs § Past tense, but this is not now shown in the spelling – for example, the -ed in blessed and whipped is pronounced as a t, and these words were formerly written blest and whipt. The spelling -t following a voiceless consonant is retained for verbs that display an irregularity, as in kept and cost.)
- Some weak verbs continue the vowel shift called Rückumlaut ("reverse umlaut"). Details of the history of these verbs can be found under Germanic weak verb; those with -gh- in the spelling were also affected by the Germanic spirant law.
- A few weak verbs have undergone additional contractions or vowel shortenings in their past or present tense forms.
- A few verbs are regular in their spoken forms, but have irregular spelling.

The irregular weak verbs (being in normal use) can consequently be grouped as follows:

- Verbs with vowel shortening: creep, flee, hear, keep, leap, shoe (when shod is used), sleep, sweep and weep. (Of these, creep, flee, leap, sleep and weep derive from verbs that were originally strong.)
- Verbs with vowel shortening and devoicing of the ending: deal, dream, feel, kneel, lean, leave, lose (originally strong) and mean. Some of the verbs in this and in the preceding group have alternative regular forms, such as dreamed and leaped.
- Verbs with coalescence of consonants: bet, bid, cast, cost, cut, fit, hit, hurt, knit, put, quit, rid, set, shed, shut, split, spread, thrust, wed and wet. Some of these verbs have alternative regular forms, such as wedded and wetted. (The verb hoist behaves similarly to verbs in this group, but this was originally itself a past form of the now obsolete verb hoise; similarly clad was originally – and sometimes still is – a past form of clothe.)
- Verbs with coalescence of consonants and devoicing of the ending: bend, build, lend, rend, send, spend.
- Verbs with coalescence of consonants and vowel shortening: bleed, breed, feed, lead, light, meet, read (past tense and past participle also spelt read, but pronounced with a short vowel /ɹɛd/), and speed.
- Verbs with devoicing of the ending and no other irregularity: burn, dwell, learn, smell, spell, spill and spoil. Most of these have regular -ed forms as alternatives.
- Verbs continuing the Rückumlaut pattern: bring–brought, buy–bought, seek–sought, sell–sold, teach–taught, tell–told, and think–thought. The borrowed verb catch (caught) has also fallen into this pattern as a result of analogy.
- Verbs with additional contractions and shortenings: have–has–had, make–made, say–says–said (where says and said are pronounced with a short vowel /ɛ/). (The verb do has a similar vowel shortening in does and done; see below.)
- Verbs irregular only in spelling: lay–laid, pay–paid (although in the meaning "let out", of a rope etc., pay may have the regular spelling payed).

For weak verbs that have adopted strong-type past tense or past participle forms, see the section above on strong verbs. More information on the development of some of the listed verbs can be found at List of irregular verbs.

=== Anomalous cases ===
The following verbs do not fit exactly into any of the above categories:

- The modal verbs, which are defective verbs – they have only a present indicative form and (in some cases) a preterite, lacking nonfinite forms (infinitives, participles, gerunds), imperatives, and subjunctives (although some uses of the preterites are sometimes identified as subjunctives). Moreover, they do not add -s in the third person singular – this is because they derive either from preterites, or from Germanic preterite-present verbs, which were conjugated using the (strong-type) preterite form with present tense meaning. (Additional "true" preterites with past tense meaning were formed with the addition of dentals in the manner of the weak verbs.) The chief verbs of this closed class are can–could, may–might, shall–should, will–would, and must and ought (These last two have no preterites. They were originally preterites themselves). There are also dare and need, which follow the same pattern (no -s) in some contexts: "Dare he jump? She needn't worry" (dare derives from a preterite-present verb, but need is from an Old English regular verb). In some cases, used to is also listed as a modal verb. All the modal verbs both in their present and preterite forms—except for dare, need and used to—usually refer to the present or the future, not the past ("Could you do it now? Should I ask him for help?"). To express the past, modal verbs typically use suppletive forms (can – be able to, may – be allowed to, must – have to/be obliged to). The only two modal verbs that do distinguish the preterite forms are dare and need (dared (durst) and needed respectively). See English modal verbs § Etymology.
- Two verbs (be and go) that contain suppletive forms, i.e. one or more of their parts came from an entirely different root. With go this applies to the past tense went, which is originally from the verb wend. With be it applies to a number of different forms (see below). For details, see Indo-European copula (for be) and the article on the verb go. Derived from be is the defective verb beware, which does not inflect in normal use and which appears only in those forms in which the plain form of be would be used, namely the infinitive, the imperative, and the subjunctive.
- The verb do, which has the reduplicated form did for its past tense, an irregularity that is shared with other Germanic languages. Its past participle done can be compared to typical strong participles in -[e]n; however both this and the third person present tense does feature a short vowel in modern pronunciation: /dʌn/, /dʌz/.

== Verbs with irregular present tenses ==
Apart from the modal verbs, which are irregular in that they do not take an -s in the third person (see above), the only verbs with irregular present tense forms are be, do, have, say and an archaic verb wit (and prefixed forms of these, such as undo and gainsay, which conjugate in the same way as the basic forms).

The verb be has multiple irregular forms. In the present indicative it has am in the first person singular, is, which is pronounced with a Z sound, in the third person singular, and are, which is pronounced with an /α/ sound, in the plural and second person singular. (Its present subjunctive is be, as in "I suggest that you be extremely careful", though that is not irregular, as all verbs use the infinitive/imperative form for the present subjunctive.) It also has two past tense forms: was, which is pronounced with an /ə/ sound in US English, for the first and third persons singular, and were, which is pronounced with an /ə/ sound, for the plural and second person singular (although there are certain subjunctive uses in which were can substitute for was, as in "If I were you…" or "I wish I were there"). The past participle is been, which is pronounced with an /ɪ/ sound in US English, and the present participle and gerund forms are regular: being. For more details see Indo-European copula.

As mentioned above, apart from its other irregularities, the verb do, which is pronounced with an /u/ sound, has the third person present indicative does and past participle done pronounced with short vowels: /dʌz/ /dʌn/.

The verb have, which is pronounced with an /æ/ sound, has a contracted third person present indicative form: has /hæz/ (weak pronunciation /həz/). This is formed similarly to the verb's past tense had.

The verb say displays vowel shortening in the third person present indicative (although the spelling is regular): says /sɛz/. The same shortening occurs in the past form said /sɛd/. (Compare the diphthong in the plain form say /seɪ/.)

The verb wit is the only non-modal verb that is also a preterite-present verb and it does not take -s in the third person. It also has a vowel shift in the present tense as in "I wot".

For shortened forms of certain verbs and of their negations ('s, 're, won't, etc.), see English auxiliaries and contractions.

== Coincident forms ==
In regular English verbs, the past tense and past participle have the same form. This is also true of most irregular verbs that follow a variation of the weak conjugation, as can be seen in the list below. Differences between the past tense and past participle (as in sing–sang–sung, rise–rose–risen) generally appear in the case of verbs that continue the strong conjugation, or in a few cases weak verbs that have acquired strong-type forms by analogy – as with show (regular past tense showed, strong-type past participle shown). However, even some strong verbs have identical past tense and participle, as in cling–clung–clung.

In some verbs, the past tense, past participle, or both are identical in form to the basic (infinitive) form of the verb. This is the case with certain strong verbs, where historical sound changes have led to a leveling of the vowel modifications: for example, let has both past tense and past participle identical to the infinitive, while come has the past participle identical (but a different past tense, came). The same is true of the verbs listed above under § Weak verbs as having undergone coalescence of final consonants (and without other irregularities such as vowel shortening or devoicing of the ending): bet, bid, etc. (these verbs have infinitive, past tense and past participle all identical, although some of them also have alternative regular forms in -ed). The verb read /ɹiːd/ has the same spelling in all three forms, but not the same pronunciation for the past tense and past participle /ɹɛd/, as it exhibits vowel shortening.

In a few cases the past tense of an irregular verb has the same form as the infinitive of a different verb. For example, bore and found may be past tenses of bear and find, but may also represent independent (regular) verbs of different meaning. Another example is lay, which may be the past tense of lie, but is also an independent verb (regular in pronunciation, but with irregular spelling: lay–laid–laid). In fact the past tense verb lay derives from a causative of the verb from which lie derives. The two verbs are sometimes confused, with lay used in the intransitive senses prescriptively reserved for lie.

== Prefixed verbs ==
Nearly all of the basic irregular verbs are single-syllable words. Their irregular inflected forms are generally single-syllable also, except for the past participles in -en like chosen and risen. However, many additional irregular verbs are formed by adding prefixes to the basic ones: understand from stand, become from come, mistake from take, and so on. As a general rule, prefixed verbs are conjugated identically to the corresponding basic verbs; e.g. understand–understood–understood and become–became–become, following the patterns of stand–stood–stood and come–came–come. However, there are occasional differences: in British English, for instance, the past participle of get is got, (as opposed to gotten as in North American English) while that of forget is forgotten.

Only a few irregular verbs of more than one syllable cannot be analyzed as prefixed compounds of monosyllables. There is begin–began–begun (this is from Old English bēgun "to be getting or be finding a way", making it equivalent to be- + gate, but it has moved away from gate in both form and meaning). There is also forsake–forsook–forsaken (this is from Old English forsōc "to legally act for or affair for", making it equivalent to for- + sake, but it has moved away from sake in both form and meaning). There is also beseech–besought–besought (this is from Old English besēcan "to seek or inquire about", making it equivalent to be- + seek, but it has moved away from seek in both form and meaning); however the form besought is now archaic, the verb normally being conjugated regularly (beseeched).

== List ==
The following is a list of irregular verbs that are commonly used in standard modern English. It omits many rare, dialectal, and archaic forms, as well as most verbs formed by adding prefixes to basic verbs (unbend, understand, mistake, etc.). It also omits past participle forms that remain in use only adjectivally (clad, sodden, etc.). For a more complete list, with derivations, see List of English irregular verbs. Further information, including pronunciation, can be found in Wiktionary. The list that follows shows the base, or infinitive form, the past tense and the past participle of the verb.

- a- : for abide, arise, awake, see bide, rise, wake
- be (am, is, are) – was, were – been
- be- : for become, befall, beset, etc. see come, fall, set, etc.
- bear – bore – borne [spelt born in passive and adjectival uses relating to birth]
- beat – beat – beaten
- beget – begot – begot(ten) [Biblical past tense: begat]
- begin – began – begun
- bend – bent – bent
- bet – bet – bet [past tense and participle also sometimes betted]
- beware – defective verb [see anomalous cases above]
- bid – bid – bid [as in an auction]
- bid – bade/bid – bidden/bid [meaning "request"]
- bide – bided/bode – bided/bidden [but abide mostly uses the regular forms only]
- bind – bound – bound
- bite – bit – bitten
- bleed – bled – bled
- blow – blew – blown
- break – broke – broken
- breed – bred – bred
- bring – brought – brought
- build – built – built
- burn – burnt/burned – burnt/burned
- burst – burst – burst
- buy – bought – bought
- can – could [defective; see anomalous cases above]
- cast – cast – cast [prefixed forms broadcast, forecast, etc. sometimes take -ed]
- catch – caught – caught
- choose – chose – chosen
- clad – clad/cladded – clad/cladded [clad is also sometimes used as past form of clothe]
- cleave – clove/cleft – cloven/cleft [but regular when meaning "adhere"]
- cling – clung – clung
- come – came – come
- cost – cost/costed – cost/costed [but regular when meaning "calculate the cost of"]
- creep – crept/creeped – crept/creeped
- crow – crowed/crew – crowed [crew normally used only of a cock's crowing]
- cut – cut – cut
- dare – regular except for possible third person singular present dare (see anomalous cases above)
- deal – dealt – dealt
- dig – dug – dug
- dive – dived/dove – dived [the form dove is chiefly American]
- do (does /dʌz/) – did – done
- drag – dragged/drug – dragged/drug [the form drug is chiefly dialectal]
- draw – drew – drawn
- dream – dreamed/dreamt – dreamed/dreamt
- drink – drank – drunk
- drive – drove – driven
- dwell – dwelt/dwelled – dwelt/dwelled
- eat – ate – eaten
- fall – fell – fallen
- feed – fed – fed
- feel – felt – felt
- fight – fought – fought
- find – found – found
- fit – fit/fitted – fit/fitted
- flee – fled – fled
- fling – flung – flung
- fly – flew – flown [the form flied is common in the baseball sense]
- for(e)- : for forgo, foresee, etc. see go, see, etc.
- forbid – forbade/forbid – forbidden
- forget – forgot – forgotten
- forsake – forsook – forsaken
- freeze – froze – frozen
- get – got – gotten/got [past participle got in British English, gotten in American, but see have got]
- gild – gilded/gilt – gilded/gilt
- give – gave – given
- go – went – gone [see also have been]
- grind – ground – ground
- grow – grew – grown
- hang – hung/hanged – hung/hanged [the form hanged is more common in the sense of execution by hanging]
- have (has) – had – had
- hear – heard – heard
- hew – hewed – hewn/hewed
- hide – hid – hidden
- hit – hit – hit
- hoist – hoist/hoisted – hoist/hoisted
- hold – held – held
- hurt – hurt – hurt
- in- : for inlay, input, etc. see lay, put, etc.
- inter- : for interlay, interweave, etc. see lay, weave, etc.
- keep – kept – kept
- kneel – knelt/kneeled – knelt/kneeled
- knit – knit/knitted – knit/knitted
- know – knew – known
- lay – laid – laid
- lead – led – led
- lean – leaned/leant – leaned/leant
- leap – leaped/leapt – leaped/leapt
- learn – learned/learnt – learned/learnt
- leave – left – left
- lend – lent – lent
- let – let – let
- lie – lay – lain [but regular when meaning "tell an untruth"]
- light – lit/lighted – lit/lighted
- lose – lost – lost
- make – made – made
- may – might [defective; see anomalous cases above]
- mean – meant – meant
- meet – met – met
- mis- : for misspeak, mistake, etc. see speak, take, etc.
- mow – mowed – mowed/mown
- must – defective [see anomalous cases above]
- need – regular except for possible third person singular present need (see anomalous cases above)
- off- : for offset see set, etc.
- ought – defective [see anomalous cases above]
- out- : for outbid, output, etc. see bid, put, etc.
- over- : for overbid, overdo, etc. see bid, do, etc.
- pay – paid – paid [but sometimes spelt regularly when meaning "let out" (rope etc.)]
- plead – pleaded/pled – pleaded/pled
- pre- : for prepay, preset, etc. see pay, set, etc.
- prove – proved – proved/proven
- put – put – put [prefixed forms input and output sometimes take -ed]
- quit – quitted/quit – quitted/quit
- re- : for redo, remake, etc. see do, make, etc.
- read /riːd/ – read /rɛd/ – read /rɛd/
- rend – rent – rent
- rid – rid/ridded – rid/ridded/ridden
- ride – rid/rode – ridden
- ring – rang – rung
- rise – rose – risen
- run – ran – run
- saw – sawed – sawn/sawed
- say (says /sɛz/) – said – said
- see – saw – seen
- seek – sought – sought
- sell – sold – sold
- send – sent – sent
- set – set – set
- sew – sewed – sewn/sewed
- shake – shook – shaken/shook
- shall – should [defective; see anomalous cases above]
- shear – sheared/shore – shorn/sheared
- shed – shed – shed
- shine – shone/shined – shone/shined
- shit – shat/shit/shitted – shat/shit/shitted
- shoe – shoed/shod – shoed/shod
- shoot – shot – shot
- show – showed – shown/showed
- shrink – shrank/shrunk – shrunk
- shrive – shrove – shriven
- shut – shut – shut
- sing – sang – sung
- sink – sank – sunk
- sit – sat – sat
- slay – slew/slayed – slain/slayed
- sleep – slept – slept
- slide – slid – slid
- sling – slung – slung
- slink – slunk – slunk
- slit – slit – slit
- smell – smelled/smelt – smelled/smelt
- smite – smote – smitten
- sneak – sneaked/snuck – sneaked/snuck [snuck is chiefly American, and is regarded as informal. It was first cited in 1887]
- sow – sowed – sown/sowed
- speak – spoke – spoken
- speed – sped/speeded – sped/speeded
- spell – spelled/spelt – spelled/spelt
- spend – spent – spent
- spill – spilled/spilt – spilled/spilt
- spin – span/spun – spun
- spit – spat/spit – spat/spit [the form spit rather than spat is common in America]
- split – split – split
- spoil – spoiled/spoilt – spoiled/spoilt
- spread – spread – spread
- spring – sprang/sprung – sprung
- stand – stood – stood
- stave – staved/stove – staved/stove
- steal – stole – stolen
- stick – stuck – stuck
- sting – stung – stung
- stink – stank – stunk
- strew – strewed – strewn/strewed
- stride – strode – stridden/strode
- strike – struck – struck/stricken
- string – strung – strung
- strive – strove/strived – striven/strived
- swear – swore – sworn
- sweat – sweated/sweat – sweated/sweat
- sweep – swept – swept
- swell – swelled – swollen/swelled
- swim – swam – swum
- swing – swang/swung – swung
- take – took – taken
- teach – taught – taught
- tear – tore – torn
- tell – told – told
- text – texted/text – texted/text
- think – thought – thought [Thunk is a pseudo-archaic past participle by analogy to Drink/Drunk]
- thrive – thrived/throve – thrived/thriven
- throw – threw – thrown
- thrust – thrust/thrusted – thrust/thrusted
- tread – trod – trodden/trod
- un- : for unbend, unweave, etc. see bend, weave, etc.
- under- : for underlie, undergo, understand, etc. see lie, go, stand, etc.
- up- : for upset see set, etc.
- wake – woke – woken
- wear – wore – worn
- weave – wove – woven
- wed – wed/wedded – wed/wedded
- weep – wept – wept
- wet – wet/wetted – wet/wetted
- will – would [defective; see anomalous cases above]
- win – won – won
- wind – wound – wound [but regular in the meanings connected with air and breath]
- with- : for withdraw, withhold, withstand, see draw, hold, stand
- wring – wrang/wrung – wrung
- write – wrote – written

== In language acquisition ==
Steven Pinker's book Words and Rules describes how mistakes made by children in learning irregular verbs throw light on the mental processes involved in language acquisition. The fact that young children often attempt to conjugate irregular verbs according to regular patterns indicates that their processing of the language involves the application of rules to produce new forms, in addition to the simple reproduction of forms that they have already heard.

See also Regular and irregular verbs § Linguistic study.
