= Regular and irregular verbs =

Classification of verbs by regularity of inflection

A regular verb is any verb whose conjugation follows the typical pattern, or one of the typical patterns, of the language to which it belongs. A verb whose conjugation follows a different pattern is called an irregular verb. This is one instance of the distinction between regular and irregular inflection, which can also apply to other word classes, such as nouns and adjectives.

In English, for example, verbs such as play, enter, and like are regular since they form their inflected parts by adding the typical endings -s, -ing and -ed to give forms such as plays, entering, and liked. On the other hand, verbs such as drink, hit and have are irregular since some of their parts are not made according to the typical pattern: drank and drunk (not "drinked"); hit (as past tense and past participle, not "hitted") and has and had (not "haves" and "haved").

The classification of verbs as regular or irregular is to some extent a subjective matter. If some conjugational paradigm in a language is followed by a limited number of verbs, or if it requires the specification of more than one principal part (as with the German strong verbs), views may differ as to whether the verbs in question should be considered irregular. Most inflectional irregularities arise as a result of series of fairly uniform historical changes so forms that appear to be irregular from a synchronic (contemporary) point of view may be seen as following more regular patterns when the verbs are analyzed from a diachronic (historical linguistic) viewpoint.

== Development ==
When a language develops some type of inflection, such as verb conjugation, it normally produces certain typical (regular) patterns by which words in the given class come to make their inflected forms. The language may develop a number of different regular patterns, either as a result of conditional sound changes which cause differentiation within a single pattern, or through patterns with different derivations coming to be used for the same purpose. An example of the latter is provided by the strong and weak verbs of the Germanic languages; the strong verbs inherited their method of making past forms (vowel ablaut) from Proto-Indo-European, while for the weak verbs a different method (addition of dental suffixes) developed.

Irregularities in verb conjugation (and other inflectional irregularities) may arise in various ways. Sometimes the result of multiple conditional and selective historical sound changes is to leave certain words following a practically unpredictable pattern. This has happened with the strong verbs (and some groups of weak verbs) in English; patterns such as sing–sang–sung and stand–stood–stood, although they derive from what were more or less regular patterns in older languages, are now peculiar to a single verb or small group of verbs in each case, and are viewed as irregular.

Irregularities may also arise from suppletion – forms of one verb may be taken over and used as forms of another. This has happened in the case of the English word went, which was originally the past tense of wend, but has come to be used instead as the past tense of go. The verb be also has a number of suppletive forms (be, is, was, etc., with various different origins) – this is common for copular verbs in Indo-European languages.

The regularity and irregularity of verbs is affected by changes taking place by way of analogy – there is often a tendency for verbs to switch to a different, usually more regular, pattern under the influence of other verbs. This is less likely when the existing forms are very familiar through common use – hence among the most common verbs in a language (like be, have, go, etc.) there is often a greater incidence of irregularity. (Analogy can occasionally work the other way, too – some irregular English verb forms such as shown, caught and spat have arisen through the influence of existing strong or irregular verbs.)

== Types of pattern ==
The most straightforward type of regular verb conjugation pattern involves a single class of verbs, a single principal part (the root or one particular conjugated form), and a set of exact rules which produce, from that principal part, each of the remaining forms in the verb's paradigm. This is generally considered to be the situation with regular English verbs – from the one principal part, namely the plain form of a regular verb (the bare infinitive, such as play, happen, skim, interchange, etc.), all the other inflected forms (which in English are not numerous; they consist of the third person singular present tense, the past tense and past participle, and the present participle/gerund form) can be derived by way of consistent rules. These rules involve the addition of inflectional endings (-s, -[e]d, -ing), together with certain morphophonological rules about how those endings are pronounced, and certain rules of spelling (such as the doubling of certain consonants). Verbs which in any way deviate from these rules (there are around 200 such verbs in the language) are classed as irregular.

A language may have more than one regular conjugation pattern. French verbs, for example, follow different patterns depending on whether their infinitive ends in -er, -ir or -re (complicated slightly by certain rules of spelling). A verb which does not follow the expected pattern based on the form of its infinitive is considered irregular.

In some languages, however, verbs may be considered regular even if the specification of one of their forms is not sufficient to predict all of the rest; they have more than one principal part. In Latin, for example, verbs are considered to have four principal parts (see Latin conjugation for details). Specification of all of these four forms for a given verb is sufficient to predict all of the other forms of that verb – except in a few cases, when the verb is irregular.

To some extent it may be a matter of convention or subjective preference to state whether a verb is regular or irregular. In English, for example, if a verb is allowed to have three principal parts specified (the bare infinitive, past tense and past participle), then the number of irregular verbs will be drastically reduced (this is not the conventional approach, however). The situation is similar to the strong verbs in German (these may or may not be described as irregular). In French, what are traditionally called the "regular -re verbs" (those that conjugate like vendre) are not in fact particularly numerous, and may alternatively be considered to be just another group of similarly behaving irregular verbs. The most unambiguously irregular verbs are often very commonly used verbs such as the copular verb be in English and its equivalents in other languages, which frequently have a variety of suppletive forms and thus follow an exceptionally unpredictable pattern of conjugation.

=== Irregularity in spelling only ===
It is possible for a verb to be regular in pronunciation, but irregular in spelling. Examples of this are the English verbs lay and pay. In terms of pronunciation, these make their past forms in the regular way, by adding the /d/ sound. However their spelling deviates from the regular pattern: they are not spelt "layed" and "payed" (although the latter form is used in some e.g. nautical contexts as "the sailor payed out the anchor chain"), but laid and paid. This contrasts with fully regular verbs such as sway and stay, which have the regularly spelt past forms swayed and stayed. The English present participle is never irregular in spelling, with the exception that dyeing and singeing irregularly retain the e to distinguish them from dying and singing.

== Linguistic study ==
In linguistic analysis, the concept of regular and irregular verbs (and other types of regular and irregular inflection) commonly arises in psycholinguistics, and in particular in work related to language acquisition. In studies of first language acquisition (where the aim is to establish how the human brain processes its native language), one debate among 20th-century linguists revolved around whether small children learn all verb forms as separate pieces of vocabulary or whether they deduce forms by the application of rules. Since a child can hear a regular verb for the first time and immediately reuse it correctly in a different conjugated form which he or she has never heard, it is clear that the brain does work with rules; but irregular verbs must be processed differently. A common error for small children is to conjugate irregular verbs as though they were regular, which is taken as evidence that we learn and process our native language partly by the application of rules, rather than, as some earlier scholarship had postulated, solely by learning the forms. In fact, children often use the most common irregular verbs correctly in their earliest utterances but then switch to incorrect regular forms for a time when they begin to operate systematically. That allows a fairly precise analysis of the phases of this aspect of first language acquisition.

Regular and irregular verbs are also of significance in second language acquisition, and in particular in language teaching and formal learning, where rules such as verb paradigms are defined, and exceptions (such as irregular verbs) need to be listed and learned explicitly. The importance of irregular verbs is enhanced by the fact that they often include the most commonly used verbs in the language (including verbs such as be and have in English, their equivalents être and avoir in French, sein and haben in German, etc.).

In historical linguistics the concept of irregular verbs is not so commonly referenced. Since most irregularities can be explained by processes of historical language development, these verbs are only irregular when viewed synchronically; they often appear regular when seen in their historical context. In the study of Germanic verbs, for example, historical linguists generally distinguish between strong and weak verbs, rather than irregular and regular (although occasional irregularities still arise even in this approach).

When languages are being compared informally, one of the few quantitative statistics which are sometimes cited is the number of irregular verbs. These counts are not particularly accurate for a wide variety of reasons, and academic linguists are reluctant to cite them. But it does seem that some languages have a greater tolerance for paradigm irregularity than others.

== By language ==
=== English ===
With the exception of the highly irregular verb be, an English verb can have up to five forms: its plain form (or bare infinitive), a third person singular present tense, a past tense (or preterite), a past participle, and the -ing form that serves as both a present participle and gerund.

The rules for the formation of the inflected parts of regular verbs are given in detail in the article on English verbs. In summary they are as follows:

- The third person singular present tense is formed by adding the ending -s (or -es after certain letters) to the plain form. When the plain form ends with the letter -y following a consonant, this becomes -ies. The ending is pronounced /s/ after a voiceless consonant sound (as in hops, halts, packs, bluffs, laughs), or /z/ after a voiced consonant or vowel sound (as in robs, lends, begs, sings, thaws, flies, sighs), but /ɪz/ after a sibilant (passes, pushes, marches).
- The past tense and past participle are identical; they are formed with the ending -ed (or -t in some verbs), which as in the previous case has three different pronunciations (/t/, /d/, /ɪd/). Certain spelling rules apply, including the doubling of consonants before the ending in forms like conned and preferred. There is some variation in the application of these spelling rules with some rarer verbs, and particularly with verbs ending -c (panic–panicked, zinc–zinc(k)ed, arc–arc(k)ed, etc.), meaning that these forms are not fully predictable, but such verbs are not normally listed among the irregular ones. (The verbs lay and pay, however, are commonly listed as irregular, despite being regular in pronunciation – their past forms have the anomalous spellings laid and paid.)
- The present participle/gerund is formed by adding -ing, again with the application of certain spelling rules similar to those that apply with -ed.

The irregular verbs of English are described and listed in the article English irregular verbs (for a more extensive list, see List of English irregular verbs). In the case of these:

- The third person singular present tense is formed regularly, except in the case of the modal verbs (can, shall, etc.) which do not add -s, the verb be (which has three present indicative forms: am, is and are), and the three verbs have, do and say, which produce the forms has, does (pronounced with a short vowel, /dʌz/), and says (pronounced with a short vowel, /sɛz/).
- The past tense and past participle forms are the forms most commonly made in irregular fashion. About 200 verbs in normal use have irregularities in one or other (or usually both) of these forms. They may derive from Germanic strong verbs, as with sing–sang–sung or rise–rose–risen, or from weak verbs which have come to deviate from the standard pattern in some way (teach–taught–taught, keep–kept–kept, build–built–built, etc.). (The past participle often ends in "n", " d" or "ed".) The past and past participle forms change in spelling sometimes.
- The present participle/gerund is formed regularly, in -ing (except for those defective verbs, such as the modals, which lack such a form).

==== Common irregular verbs ====
Some examples of common irregular verbs in English, other than modals, are:

- arise
- be
- come
- do
- eat
- fall
- get
- give
- go
- have
- hear
- know
- lend
- make
- run
- say
- see
- take
- think
- wear
- drink
- put
- cut
- catch
- drive

=== Other languages ===
For regular and irregular verbs in other languages, see the articles on the grammars of those languages. Particular articles include, for example:

- Dutch conjugation
- French verbs and French conjugation
- German verbs and German conjugation
- Ancient Greek verbs (for verbs in Modern Greek, see Modern Greek grammar)
- Irish conjugation
- Italian conjugation
- Japanese verb conjugation and Japanese irregular verbs
- Latin conjugation
- Portuguese conjugation
- Spanish verbs, Spanish conjugation and Spanish irregular verbs
- Welsh has five irregular verbs whose conjugations differ between spoken Welsh and the literary language. The English equivalents of those Welsh verbs are irregular as well.

Some grammatical information relating to specific verbs in various languages can also be found in Wiktionary.

=== Constructed languages ===
Most natural languages, to different extents, have a number of irregular verbs. Artificial auxiliary languages usually have a single regular pattern for all verbs (as well as other parts of speech) as a matter of design, because inflectional irregularities are considered to increase the difficulty of learning and using a language. Other constructed languages, however, need not show such regularity, especially if they are designed to look similar to natural ones.

The auxiliary language Interlingua has some irregular verbs, principally esser "to be", which has an irregular present tense form es "is" (instead of expected esse), an optional plural son "are", an optional irregular past tense era "was/were" (alongside regular esseva), and a unique subjunctive form sia (which can also function as an imperative). Other common verbs also have irregular present tense forms, namely vader "to go" — va, ir "to go" — va (also shared by the present tense of vader), and haber "to have" — ha.
