= Attributive verb =

Part of speech

An attributive verb is a verb that modifies (expresses an attribute of) a noun in the manner of an attributive adjective, rather than express an independent idea as a predicate.

In English (and in most European languages), verb forms that can be used attributively are typically non-finite forms — participles and infinitives — as well as certain verb-derived words that function as ordinary adjectives. All words of these types may be called verbal adjectives, although those of the latter type (those that behave grammatically like ordinary adjectives, with no verb-like features) may be distinguished as deverbal adjectives. An example of a verbal adjective with verb-like features is the word wearing in the sentence The man wearing a hat is my father (it behaves as a verb in taking an object, a hat, although the resulting phrase wearing a hat functions like an attributive adjective in modifying man). An example of a deverbal adjective is the word interesting in That was a very interesting speech; although it is derived from the verb to interest, it behaves here entirely like an ordinary adjective such as nice or long.

However, some languages, such as Japanese and Chinese, can use finite verbs attributively. In such a language, the man wearing a hat might translate, word-for-word, into the wears a hat man. Here, the function of an attributive adjective is played by the phrase wears a hat, which is headed by the finite verb wears. This is a kind of relative clause.

== English ==
As mentioned above, verb forms that are used attributively in English are often called verbal adjectives, or in some cases deverbal adjectives (if they no longer behave grammatically as verbs).

The truly "verbal" adjectives are non-finite verb forms: participles (present and past), and sometimes to-infinitives. These act as verbs in that they form a verb phrase, possibly taking objects and other dependents and modifiers that are typical of verbs; however, that verb phrase then plays the role of an attributive adjective in the larger sentence. In the following examples, the attributive verb is bolded, and the verb phrase acting as the attributive adjective is shown in italics.

- The cat **sitting** on the fence is mine.
- The actor **given** the prize is not my favorite.
- This is a great place **to eat**.

Deverbal adjectives often have the same form as (and similar meaning to) the participles, but behave grammatically purely as adjectives — they do not take objects, for example, as a verb might. For example:

- It was a very **exciting** game.
- **Interested** parties should apply to the office.

Sometimes deverbal adjectives additionally take prefixes, as in hand-fed turkeys, uneaten food and meat-eating animals. Some compound adjectives are formed using the plain infinitive form of the verb, as in a no-go area or no-fly zone, and take-away food. Occasionally they are finite verb phrases: a must-see movie; their can-do attitude. Verbal and deverbal adjectives can often also be used as predicate (rather than attributive) adjectives, as in The game was exciting; The cat was sitting on the fence. Deverbal adjectives may form further derivatives, such as adverbs (excitedly, interestingly).

English has analogous types of verbal nouns (truly verbal kinds — gerunds and infinitives — and deverbal nouns). Deverbal nouns may also be used attributively, as noun adjuncts, as in a swimming competition.

For more details of the usage of some of the above verb forms, see Uses of non-finite verbs in English.

== Japanese ==
Japanese allows attributive finite verbs, and the following characteristics of Japanese are common among verb-final languages. For example, in Japanese, predicative verbs come at the end of the clause, after the nouns, while attributive verbs come before the noun. These are mostly equivalent to relative clauses in English; Japanese does not have relative pronouns like who, which, or when:

昨日 あの 人が 歩いた。
Kinō ano hito-ga aruita.
yesterday that person walked
That person walked yesterday.

昨日 歩いた あの 人。
kinō aruita ano hito
yesterday walked that person
That person who walked yesterday...

Japanese attributive verbs inflect for grammatical aspect as shown above, and also for grammatical polarity, but usually not for politeness. For example, the polite form of hito ga aruita is hito ga arukimashita, but the form arukimashita hito, although grammatically correct, is perceived to be too polite and paraphrastic. As such, modern Japanese verbs commonly have the same form in both their predicative and attributive usage. Historically, however, these had been separate forms, which is still the case in languages such as Korean and Turkish, as illustrated by the following examples:

Classical Japanese:

- kaze samushi "The wind is cold"
- samuki kaze "The cold wind" (lit. "The wind that is cold")

Turkish:

- Adam şiir okur, "The man reads poetry"
- Şiir okuyan adam, "The man who reads poetry"

Notice that both of these languages have a verb-final word order, and that none of them have relative pronouns. They also do not have a clear distinction between verbs and adjectives in their modern usage. For example, the word aoi, meaning "blue", effectively functions both as an adjective and as well descriptive verb, without changes in inflection:

- Sora (ga) aoi. "The sky is blue."
- Aoi sora "A blue sky."

== Bantu languages ==
In the Bantu languages, attributive verbs are formed by the addition of the "pre-prefix" (or "initial vowel"). For example, in Luganda:

- Abasajja batambula, "The men walk" (predicative)
- Abasajja abatambula, "The men who walk" (attributive)

This is similar to the behaviour of attributive adjectives:

- Abasajja bagagga, "The men are rich" (predicative)
- Abasajja abagagga, "The men who are rich" (i.e. "the rich men") (attributive)

The attributive verb formation is the usual way of forming relatives in Luganda when the antecedent is the subject of the subordinate verb, and is sometimes called the "subject relative". Relative pronouns do exist, but they are only used for "object relatives", i.e. relative clauses where the antecedent is the object of the subordinate verb.

== See also ==
- Participle
- Attributive adjective
- Noun adjunct (also referred to as attributive noun)
- Reduced relative clause
