= Indo-European copula =

Presence of the verb "to be" in Indo-European languages

A feature common to all Indo-European languages is the presence of a verb corresponding to the English verb to be.

== General features ==
This verb has two basic meanings:

- In a less marked context it is a simple copula (I’m tired; That’s a shame!), a function which in non-Indo-European languages can be expressed quite differently.
- In a more heavily marked context it expresses existence (I think therefore I am).

The dividing line between these is not always easy to draw.

Some languages have shared these functions between several verbs: Irish, Spanish and Persian all have multiple equivalents of to be, making a variety of distinctions.

Many Indo-European languages also use the verb "to be" as an auxiliary for the formation of compound (periphrastic) tenses (I’m working; I was bitten). Other functions vary from language to language. For example, although in its basic meanings, to be is a stative verb, English puts it to work as a dynamic verb in fixed collocations (You are being very annoying).

The copula is the most irregular verb in many Indo-European languages. This is partly because it is more frequently used than any other, and partly because Proto-Indo-European offered more than one verb suitable for use in these functions, with the result that the daughter languages, in different ways, have tended to form suppletive verb paradigms.

This article describes the way in which the irregular forms have developed from a series of roots.

== The Proto-Indo-European [PIE] roots ==
=== *h₁es- ===
The root *h₁es- was certainly already a copula in Proto-Indo-European.

The e-grade *h₁es- (see Indo-European ablaut) is found in such forms as English is, Irish is, German ist, Latin est, Sanskrit asti, Persian ast, Old Church Slavonic jestĭ.

The zero grade *h₁s- produces forms beginning with /s/, like German sind, Latin sumus, Vedic Sanskrit smas, etc.

In PIE, *h₁es- was an athematic verb in -mi; that is, the first person singular was *h₁esmi; this inflection survives in English am, Pashto yem, Persian am, Sanskrit asmi, Bengali first-person verb ending -ām, Old Church Slavonic esmĭ, etc.

This verb is generally reconstructed for Proto-Indo-European thus:

Person	Present indicative	Imperfect indicative	Subjunctive	Optative	Imperative
1st singular	*h₁és-mi	*h₁és-m̥	*h₁és-oh₂	*h₁s-iéh₁-m	—
2nd singular	*h₁és-i	*h₁és	*h₁és-esi	*h₁s-iéh₁-s	*h₁és, *h₁s-dʰí
3rd singular	*h₁és-ti	*h₁és-t	*h₁és-eti	*h₁s-iéh₁-t	*h₁és-tu
1st dual	*h₁s-uós	*h₁s-ué	*h₁és-owos	*h₁s-ih₁-wé	—
2nd dual	*h₁s-tés	*h₁s-tóm	*h₁és-etes	*h₁s-ih₁-tóm	*h₁s-tóm
3rd dual	*h₁s-tés	*h₁s-tā́m	*h₁és-etes	*h₁s-ih₁-tā́m	*h₁s-tā́m
1st plural	*h₁s-m̥ós	*h₁s-m̥é	*h₁és-omos	*h₁s-ih₁-mé	—
2nd plural	*h₁s-té	*h₁s-té	*h₁és-ete	*h₁s-ih₁-té	*h₁s-té
3rd plural	*h₁s-énti	*h₁s-énd	*h₁és-onti	*h₁s-ih₁-énd	*h₁s-éntu

=== *bʰuH- ===
The root *bʰuH- or *bʰuh₂- (which did not have ablaut variations in the proto-language) probably meant 'to grow', but also 'to become'.

This is the source of the English infinitive be and participle been. Also, for example, the Scottish Gaelic "future" tense bithidh; the Irish imperative bí, past bhí and future beidh; the Welsh bod (along with the other b- initial forms); Persian imperative bov, past bud and future bâš; and the Slavic infinitive and past, etc. for example Russian быть (byt’), был (byl).

PIE *bʰ became Latin /f/, hence the Latin future participle futūrus and perfect fuī; Latin fīō 'I become' is also from this root, as is the Greek verb φύω (phúō), from which physics and physical are derived.

*bʰuH- was a preterite-present verb, i.e. imperfect endings for the present, and can be reconstructed as follows:

Person	Indicative	Subjunctive	Optative	Imperative
1st singular	*bʰúH-m	*bʰúH-oh₂	*bʰuH-yéh₁-m	—
2nd singular	*bʰúH-s	*bʰúH-esi	*bʰuH-yéh₁-s	*bʰúH, *bʰuH-dʰí
3rd singular	*bʰúH-t	*bʰúH-eti	*bʰuH-yéh₁-t	*bʰúH-tu
1st dual	*bʰuH-wé	*bʰúH-owos	*bʰuH-ih₁-wé	—
2nd dual	*bʰuH-tóm	*bʰúH-etes	*bʰuH-ih₁-tóm	*bʰuH-tóm
3rd dual	*bʰuH-tā́m	*bʰúH-etes	*bʰuH-ih₁-tā́m	*bʰuH-tā́m
1st plural	*bʰuH-mé	*bʰúH-omos	*bʰuH-ih₁-mé	—
2nd plural	*bʰuH-té	*bʰúH-ete	*bʰuH-ih₁-té	*bʰuH-té
3rd plural	*bʰuH-énd	*bʰúH-onti	*bʰuH-ih₁-énd	*bʰuH-éntu

=== *h₂wes- ===
The root *h₂wes- may originally have meant "to live", and has been productive in all Germanic languages. The e-grade is present in the German participle gewesen, the o-grade (*wos-) survives in English and Old High German was, while the lengthened e-grade (*wēs-) gives us English were. (The Germanic forms with /r/ instead of /s/ result from grammatischer Wechsel.) See Germanic strong verb: Class 5.

=== *h₁er- ===
This has been claimed as the origin of the Old Norse and later Scandinavian languages' present stem: Old Norse em, ert, er, erum, eruð, eru, the second person forms of which were borrowed into English as art and are. It has also been seen as the origin of the Latin imperfect (eram, eras, erat) and future tenses (ero, eris, erit).

However, other authorities link these forms with *h₁es- and assume grammatischer Wechsel (/s/→/r/), although this is not normally found in the present stem. Donald Ringe argues that the copula was sometimes unaccented in Pre-Proto-Germanic, which would have then triggered the voicing under Verner's law. He explains the Germanic first person singular form *immi as such, deriving it from earlier *ezmi, since -zm-, but not -sm-, was assimilated to -mm- in Germanic (for which other evidence exists as well). Furthermore, the third person plural form *sindi (from PIE *h₁sénti) shows that this word, too, was unaccented. If the accent had been preserved, it would have become *sinþi, but that form is not found in any Germanic language. In this view, it is likely that stressed and unstressed varieties of the copula (with corresponding voiceless and voiced fricatives) existed side by side in Germanic, and the involvement of a separate root *h₁er- is unnecessary.

The Latin forms could be explained by rhotacism.

=== *steh₂- ===
The root *(s)teh₂- meant "to stand". From this root comes the present stem of the so-called "substantive verb" in Irish and Scottish Gaelic, tá and tha respectively, as well as taw in Welsh. On the absence of the initial s- in Celtic, see Indo-European s-mobile.

In Latin, stō, stare retained the meaning "to stand", until local forms of Vulgar Latin began to use it as a copula in certain circumstances. Today, this survives in that several Romance languages (Galician-Portuguese, Spanish, Catalan) use it as one of their two copulae, and there is also a Romance tendency for a past participle derived from *steh₂- to replace the original one of the copula (this occurs in French, Italian and the main dialects of Catalan). See also Romance copula.

Although in Dutch this verb retains its primary meaning of "stand", it is used in an auxiliary-like function that only has a secondary meaning of "standing", for example: ik sta te koken ("I am cooking", literally "I stand to cook"). While it is not a full copula (it can normally only be used as an auxiliary with another verb), it does have shades of meaning that resemble that of the Italian sto cucinando ("I am cooking"). The intransitive verbs zitten ("to sit"), liggen ("to lie") and lopen ("to walk/run") are used in similar ways.

In Swedish, which usually lacks gerund forms, the corresponding stå is often used similarly, along with sitta ("to sit"), ligga ("to lie") and gå ("to walk").

In Hindustani the past tense of the copula honā "to be" which are «tʰā», «tʰe», «tʰī» and «tʰī̃» are derived from Sanskrit «stʰā». Gujarati has a cognate verb «tʰavũ» "to happen"; cf. Bengali aorist «tʰā-» (to stay) as well.

== The resulting paradigms ==
=== Indo-Iranian languages ===
==== Indic languages ====
===== Sanskrit =====
The Vedic Sanskrit root as (to be) is derived from the Indo-European root **h₁es-.

Mood/Tense		Indicative					Optative	Imperative
Mood/Tense		Present		Perfect	Imperfect	Periphrasatic Future	Optative	Imperative
Voice		Active	Passive	Perfect	Imperfect	Periphrasatic Future	Optative	Imperative
singular	1st	asmi	he	āsa	āsam	asitāsmi	syām	asāni
singular	2nd	asi	se	āsitha	āsīḥ	asitāsi	syāḥ	edhi
singular	3rd	asti	ste	āsa	āsīt	asitā	syāt	astu
dual	1st	svaḥ	svahe	āsiva	āsva	asitāsvaḥ	syāva	asāva
dual	2nd	sthaḥ	sāthe	āsathuḥ	āstam	asitāsthaḥ	syātam	stam
dual	3rd	staḥ	sāte	āsatuḥ	āstām	asitārau	syātām	stām
plural	1st	smaḥ	smahe	āsima	āsma	asitāsmaḥ	syāma	asāma
plural	2nd	stha	dhve	āsa	āsta	asitāstha	syāta	sta
plural	3rd	santi	sate	āsuḥ	āsan	asitāraḥ	syuḥ	santu

bhū (to be) is derived from Indo-European **bʰuH-.

Mood/Tense		Indicative									Conditional	Optative		Aorist		Injunctive		Benedictive	Imperative	
Mood/Tense		Present		Perfect		Imperfect		Future		Periphrasatic Future	Conditional	Optative		Aorist		Injunctive		Benedictive	Imperative	
Voice		Active	Passive	Active	Passive	Active	Passive	Active	Passive	Periphrasatic Future	Conditional	Active	Passive	Active	Passive	Active	Passive	Benedictive	Active	Passive
singular	1st	bhavāmi	bhūye	babhūva	babhūve	abhavam	abhūye	bhaviṣyāmi	bhaviṣye	bhavitāsmi	abhaviṣyam	bhaveyam	bhūyeya	abhūvam		bhūvam		bhūyāsam	bhavāni	bhūyai
singular	2nd	bhavasi	bhūyase	babhūvitha	babhūviṣe	abhavaḥ	abhūyathāḥ	bhaviṣyasi	bhaviṣyase	bhavitāsi	abhaviṣyaḥ	bhaveḥ	bhūyethāḥ	abhūḥ		bhūḥ		bhūyāḥ	bhava	bhūyasva
singular	3rd	bhavati	bhūyate	babhūva	babhūve	abhavat	abhūyata	bhaviṣyati	bhaviṣyate	bhavitā	abhaviṣyat	bhavet	bhūyeta	abhūt	abhāvi	bhūt	bhāvi	bhūyāt	bhavatu	bhūyatām
dual	1st	bhavāvaḥ	bhūyāvahe	babhūviva	babhūvivahe	abhavāva	abhūyāvahi	bhaviṣyāvaḥ	bhaviṣyāvahe	bhavitāsvaḥ	abhaviṣyāva	bhaveva	bhūyevahi	abhūva		bhūva		bhūyāsva	bhavāva	bhūyāvahai
dual	2nd	bhavathaḥ	bhūyethe	babhūvathuḥ	babhūvāthe	abhavatam	abhūyethām	bhaviṣyathaḥ	bhaviṣyethe	bhavitāsthaḥ	abhaviṣyatam	bhavetam	bhūyeyāthām	abhūtam		bhūtam		bhūyāstam	bhavatam	bhūyethām
dual	3rd	bhavataḥ	bhūyete	babhūvatuḥ	babhūvāte	abhavatām	abhūyetām	bhaviṣyataḥ	bhaviṣyete	bhavitārau	abhaviṣyatām	bhavetām	bhūyeyātām	abhūtām		bhūtām		bhūyāstām	bhavatām	bhūyetām
plural	1st	bhavāmaḥ	bhūyāmahe	babhūvima	babhūvimahe	abhavāma	abhūyāmahi	bhaviṣyāmaḥ	bhaviṣyāmahe	bhavitāsmaḥ	abhaviṣyāma	bhavema	bhūyemahi	abhūma		bhūma		bhūyāsma	bhavāma	bhūyāmahai
plural	2nd	bhavatha	bhūyadhve	babhūva	babhūviḍhve	abhavata	abhūyadhvam	bhaviṣyatha	bhaviṣyadhve	bhavitāstha	abhaviṣyata	bhaveta	bhūyedhvam	abhūta		bhūta		bhūyāsta	bhavata	bhūyadhvam
plural	3rd	bhavanti	bhūyante	babhūvuḥ	babhūvire	abhavan	abhūyanta	bhaviṣyanti	bhaviṣyante	bhavitāraḥ	abhaviṣyan	bhaveyuḥ	bhūyeran	abhūvan		bhūvan		bhūyāsuḥ	bhavantu	bhūyantām

===== Hindi-Urdu =====
In modern Hindi-Urdu (Hindustani), the Sanskrit verb अस् (as) (to be) which is derived from the Indo-European root **h₁es- has developed into the present indicative forms of the verb होना ہونا (honā) (to be). The infinitive होना ہونا (honā) itself is derived from the Sanskrit verb root भू (bʱū) which is derived from Indo-European root *b^{h}uH-. The indicative imperfect forms of होना ہونا (honā) comes from Sanskrit स्थित (stʰita) "standing, situated" which are derived from the PIE root *steh₂- (“to stand”). होना ہونا (honā) is the only verb in Hindi-Urdu to have the present indicative, imperfect indicative, presumptive mood and the present subjunctive conjugations, and all the other verbs in Hindi-Urdu lack them.

The verb होना / ہونا (honā) can be translated as "to be", "to exist", "to happen" or "to have" depending on the context, and when used in the third person it could also be translated as "there is/are". Many verbs conjugations in Hindi-Urdu are derived from participles and hence are gendered and numbered, and they agree with either the object or the subject of the sentence depending on the grammatical case of the subject of the sentence. When the subject is in the ergative or the dative case (seeː dative construction & quirky subject) the verb agrees in gender and number with the object of the sentence and with the subject when the subject is in the nominative case.

PERSONAL FORMS of "honā (to be)"
mood	tense	first person		second person					
mood	tense	singular		familiar^{1,2}		intimate		formal^{1,2,3}	
mood	tense	♂	♀	♂	♀	♂	♀	♂	♀
indicative	present	hū̃		ho		hai		ha͠i	
indicative	perfect	huā	huī	hue	huī	huā	huī	hue	huī̃
indicative	imperfect	thā	thī	the	thī	thā	thī	the	thī̃
indicative	future	hoū̃gā	hoū̃gī	hooge	hoogī	hoegā	hoegī	hoẽge	hoẽgī
presumptive	all	hū̃gā	hū̃gī	hoge	hogī	hogā	hogī	hõge	hõgī
subjunctive	present	hū̃		ho		ho		hõ	
subjunctive	future	hoū̃		hoo		hoe		hoẽ	
subjunctive	future^{5}	huā	huī	hue	huī	huā	huī	hue	huī̃
contrafactual	past	hotā	hotī	hote	hotī	hotā	hotī	hote	hotī̃
imperative	present	—		hoo		ho		hoiye	
imperative	future	—		honā		hoiyo		hoiyegā	

IMPERSONAL FORMS of "honā (to be)"
Stem	ho			
Infinitive	honā			
Oblique Infinitive	hone			
Conjunctive	hokar, hoke			
Progressive	hote-hote			
PARTICIPLES	♂		♀	
PARTICIPLES	singular	plural	singular	plural
Infinitive	honā	hone	honī	honī̃
Prospective	honevālā	honevāle	honevālī	honevālī̃
Agentive	honevālā	honevāle	honevālī	honevālī̃
Habitual Aspect	hotā	hote	hotī	hotī̃
Perfective Aspect	huā	hue	huī	huī̃
Perfective Adjectival^{4}	huā-huā	hue-hue	huī-huī	huī-huī̃
Imperfective Adjectival^{4}	hotā-huā	hote-hue	hotī-huī	hotī-huī̃

^{1} the second person familiar and formal conjugations are grammatically plural and can be used in both singular and plural sense, akin to the English pronoun you.
^{2} the third person singular and plural conjugations are respectively the same as the second person intimate and formal conjugations.
^{3} the first person plural pronoun conjugations are the same as the second person formal conjugations.
^{4} the second (adjoined) part of the adjectival participles -huā, -hue, -huī & -huī̃ are respectively shortened to -wā, -we, -wī & -wī̃ in speech.
^{5} the future perfective subjunctive has the same form as the indicative perfect. It is only used with if-clauses and relative clauses.

===== Bengali =====
Bengali is considered a zero copula language, however there are notable exceptions. In the simple present tense there is no verb connecting the subject to the predicative (the "zero verb" copula) but when the predicate expresses ideas of existence, location, or possession, for such cases the verb আছ- (ach) can be roughly translated as "to exist" or "to be present".

- In the past tense, the incomplete verb আছ- (ach) is always used as the copula, regardless of the nature of the predicative.
- For the future tense and non-finite structures, the copula is supplied by the verb হওয়া (howa), with the exceptions being the possessive and locative predicatives for which the verb থাকা (thaka, "to remain") is utilized.
- Bengali does not have a verb for possession (i.e. "to have", "to own"). Instead, possession in Bengali is expressed by the verb আছ- (āch) (for present and past tenses) and the verb থাকা (thaka) (for future tense) inflected with the possessed object and a genitive case for the possessor.

Bengali verbs are highly inflected and are regular with only few exceptions. They consist of a stem and an ending; they are traditionally listed in Bengali dictionaries in their "verbal noun" form, which is usually formed by adding -a to the stem: for instance, করা (kôra, to do) is formed from the stem কর (kôr). The stem can end in either a vowel or a consonant.

===== Nepali =====
The copula verb of Nepali has two sets of conjugations. The हो (ho) set is used in sentences that equate two things, like त्यो किताब हो (tyo kitāb ho, “That is a book.”) The छ (cha) set is used in sentences that describe something, or locate where something is, like त्यो ठूलो छ (tyo ṭhūlo cha, “That is big.”). Singular present tense forms of the copulas in Nepali are shown in the table below:

Pronoun			हो (ho, “define/identify”)		छ (cha, “describe/qualify”)	
Pronoun			Positive	Negative	Positive	Negative
1st		म (ma)	हुँ (hũ)	होइन (hoina)	छुँ (chũ)	छैन (chaina)
2nd	Familiar	तिमी (timī)	हौ (hau)	होइनौ (hoinau)	छौ (chau)	छैनौ (chainau)
2nd	Formal	तपाईं (tapāīṃ)	हुनुहुन्छ (hunuhuncha)	हुनुहुन्न (hunuhunna)	हुनुहुन्छ (hunuhuncha)	हुनुहुन्न (hunuhunna)
3rd	Familiar	यो (yo) / त्यो (tyo)	हो (ho)	होइन (hoina)	छ (cha)	छैन (chaina)
3rd	Formal	वहाँ (vahā̃)	हुनुहुन्छ (hunuhuncha)	हुनुहुन्न (hunuhunna)	हुनुहुन्छ (hunuhuncha)	हुनुहुन्न (hunuhunna)

==== Iranic languages ====
===== Persian =====
With regard to the function of the verb ‘to be’ as a copula, the most conspicuous feature of Modern Persian language is the evolution of an existential be, hast (exists), out of ast (is). In fact, when studying the forms and functions of ‘to be’, one might find certain characteristics specific to Persian that are worth pondering upon— i.e. even without considering the diachronic evolution of Modern Persian language and its relation to Ancient Iranian languages (such as Old Persian and Avestan) whose usage of the verb ‘to be’ seems more close to Sanskrit. Paradoxically, despite the fact that Persian is apparently the only Indo-European language that has created an existential be out of the copula, it has simultaneously made an extreme use of the latter to produce a general paradigm for conjugating all Persian verbs.

Historically speaking, like most of Indo-European languages that make use of suppletive roots to denote ‘to be’, Persian integrates Proto-Indo-European (PIE) verbs *h₁es- (to be) and *b^{h}uH (to grow> to become> to be). Hence, while Persian infinitive būdan (to be) < PIE *b^{h}uH forms the past stem of the verb (e.g. Persian būd- ‘was’) or acts as an auxiliary verb in formation of pluperfect of other verbs, its present tense is solely based on the derivatives of PIE *h₁es-. It is, in fact, from the declension of PIE *h₁es- (to be) that six present stems have been created and assigned to the 1st, 2nd, and 3rd person singular and plural to act as the present-tense conjugation of Persian būdan (to be), as shown in the following table.

	Persian	English	Persian	English
1st Person	-am	(I) am	-īm	(we) are
2nd Person	-ī	(thou) art	-īd	(you) are
3rd Person	ast (a)	(he/she/it) is	-and	(they) are

As an example, in the following sentences, the present forms of the verb 'to be' are used as copulas or predicates:

Persian	English
man doxtar-e to am.	I am thy daughter.
īn barādar-e man ast (a or e).	This is my brother.
to pedar-e man ī.	Thou art my father.

Furthermore, as endings added to the stem of the verbs, these declensional forms have been grammaticalized to shape a general paradigm for the grammatical conjugation of all other verbs; these endings were once auxiliary verbs which evolved into an enclitic. This generalized conjugational paradigm is also applied to the past tense of the verb būdan (shown in the table below). However, what is linguistically notable, is the emergence of an existential be out of the copula, viz hast (exists) out of ast (is). The evolution of this exceptional form, might go back to ancient Iranian languages, where ast could have two variants (cf. Avestan which has both as- and has- <PIE *h₁es- ‘be’). In the next phase, what we may call a pseudo-verb appeared, vis. the verb hastan (to exist) has been analogically evolved from hast (exists) and has been conjugated like any other Persian verb (e.g. hast-am = literally: *‘(I) am existence’→ ‘I exist’).

The simple past conjugation of the verb būdan (to be) is in fact formed by a double-copula, in the sense that both the stem and the ending are copulas: the past stem of the verb būd- is derived from PIE *b^{h}uH-, while the endings are from the suppletive form of PIE *h₁es- (to be) with the exception of 3rd person singular which has zero ending for the all Persian verbs in the past tense.

Singular	English	Enclitic copula	Plural	English	Enclitic copula
būdam	I was	ام -am	būdīm	we were	ايم -īm
būdī	thou wast	اى -ī	būdīd	you were	اید -īd
būd (būda)	he/she/it was	Ø (a)	būdand	they were	اند -and

The present perfect conjugation of the verb būdan (to be) is a double copula paradigm as it is produced by addition of all enclitic copulas to the past participle of the verb: būde (been).

Singular	English	Enclitic copula	Plural	English	Enclitic copula
būdeam	I have been	-am	būdeīm	we have been	-īm
būdeī	thou hast been	-ī	būdeīd	you have been	-īd
būde ast (būde a)	he/she/it has been	ast (a)	būdeand	they have been	-and

The pseudo-verb hastan (to exist) has only simple present tense; in addition, it is truly and purely existencial only in the case of third person singular (hast). The fact is that the verb has been the product of this very case, as an "existential is", hast (he/she/it exists). For other persons the conjugation has to use enclitic copulas. These copulas are, in turn, derived from the declension of PIE *h₁es- (to be); as if the predicative "to be" has been an auxiliary verb turned into enclitic, to provide six endings for 1st/2nd/3rd person (singular & plural). However, as it is said, the 3rd person singular has no ending in the case of hastan. That is to say that the existential hast (exists), which is like the alter-ego of the copula ast (is), takes no ending, while the present stem of all other verbs take an archaic ending -ad in their 3rd person singular.

Singular	English	Enclitic copula	Plural	English	Enclitic copula
hastam	I exist	-am	hastīm	we exist	-īm
hastī	thou existest	-ī	hastīd	you exist	-īd
hast	he/she/it exists	{ad} > Ø (a)	hastand	they exist	-and

=== Hellenic languages ===
==== Greek ====
The Ancient Greek verb eimi (I am) is derived from the Indo-European root *h₁es-.

		Homeric Greek	Classical Attic	Modern Greek
Present indicative	1st sg. 2nd sg. 3rd sg. 1st pl. 2nd pl. 3rd pl.	εἰμί (eimi) εἶς, ἐσσί (eis, essi) ἐστί(ν) (esti(n)) εἰμέν (eimen) ἐστέ (este) εἰσί(ν), ἔασι (eisi(n), easi)	εἰμί (eimi) εἶ (ei) ἐστί(ν) (esti(n)) ἐσμέν (esmen) ἐστέ (este) εἰσί(ν) (eisi(n))	είμαι (ime) είσαι (ise) είναι (ine) είμαστε (imaste) είστε (iste) είναι (ine)
Preterite indicative	1st sg. 2nd sg. 3rd sg. 1st pl. 2nd pl. 3rd pl.	ἦα, ἔον (ēa, eon) ἦσθα, ἔησθα (ēstha, eēstha) ἦ(ε)ν, ἔην (ē(e)n, eēn) ἦμεν (ēmen) ἦτε (ēte) ἦσαν (ēsan)	ἦ(ν) (ē(n)) ἦς, ἦσθα (ēs, ēstha) ἦν (ēn) ἦμεν (ēmen) ἦστε, ἔατε (ēste, eate) ἦσαν ἔσαν (ēsan, esan)	ήμουν (imun) ήσουν (isun) ήταν (itan) ήμασταν (imaste, imastan) ήσασταν (isaste, isastan) ήταν, (ήσαν) (itan, [isan])
Subjunctive	1st sg. 2nd sg. 3rd sg. 1st pl. 2nd pl. 3rd pl.	ἔω (eō) ἔῃς, ἔοις (eēis, eois) ἔῃ(σι), ᾖσι(ν), ἔοι (eēi(si), ēisi(n), eoi) ἔωσι(ν) (eōsi(n))	ὦ (ō) ᾖς (ēis) ᾖ (ēi) ὦμεν (ōmen) ἦτε (ēte) ὦσι(ν) (ōsi(n))	να είμαι (na ime) να είσαι (na ise) να είναι (na ine) να είμαστε (na imaste) να είσαστε (na isaste) να είναι (na ine)
Optative	1st sg. 2nd sg. 3rd sg. 1st pl. 2nd pl. 3rd pl.	εἴην (eiēn) εἴης (eiēs) εἴη (eiē) εἶτε (eite) εἶεν (eien)	εἴην (eiēn) εἴης (eiēs) εἴη (eiē) εἴημεν, εἶμεν (ei(ē)men) εἴητε, εἶτε (ei(ē)te) εἴησαν, εἶεν (eiēsan, eien)	
Imperative	2nd sg. 3rd sg. 2nd pl. 3rd pl.	ἔσσο, ἴσθι (esso, isthi) ἔστε (este)	ἴσθι (isthi) ἔστω (estō) ἔστε (este) ἔστων, ὄντων (estōn, ontōn)	
Infinitive		εἶναι, ἔμ(μ)εν(αι) (einai, em(m)en(ai))	εἶναι (einai)	
Participle		ἐών, ἐόντ- (eōn, eont-) fem. ἐοῦσα (eousa)	ὦν, ὄντ- (ōn, ont-) fem. οὖσα (ousa)	όντας (ontas)

Dual is not shown in the table.

The participles are based on the full-grade stem ἐσ- in Homeric, according to Smyth.

=== Italic languages ===
Except for Latin, the older Italic languages are very scarcely attested, but we have in Oscan set (they are), fiiet (they become), fufans (they have been) and fust (he will be), and in Umbrian sent (they are). This section will explain Latin, and the Romance languages that have evolved from it.

Esse and the forms beginning with (e)s- are from the root *h₁es-, while the forms beginning with f- are from the root *bʰuH-. For the forms beginning with er-, see *h₁er-. Stāre is derived from the root *steh₂-.

In Spanish, Catalan, Galician-Portuguese and to a lesser extent, Italian there are two parallel paradigms, ser/èsser/essere from Latin esse "to be" on the one hand, and estar/stare from Latin stare, "to stand" on the other.

In several modern Romance languages, the perfect is a compound tense formed with the past participle as in English, but the old Latin perfect survives as a commonly used preterite in Spanish and Portuguese, and as a literary "past historic" in French, Italian and Catalan.

There is a tendency for a past participle derived from stare (or more specifically its supine, statum) to replace that of the main copula derived from esse. For example, the French participle été comes from statum.

		Latin		Old French		French	Spanish		Italian		Portuguese		Catalan		Romanian	Sicilian		Occitan
Infinitive		esse	stāre	estre	ester	être	ser	estar	essere	stare	ser	estar	ser, ésser	estar	a fi, fire	siri	stari	estre,èsser
Indicative	Present	sum es est sumus estis sunt	stō stās stat stāmus stātis stant	suis es est sommes estes sont	este estes este estons estez estent	suis es est sommes êtes sont	soy eres/sos es somos sois son	estoy estás está estamos estáis están	sono sei è siamo siete sono	sto stai sta stiamo state stanno	sou és é somos sois são	estou estás está estamos estais estão	sóc ets és som sou són	estic estàs està estem esteu estan	sunt eşti este suntem sunteţi sunt	sugnu sì esti simu siti sù	staiu stai sta stamu stati stannu	soi sès es sèm sètz son
Indicative	Preterite	fuī fuistī fuit fuimus fuistis fuērunt/fuēre	stetī stetistī stetit stetimus stetistis stetērunt/stetēre	fui fus fu fumes fustes furent	estai estas esta estames estastes esterent	fus fus fut fûmes fûtes furent	fui fuiste fue fuimos fuisteis fueron	estuve estuviste estuvo estuvimos estuvisteis estuvieron	fui fosti fu fummo foste furono	stetti stesti stette stemmo steste stettero	fui foste foi fomos fostes foram	estive estiveste esteve estivemos estivestes estiveram	fui fores fou fórem fóreu foren	estiguí estugueres estigué estiguérem estiguéreu estigueren	fusei/fui fuseși/fuși fuse/fu fuserăm/furăm fuserăți/furăți fuseră/fură	fui fusti fu fumu fùstivu furu	stesi stasti stesi stèsimu stàsivu stèsiru	foguèri foguères foguèt foguèrem foguèretz foguèron
Indicative	Imperfect	eram erās erat erāmus erātis erant	stābam stābās stābat stābāmus stābātis stābant	ier iers iert iermes seroiz ierent	estoie estoies estoit estiens estiez estoient	étais étais était étions étiez étaient	era eras era éramos erais eran	estaba estabas estaba estábamos estabais estaban	ero eri era eravamo eravate erano	stavo stavi stava stavamo stavate stavano	era eras era éramos éreis eram	estava estavas estava estávamos estaveis estavam	era eres era érem éreu eren	estava estaves estava estàvem estàveu estaven	eram erai era eram erați erau	era eri era èramu èravu èranu	stava stavi stava stàvamu stàstivu stàvanu	èri èras èra èram èratz èran
Indicative	Pluperfect	fueram fuerās fuerat fuerāmus fuerātis fuerant	steteram steterās steterāt steterāmus steterātis steterant	- - - - - -	- - - - - -	- - - - - -	- - - - - -	- - - - - -	- - - - - -	- - - - - -	fora foras fora fôramos fôreis foram	estivera estiveras estivera estivéramos estivéreis estiveram	- - - - - -	- - - - - -	fusesem fuseseși fusese fuseserăm fuseserăți fuseseră	- - - - - -	- - - - - -	- - - - - -
Indicative	Future	erō eris/ere erit erimus eritis erunt	stābō stābis stābit stābimus stābitis stabunt	serai seras sera serons serez seront	esterai	serai seras sera serons serez seront	seré serás será seremos seréis serán	estaré estarás estará estaremos estaréis estarán	sarò sarai sarà saremo sarete saranno	starò starai starà staremo starete staranno	serei serás será seremos sereis serão	estarei estarás estará estaremos estareis estarão	seré seràs serà serem sereu seram	estaré estaràs estarà estarem estareu estaran	voi fi vei fi va fi vom fi veți fi vor fi	- - - - - -	- - - - - -	serai seràs serà serem seretz seràn
Indicative	Future Perfect	fuerō fueris fuerit fuerimus fueritis fuerint	steterō steteris steterit steterimus steteritis steterint	- - - - - -	- - - - - -	- - - - - -	- - - - - -	- - - - - -	- - - - - -	- - - - - -	- - - - - -	- - - - - -	- - - - - -	- - - - - -	- - - - - -	- - - - - -	- - - - - -	- - - - - -
Subjunctive	Present	sim sīs sit sīmus sītis sint	stem stēs stet stēmus stētis stent	soie soies soit soions soiiez soient	estoise estoises estoise estons estez estoisent	sois sois soit soyons soyez soient	sea seas sea seamos seáis sean	esté estés esté estemos estéis estén	sia sia sia siamo siate siano	stia stia stia stiamo stiate stiano	seja sejas seja sejamos sejais sejam	esteja estejas esteja estejamos estejais estejam	sigui/siga siguis/sigues sigui/siga siguem sigueu siguin/siguen	estigui/estiga estiguis/estugues estugui/estiga estiguem estigueu estiguin/estiguen	să fiu să fii să fie să fim să fiți să fie	fussi fussi fussi fùssimu fùssivu fùssiru	stassi stassi stassi stàssimu stàssivu stàssiru	siá siás siá siam siatz sián
Subjunctive	Imperfect	essem/forem essēs/forēs esset/foret essēmus/forēmus essetis/forētis essent/forent	stārem stārēs stāret stārēmus stārētis stārent	fusse fusses fust fussons fussiez fussent	esteüsse esteüsses esteüst esteüssons esteüssoiz esteüssent	fusse fusses fût fussions fussiez fussent	fuera/fuese fueras/fueses fuera/fuese fuéramos/fuésemos fuerais/fueseis fueran/fuesen	estuviera/estuviese estuvieras/estuvieses estuviera/estuviese estuviéramos/estuviésemos estuvierais/estuvieseis estuvieran/estuviesen	fossi fossi fosse fossimo foste fossero	stessi stessi stesse stessimo steste stessero	fosse fosses fosse fôssemos fôsseis fossem	estivesse estivesses estivesse estivéssemos estivésseis estivessem	fos fossis fos fóssim/fóssem fóssiu/fósseu fossin/fossen	estigués estiguessis estigués estiguéssim/estiguéssem estiguéssiu/estiguésseu estiguessin/estiguessen	să fi fost să fi fost să fi fost să fi fost să fi fost să fi fost	fussi fussi fussi fùssimu fùssivu fùssiru	stassi stassi stassi stàssimu stàssivu stàssiru	foguèsse foguèsses foguèsse foguèssem foguèssetz foguèsson
Subjunctive	Future	- - - - - -	- - - - - -	- - - - - -	- - - - - -	- - - - - -	fuere fueres fuere fuéremos fuereis fueren	estuviere estuvieres estuviere estuviéremos estuviereis estuvieren	- - - - - -	- - - - - -	for fores for formos fordes forem	estiver estiveres estiver estivermos estiverdes estiverem	- - - - - -	- - - - - -	- - - - - -	- - - - - -	- - - - - -	- - - - - -
Conditional		- - - - - -	- - - - - -	seroie seroies seroit seriens seriez seroient	esteroie esteroies esteroit esteriiens esteriiez esteroient	serais serais serait serions seriez seraient	sería serías sería seríamos seríais serían	estaría estarías estaría estaríamos estaríais estarían	sarei saresti sarebbe saremmo sareste sarebbero	starei staresti starebbe staremmo stareste starebbero	seria serias seria seríamos seríeis seriam	estaria estarias estaria estaríamos estaríeis estariam	seria/fóra series/fores seria/fóra seríem/fórem seríeu/fóreu serien/foren	estaria estaries estaria estaríem estaríeu estarien	aș fi ai fi ar fi am fi ați fi ar fi	fora fori fora fòramu fòravu fòranu	- - - - - -	- - - - - -
Imperative	Present	- es - - este -	- stā - - stāte -	- soies - soiiens soiiez -	- esta - estons estez -	- sois - soyons soyez -	- sé - seamos sed/sean -	- está - estemos estad/estén -	- sii - - siate -	- sta - - state -	- sê - - sede -	- está - - estai -	- sigues - - sigueu/sigau -	- estigues - - estigueu/estigau -	- fii - - fiți -	- sì - - siti -	- stai - - stati -	- siá - siam siatz -
Imperative	Future	- estō estō - estōte suntō	- stātō stātō - stātōte stantō	- - - - - -	- - - - - -	- - - - - -	- - - - - -	- - - - - -	- - - - - -	- - - - - -	- - - - - -	- - - - - -	- - - - - -	- - - - - -	- - - - - -	- - - - - -	- - - - - -	- - - - - -
Past participle		fuisse	statum	esté	esté	été	sido	estado	stato/essuto	stato	sido	estado	estat/sigut/sét	estat	fost	statu	statu	estat, estada
Present Participle		esse	stāns	estant	estant	étant	siendo	estando	essendo	stando	sendo	estando	sent/essent	estant	fiind	sennu	sannu	essent
		Latin		Old French		French	Spanish		Italian		Portuguese		Catalan		Romanian	Sicilian		Occitan

=== Germanic languages ===
The proto-Germanic verb for 'to be', *wesaną, and its conjugations are mostly derived from the Proto-Indo-European verb *h₂wes (‘stay overnight, camp’). The present subjunctive stem is derived from the optative of *h₁es-. West Germanic languages also have an additional stem *bi- (such as 'to be' in English), which is thought to derive from the PIE stem *bʰuh₂- ('become'). Proto-Germanic retained the dual, but only in the first and second person.

	Proto-Germanic (reconstructed)		Gothic	Old Norse	Icelandic	Faroese	Norwegian Nynorsk	Norwegian Bokmål + Danish		Old Swedish	Swedish	Old English		English	Old High German	German	Luxem- burgish	Old Saxon	Dutch
Infinitive	*wesaną	*beuną?	wisan	vera	vera	vera	vera/vere	være		vara	vara	wesan	bēon	be	wesan	sein	sinn	wesan	zijn/wezen
Present indicative	*immi *izi *isti *izū *izudiz *izum *izud *sindi	*biumi *biusi *biuþi *beū? *biuþiz *beum *beuþ *biunþi	im is ist siju sijuts sijum sijuþ sind	em ert (est) er (es) – – erum eruð eru	er ert er – – erum eruð eru	eri ert er – – eru eru eru	er er er – – er er er	er er er – – er er er		æm/ær æst ær – – ærum ærin æru	är (äm) är (äst) är – – är (äro) är (ären) är (äro)	eom eart is – – sint sint sint	bēo bist biþ – – bēoþ bēoþ bēoþ	am art is – – are are are	bim, bin bist ist – – birum, bir(e)n birut, bir(e)t sint	bin bist ist – – sind seid sind	si(nn) bass ass – – si(nn) sidd si(nn)	bium bist is – – sind sind sind	ben – is – – zijn bent/zijt* zijn
Present subjunctive	*sijǭ *sijēs *sijē *sīw *sīþiz *sīm *sīþ *sīn	*biwjǭ? *biwjēs? *biwjē? *biwīw *biwīþiz *biwīm *biwīþ *biwīn	sijau sijais sijai sijaiwa sijaits sijaima sijaiþ sijaina	sjá sér sé – – sém séð sé	sé sért sé – – séum séuð séu	veri veri veri – – veri veri veri	– – (vere) – – – – –	– – (være) – – – – –		– – sē(i)/vari – – – – sēi(n)/vari(n)	– – (vare) – – – – –	sīe sīe sīe – – sīen sīen sīen	bēo bēo bēo – – bēon bēon bēon	be be be – – be be be	sī sīs(t) sī – – sīm, sīn sī(n)t sīn	sei sei(e)st sei – – seien seiet seien	– – sief – – – – –	sī sīs(t) sī – – sīn sīn sīn	zij – zij – – zijn zij zijn
Preterite indicative	*was *wast *was *wēzū *wēzudiz *wēzum *wēzud *wēzun		was wast was wēsu wēsuts wēsum wēsuþ wēsun	var varst var – – várum várið váru	var varst var – – vorum voruð voru	var vart var – – vóru vóru vóru	var var var – – var var var	var var var – – var var var		var vast var – – vārum vārin vāru	var var var – – var (voro) var (voren) var (voro)	wæs wǣre wæs – – wǣron wǣron wǣron		was wast was – – were were were	was wāri was – – wārum wārut wārun	war warst war – – waren wart waren	war waars war – – ware(n) waart ware(n)	was wāri was – – wārun wārun wārun	was – was – – waren was/waart* waren
Preterite subjunctive	*wēzį̄ *wēzīz *wēzī *wēzīw *wēzīdiz *wēzīm *wēzīd *wēzīn		wēsjau wēseis wēsi wēseiwa wēseits wēseima wēseiþ wēseina	væra værir væri – – værim værið væri	væri værir væri – – værum væruð væru	væri væri væri – – væri væri væri	– – – – – – – –	var var var – – var var var		– – vāri – – – – vāri(n)	vore vore vore – – vore vore (-en) vore	wǣre wǣre wǣre – – wǣren wǣren wǣren		were wert were – – were were were	wāri wārīs wāri – – wārīm wārīt wārīn	wäre wärest wäre – – wären wäret wären	wier wiers wier – – wiere(n) wiert wiere(n)	wāri wāris wāri – – wārin wārin wārin	ware – ware – – waren ware waren
Imperative	- *wes *wesadau - *wesadiz - *wisid *wesandau		- wis wisadau – wisats - wisiþ wisandau	- ver ver – – – verið verið	- vertu vertu – – - verið verið	- ver ver – – - verið verið	– ver ver – – – ver ver	- vær vær – – - vær vær		– - - – – – – -	- var var – – - var var	- wes wes – – - wesaþ wesaþ		- be be – – - be be	- wes wes – – - wesit wesit	- sei sei – – - seid seid	- - - – – - - -	- wes wes – – - wesad wesad	- wees - – – - weest -
Past participle	–		–	verit	verið	verið	vore (vori)	vært	været	varin	varit	–		been	giwesan	gewesen	gewiescht	(gi)wesan	geweest

- Old English kept the verbs wesan and bēon separate throughout the present stem, though it is not clear that the kind of consistent distinction in usage was made that we find, for example in Spanish. In the preterite, however, the paradigms fell together. Old English has no participle for this verb.
- The plural forms in Modern Swedish (indicated in brackets) were in common use in formal written language until the mid-20th century, but are now no longer in use except in deliberately archaising texts. The preterite subjunctive is also increasingly being replaced by the indicative, or past participle.
- Dutch, like English, has abandoned the original second-person singular forms, replacing them with the second-person plural forms. However, while in English the old forms are still in limited and deliberately archaic use, in Dutch they have disappeared entirely and are no longer known or used at all. The forms listed in the plural are the historical plural forms, the 'jij' and 'gij' forms. Dutch formed a new plural pronoun 'jullie' with inflection similar to the 1st and 3rd person plural, but it would be redundant to list them here.

=== Slavic languages ===
	Proto-Slavic (reconstructed)	Old Church Slavonic	Ukrainian	Russian	Old Polish	Polish	Czech	Slovak	Slovenian	Serbo-Croatian	Bulgarian
Present	*(j)esmĭ *(j)esi *(j)estĭ *(j)esvě *(j)esta *(j)este *(j)esmŭ *(j)este *sǫtĭ	ѥсмь, jesmĭ ѥси, jesi ѥстъ, jestŭ ѥсвѣ, jesvě ѥста, jesta ѥсте, jeste ѥсмъ, jesmŭ ѥсте, jeste сѫтъ, sǫtŭ	(є[сь]м, je[ś]m) (єси, jesy) є, je /{єсть, jesť} – – – ((є)сьмо, (je)śmo) ((є)сте, (je)ste) (суть, suť)	(есмь, jesm') (еси, jesi) есть, jest' – – – (есмо, jesmo) (есте, jeste) (суть, sut')	jeśm jeś jest, jeść – – – jeśmy jeście są	jestem, -m jesteś, -ś jest – – – jesteśmy, -śmy jesteście, -ście są	jsem jsi je – – – jsme jste jsou	som si je – – – sme ste sú	sem si je sva sta sta smo ste so	jesam, sam/budem* jesi, si/budeš jest, je/bude – – – jesmo, smo/budemo jeste, ste/budete jesu, su/budu	съм, səm си, si е, e – – – сме, sme сте, ste са, sə
Imperative	– *bǫdi *bǫdi *bǫděvě *bǫděta – *bǫděmŭ *bǫděte *bǫdǫ	– бѫди, bǫdi бѫди, bǫdi бѫдѣвѣ, bǫděvě бѫдѣта, bǫděta – бѫдѣмъ, bǫděmŭ бѫдѣте, bǫděte бѫдѫ, bǫdǫ	– будь, buď – – – – будьмо, buďmo будьте, buďte –	– будь, bud’ – – – – – будьте, bud’te –	– bądź – – – – bądźmy bądźcie –	– bywaj/bądź – – – – bywajmy/bądźmy bywajcie/bądźcie –	– buď – – – – buďme buďte –	– buď – – – – buďme buďte –	– bodi – bodiva bodita – bodimo bodite –	– budi (neka bude) – – – budimo budite (neka budu)	– бъди, bədi – – – – – бъдете, bədete –
Future	*bǫdǫ *bǫdešĭ *bǫdetĭ *bǫdevě *bǫdeta *bǫdete *bǫdemŭ *bǫdete *bǫdǫtĭ	бѫдѫ, bǫdǫ бѫдеши, bǫdeši бѫдетъ, bǫdetŭ бѫдевѣ, bǫdevě бѫдета, bǫdeta бѫдете, bǫdete бѫдемъ, bǫdemŭ бѫдете, bǫdete бѫдѫтъ, bǫdǫtŭ	буду, budu будеш, budeš буде, bude – – – будемо, budemo будете, budete будуть, buduť	буду, budu будешь, budeš' будет, budet – – – будем, budem будете, budete будут, budut	będę będziesz będzie – – – będziemy będziecie będą	będę będziesz będzie – – – będziemy będziecie będą	budu budeš bude – – – budeme budete budou	budem budeš bude – – – budeme budete budú	bom, bodem boš, bodeš bo, bode bova, bodeva bosta, bodesta bosta, bodesta bomo, bodemo boste, bodeste bodo, bojo	budem budeš bude – – – budemo budete budu	ще бъда, šte bədə ще бъдеш, šte bədeš ще бъде, šte bəde – – – ще бъдем, šte bədem ще бъдете, šte bədete ще бъдат, šte bədət
Imperfect	*běaxŭ *běaše *běaše *běaxově *běašeta *běašete *běaxomŭ *běašete *běaxǫ	бѣахъ, běaxŭ бѣаше, běaše бѣаше, běaše бѣаховѣ, běaxově бѣашета, běašeta бѣашете, běašete бѣахомъ, běaxomŭ бѣашете, běašeте бѣахѫ, běaxǫ			biech biesze biesze – – – biechom bieszecie biechą					bijah, b(j)eh bijaše, b(j)eše bijaše, b(j)eše – – – bijasmo, b(j)esmo bijaste, b(j)este bijahu, b(j)ehu	бях, bjah бе[ше], be[še] бе[ше], be[še] – – – бяхме, bjahme бяхте, bjahte бяха, bjahə
Aorist	*byxŭ *by(stŭ?) *by(stŭ?) *byxově *bysta *byste *byxomŭ *byste *byšę	бꙑхъ, byxŭ бꙑ(стъ), by(stŭ) бꙑ(стъ) by(stŭ) бꙑховѣ, byxově бꙑста, bysta бꙑсте, byste бꙑхомъ, byxomŭ бꙑсте, byste бꙑшѧ, byšę			bych by by – – – bychom byście bychą						
Conditional copula						bym byś by – – – byśmy byście by	bych bys by – – – bychom byste by		(bi) bi bi (bi) (bi) (bi) (bi) (bi) (bi)	bih bi bi – – – bismo biste biše	бих, bih би, bi би, bi – – – бихме, bihme бихте, bihte биха, bihə
Present active participle	*sy m. *sǫťi f. *sy n.	сꙑ, sy m. сѫщи, sǫšti f. сꙑ, sy n.			sący m. sąca f. sące n.		jsoucí				(същ, səšt m.) (съща, səšta f.) (също, səšto n.)
Future active participle	*bǫdy m. *bǫdǫťi f. *bǫdy n.	бѫдꙑ, bǫdy m. бѫдѫщи, bǫdǫšti f. бѫдꙑ, bǫdy n.		будущий, buduščij m. будущая, buduščaja f. будущее, buduščeje n.	będący m. będąca f. będące n.	będący m. będąca f. będące n.	budoucí m. budoucí f. budoucí n.	budúci m. budúca f. budúce n.	bodoči m. bodoča f. bodoče n.	budući m. buduća f. buduće n.	(бъдещ, bədešt m.) (бъдещa, bədeštа f.) (бъдещо, bədeštо n.)
Present gerund			будучи		sąc będąc	będąc	jsa jsouc jsouce				бъдейки
Past active participle	*byvŭ m. *byvŭši f. *byvŭ n.	бꙑвъ, byvŭ m. бꙑвъши, byvŭši f. бꙑвъ, byvŭ n.		бывший, byvšij m. бывшая, byvšaja f. бывшее, byvšeje n.	bywszy m. bywsza f. bywsze n.	bywszy m. bywsza f. bywsze n.		byvší m. byvšia f. byvšie n.	bivši m. bivša f. bivše n.	bivši m. bivša f. bivše n.	(бивш, bivš m.) (бивша, bivša f.) (бивше, bivše n.)
Past gerund			бувши		bywszy	bywszy	byv byvši byvše				-
Resultative participle	*bylŭ m. *byla f. *bylo n.	бꙑлъ, bylŭ m. бꙑла, byla f. бꙑло, bylo n.	був, buw m. була, bula f. було, bulo n.	был, byl m. была, byla f. было, bylo n.	był m. była f. było n.	był m. była f. było n.	byl m. byla f. bylo n.	bol m. bola f. bolo n.	bil m. bila f. bilo n.	bio m. bila f. bilo n.	бил, bil m. била, bila f. било, bilo n.
Verbal or deverbal noun	*bytĭje	бꙑтиѥ, bytije	буття́, buttja	бытьё, bytʹjó	bycie	bycie	bytí	bytie	bītje	biće	-
Infinitive	*byti	бꙑти, byti	бути, buty	быть, byt'	być	być	být	byť	biti	biti	-
Supine	-	-	-	-	-	-	-	-	bit	-	-

- In Russian, the present forms are archaic and no longer in common use, except for the third person forms, which are used in "there is/are" type phrases.
- In Ukrainian, the present tense forms of the verb "бути" have all but disappeared from contemporary language, except for the third person form which is used in existential phrases; єсть (jesť) is archaic and encountered only in poetry. All participles have turned into other parts of speech, future and past active participles becoming present and past active adverbial participle respectively, and resultative pariciple becoming past tense of verbs.
- In Serbo-Croatian the forms jesam, jesi, jeste and so on are used as the basic form of the Present Tense "to be" (i.e. I am, you are etc.), while the forms budem, budeš, bude etc. are used only for the formation of the Future Perfect.
- In Bulgarian, forms бъда, бъдеш, etc. are not used by themselves but only in compound forms (future ще бъда, subjunctive да бъда). In this respect they closely follow the usage (and non-usage) of perfective verbs. As such it has its own forms for the aorist (бидох, биде, биде, бидохме, бидохте, 'бидоха), the imperfect (бъдех, бъдеше, бъдеше, бъдехме, бъдехте, бъдеха) and the resultative participle (бъдел). Another verb - бивам with fully regular conjugation type III paradigm - completes an aspect triple: imperfective съм, perfective бъда, secondary imperfective бивам. The perfective aorist has lost its original meaning and is now used only to form the compound conditional mood (бих чел = I would read). All participles except the resultative participle (бил) have lost their function and are now used as regular adjectives with changed meanings (същ = same, бивш = previous, ex-, бъдещ = future).
- In Polish, the present forms, except for jest and są, have turned into suffixes (-m, -ś, -śmy, -ście) used primarily to construct the past tense and the conditional clitic. The modern conjugation comes from attaching these suffixes onto the third person singular form jest.

=== Baltic languages ===
	Lithuanian	Latvian
Infinitive	būti	būt
Present	esu, esmi (rare), esmì (obsol.), būnu esì, būni (rare) yra, esti, estì (obsol.), esa (rare), būna esmè (obsol.), esame, būname (rare) estè (obsol.), esate, būnate (rare) yra, esti (rare), esa (rare), būna (rare)	esmu, esu (vernacular) esi ir esam esat ir
Past simple	buvau buvai buvo buvome buvote buvo	biju biji bija bijām bijāt bija
Past active participle	buvęs (m. sg.) buvusi (f. sg.) buvę (m. pl.) buvusios (f. pl.)	bijis (m. sg.) bijusi (f. sg.) bijuši (m. pl.) bijušas (f. pl.)
Future	būsiu būsi bus būsime būsite bus	būšu būsi būs būsim būsiet, būsit būs
Imperative	– būk – būkime būkite –	– esi – būsim esiet –
Quotative		esot, būšot
Conditional	būčiau būtum būtų būtumėme būtumėte būtų	būtu

In Lithuanian, the paradigm būnu, būni, būna, etc. is not considered archaic or dialectal but rather a special use of the verb būti, to be, mostly used to describe repeated actions or states, or habits.

=== Celtic languages ===
In the Celtic languages there is a distinction between the so-called substantive verb, used when the predicate is an adjective phrase or prepositional phrase, and the so-called copula, used when the predicate is a noun.

The conjugation of the Old Irish and Middle Welsh verbs is as follows:

	Old Irish substantive verb	Old Irish copula	Middle Welsh
Present	(at)·tó (at)·taí (at)·tá (at)·taam (at)·taïd (at)·taat	am at is ammi adib it	wyf wyt yw, mae, taw, oes ym ych ynt, maen(t)
Preterite	·bá ·bá ·boí ·bámmar ·baid ·bátar	basa basa ba bommar unattested batar	buum buost bu buam buawch buant
Future	bia bie bieid, ·bia beimmi, ·biam bethe, ·bieid bieit, ·biat	be be bid bimmi unattested bit	bydaf bydy byd bydwn bydwch bydant

The forms of the Old Irish present tense of the substantive verb, as well as Welsh taw, come from the PIE root *stā-. The other forms are from the roots *es- and *bhū-. Welsh mae originally meant "here is" (cf. yma 'here').

==== Irish and Scottish Gaelic ====
In modern Gaelic, person inflections have almost disappeared, but the negative and interrogative are marked by distinctive forms. In Irish, particularly in the south, person inflections are still very common for the tá/bhí series. (Note: Colin Mark has suggested that the Scots Gaelic substantive verb forms can be treated as assertive forms of the copula; since the verb is in any case suppletive, this is a matter of perspective.)

===== The verb bí =====
		Scottish Gaelic	Irish		
		Scottish Gaelic	(analytic)	(synthetic)	
Present	affirmative	tha	tá	1 táim, 2 †táir, 3 tá, 1pl táimíd, 2pl †táthaoi, 3pl táid	
Present	negative	chan eil	níl (< ní fhuil)	1 nílim, 2 †nílir, 3 níl, 1pl nílimíd, 2pl †níltí, 3pl nílid	
Present	interrogative	a bheil	an bhfuil	1 an bhfuilim, 2 †an bhfuilir, 3 an bhfuil, 1pl an bhfuilimíd, 2pl †an bhfuiltí, 3pl an bhfuilid	
Present	negative interrogative	nach eil	nach bhfuil	1 nach bhuilim, 2 †nach bhfuilir, 3 nach bhfuil, 1pl nach bhfuílimíd, 2pl †nach bhfuiltí, 3pl nach bhfuilid	
Past	affirmative	bha	bhí	1 bhíos, 2 bhís, 3 bhí, 1pl bhiomair, 2pl bhíobhair, 3pl bhíodar	
Past	negative	cha robh	ní raibh	ní	1 rabhas, 2 rabhais, 3 raibh, 1pl rabhamair, 2pl rabhabhair, 3pl rabhadar
Past	interrogative	an robh	an raibh	an	1 rabhas, 2 rabhais, 3 raibh, 1pl rabhamair, 2pl rabhabhair, 3pl rabhadar
Past	negative interrogative	nach robh	nach raibh	nach	1 rabhas, 2 rabhais, 3 raibh, 1pl rabhamair, 2pl rabhabhair, 3pl rabhadar
Future	affirmative	bidh (or "bithidh")	beidh	1 bead, 2 beir, 3 beidh, 1pl beimíd, 2pl beidh sibh, 3pl beid	
Future	negative	cha bhi	ní bheidh	ní	1 bhead, 2 bheir, 3 bheidh, 1pl bheimíd, 2pl bheidh sibh, 3pl bheid
Future	interrogative	am bi	an mbeidh	an	1 mbead, 2 mbeir, 3 mbeidh, 1pl mbeimíd, 2pl mbeidh sibh, 3pl mbeid
Future	negative interrogative	nach bi	nach mbeidh	nach	1 mbead, 2 mbeir, 3 mbeidh, 1pl mbeimíd, 2pl mbeidh sibh, 3pl mbeid

† archaic forms

Gaelic (bh)eil and Irish (bh)fuil are from Old Irish fuil, originally an imperative meaning "see!" (PIE root *wel-, also in Welsh gweled, Germanic wlitu- "appearance", and Latin voltus "face"), then coming to mean "here is" (cf. French voici < vois ci and voilà < vois là), later becoming a suppletive dependent form of at-tá. Gaelic robh and Modern Irish raibh are from the perfective particle ro (ry in Welsh) plus ba (lenited after ro).

===== The copula =====
		Scottish Gaelic		Irish	
		Before a consonant	Before a vowel	Before a consonant	Before a vowel
Present	affirmative interrogative negative negative interrogative	is		is an ní nach	is an ní nach
Past/Conditional	affirmative interrogative negative negative interrogative	bu		ba ar níor nár	b' arbh níorbh nárbh

==== Modern Welsh ====
The present tense in particular shows a split between the North and the South. Though the situation is undoubtedly more complicated, King (2003) notes the following variations in the present tense as spoken (not as written according to the standard orthography):

		Affirmative (I am)		Interrogative (Am I?)		Negative (I am not)	
		Singular	Plural	Singular	Plural	Singular	Plural
North	First person	dw	dan	ydw?	ydan?	(dy)dw	(dy)dan
North	Second person	—, (r)wyt	dach	wyt?	(y)dach?	dwyt	(dy)dach
North	Third person	mae	maen	ydy?	ydyn?	dydy	dydyn
South	First person	rw, w	ŷn, —	ydw?	ŷn?	(d)w	ŷn
South	Second person	—, (r)wyt	ych	wyt?	ych?	—	(ych)
South	Third person	mae	maen	ydy?, yw?	ŷn?	dyw	ŷn

For example, the spoken first person singular dw i'n is a contraction of the formal written yr ydwyf fi yn . The Welsh F /v/ is the fricative analogue of the nasal /m/, the PIE suffix consonant for the first person singular.

		Affirmative (I am)		Interrogative (Am I?)		Negative (I am not)	
		Singular	Plural	Singular	Plural	Singular	Plural
Preterite	First person	bues	buon	fues?	fuon?	fues	fuon
Preterite	Second person	buest	buoch	fuest?	fuoch?	fuest	fuoch
Preterite	Third person	buodd	buon	fuodd?	fuon?	fuodd	fuon
Imperfect	First person	roeddwn	roedden	oeddwn?	oedden?	doeddwn	doedden
Imperfect	Second person	roeddet	roeddech	oeddet?	oeddech?	doeddet	doeddech
Imperfect	Third person	roedd	roeddyn	oedd?	oeddyn?	doedd	doeddyn
Future	First person	bydda	byddwn	fydda?	fyddwn?	fydda	fyddwn
Future	Second person	byddi	byddwch	fyddi?	fyddwch?	fyddi	fyddwch
Future	Third person	bydd	byddan	fydd?	fyddan?	fydd	fyddan

Bod also has a conditional, for which there are two stems. The bas- stem is more common in the North, and the bydd- stem is more common in the South:

		Affirmative		Interrogative		Negative	
		Singular	Plural	Singular	Plural	Singular	Plural
bydd-	First person	byddwn	bydden	fyddwn	fydden	fyddwn?	fydden?
bydd-	Second person	byddet	byddech	fyddet	fyddech	fyddet?	fyddech?
bydd-	Third person	byddai	bydden	fyddai	fydden	fyddai?	fydden?
bas-	First person	baswn	basen	faswn	fasen	faswn?	fasen?
bas-	Second person	baset	basech	faset	fasech	faset?	fasech?
bas-	Third person	basai	basen	fasai	fasen	fasai?	fasen?

=== Hittite ===
The Hittite verb "to be" is derived from the Indo-European root *h₁es-.

	Present indicative	Preterite indicative	Imperative
1st sg.	ēšmi	ešun	ēšlit ēšlut ašallu
2nd sg.	ēšši	ēšta	ēš
3rd sg.	ēšzi	ēšta	ēšdu
1st pl.	(ašweni)	ēšwen	–
2nd pl.	ēšteni	ēšten	ēšten
3rd pl.	ašanzi	ešer	ašandu

=== Armenian ===
The Classical Armenian present tense derives from PIE *h₁es- (cf. sg. *h₁esmi, *h₁essi, *h₁esti; 3rd pl. *h₁s-énti).

	present
1st sg.	em
2nd sg.	es
3rd sg.	ē
1st pl.	enkʿ
2nd pl.	ēkʿ
3rd pl.	en

=== Albanian ===
The Albanian copula shows two distinct roots. The present jam ‘I am’ is an athematic root stem built from PIE *h₁es-. The imperfect continues the PIE imperfect of the same root but was rebuilt based on the 3rd person singular and plural. The preterite, on the other hand, comes from the thematic aorist of PIE *kʷel- ‘turn’ (cf. Ancient Greek épleto ‘he turned’, Armenian eɫew ‘he became’, Old Irish cloïd ‘turns back, defeats’). Analogical or otherwise indirect reflexes are italicized below.

	PIE	present	PIE → PAlb	rebuilt	imperfect (NE Arvanitic)	imperfect (standard Alb)	PIE → PAlb	preterite
1st sg.	*h₁ésmi	jam	*h₁és-m̥ → *eham	*eśen	jeshë	isha	*kʷl-e-m̥ → *klen^{†}	qeshë, OAlb qeva
2nd sg.	*h₁ési	je	*h₁és → *eh	*eśeh	jeshe	ishe	*kʷl-e-s → *kleh	qe
3rd sg.	*h₁ésti	ishtë (dial.) ësht (standard)	*h₁és-t → *eśt	*eśt	je	ish → ishte	*kʷl-e-to → *kleta	kle → qe
1st pl.	*h₁s-méi	jemi	*h₁s-m̥é → *emma/e	*eśema/e	jeshëmë	ishim	*kʷl-e-mé → *klema/e	qemë
2nd pl.	*esi (2nd sg.) + -ni	jeni	*h₁s-té → *eśtā	*eśetā	jeshëtë	ishit	*kʷl-e-té → *kletā	qetë
3rd pl.	*h₁s-nti	janë	*h₁s-énd → *eśend	*eśend	ishinë	ishin	*kʷl-e-nd → *klend	qenë
