= Paresi language =

Arawakan language spoken in Brazil

Paresi
- Arití
- Haliti-Paresi, Paresi-Haliti
- Native to: Brazil
- Region: Mato Grosso
- Ethnicity: 2,138 Paresí (2014)
- Native speakers: 1,800 (2014)
- Language family: Arawakan: Southern ?; Paresí–Xingu; Paresí languages; Paresi

Language codes
- ISO 639-3: pab
- Glottolog: pare1272
- ELP: Paresí
- Pareci is classified as Definitely Endangered by the UNESCO Atlas of the World's Languages in Danger

Paresi (also called Haliti-Paresi or Paresi-Haliti by the speakers themselves) is an Arawakan language spoken in Brazil. There are approximately 2000 Paresi people, and around 1800 (~90% of the population) speak the language. The Paresi live in the state of Mato Grosso, more specifically in nine indigenous territories: Rio Formoso, Utiariti, Estação Parecis, Estivadinho, Pareci, Juininha, Figueira, Ponte de Pedra, and Uirapuru. In terms of endangerment, it is not in immediate danger. It is used in many everyday domains, but there is a lack of transmission to younger generations, as well as an evident language shift to Portuguese. This is a result of Portuguese being used in education and healthcare, as well as the integration of Brazilian culture among the Paresi people, creating changes in their language and cultural practices.

== History ==
Paresi speaking people were deeply affected by contact with Portuguese colonizers, whom they first encountered in 1718. For over 100 years, they were enslaved as miners in Mato Grosso. As Paresi speakers lived in rubber-dense areas, many were driven from their homes or taken as guides by prospective tappers in the late 19th century; this exploitation and aggression would drive them almost to extinction in the 20th century. Several Catholic missionaries of the Anchieta congregation forced Paresi children into boarding schools, where attempts were made to suppress their language, and also assumed control of the entire Utiariti area from the local Waimaré people.

All of this disruption led to several subgroups of Paresis being lost either due to extinction or assimilation into other groups, as well as a shift in most groups towards speaking Brazilian Portuguese rather than Paresi. Some groups however are still making efforts to maintain Paresi traditional cultural practices as well as the language, such as the Kozarene who make traditional beer, and bread, and wear Paresi headdresses, and skirts.

== Classification ==
Paresi belongs to the Arawak language family, one of the largest and most widespread language families in South America. Payne (1991) used lexical retention to determine language classification, and placed Paresi in the Central branch. Aikhenvald (1999) and Ramirez (2001) group Paresi into the Paresi-Xingu branch.

== Documentation ==
There has been some documentation for Paresi. A sketch grammar served as a preliminary description of discourse, clause, and word structure. A preliminary dictionary has been compiled based on the variety spoken in the Utiariti area. Phonology work has also been done, more specifically with the phonetics and phonology of the Waimaré dialect, and a phonological description of major Paresi variants using feature geometry. Brandão has written a verbal morphology description dealing with verb classes, tense, aspect, and modality. A morphosyntax description addressing functional morphemes with respect to negation, aspect, and mood has also been written. There are other pedagogical materials available in addition to student theses written by undergraduate Paresi speakers from the State University of Mato Grosso.

The Museu do Índio has an ongoing language project for Paresi, coordinated by Glauber Romling. The goal of the project is to involve the indigenous community by offering basic archival and linguistic training to analyze speech data in the form of mythical tales and sociolinguistic interviews.

== Phonology ==
=== Consonants ===
There are 17 contrastive consonant phonemes in Paresi, with three marginal phonemes that only appear in very restricted contexts. These marginal phonemes are analyzed to be their own phonemes, because unlike other palatalized consonant allophones in the language, these phonemes can appear word-initially before /a/, which would not trigger palatalization.

Adapted from Brandão (2014)
	Labial	Dental	Alveolar	Palato-Alveolar	Velar	Glottal
Nasal	m ⟨m⟩		n ⟨n⟩			
Plosive	b ⟨b⟩		t ⟨t⟩	tʲ ⟨ty⟩	k ⟨k⟩	
Affricate			t͡s ⟨ts⟩	(t͡ʃ) ⟨tx⟩		
Fricative	f ⟨f⟩	θ ⟨z⟩		(ʃ) ⟨x⟩		h ⟨h⟩
Flap			ɾ ⟨r⟩			
Lateral			l ⟨l⟩	(lʲ) ⟨ly⟩		
Approximant	w ⟨w⟩			j ⟨y⟩		

=== Vowels ===
There are 6 contrastive vowel phonemes in Paresi, although the nasalized vowels are restricted in the contexts in which they may occur and are occasionally emphatic allophones of their oral equivalents, the front nasal vowels are the only ones with distributions complementary to their respective oral vowels. Paresi exhibits a form of rhinoglottophilia in that vowels adjacent to a glottal fricative onset to a final syllable are nasalized and exhibit breathy phonation.

	Front	Back
High	i ⟨i⟩, ĩː ⟨ĩ⟩	
Mid	e ⟨e⟩, ẽː ⟨ẽ⟩	o ⟨o⟩
Low	a ⟨a⟩	

== Morphology ==
Paresi is a polysynthetic language, whose morpheme boundaries are clear-cut and easy to parse. Affixes are very productive in the language, with prefixes being attached mainly to verbs, and to some nouns to form stative predicates. Different sets of suffixes exist for nouns and verbs; nominal suffixes encode possession and plurals, and verbal suffixes encode aspect, valency changes, and number. Personal and clausal clitics are quite numerous, with personal clitics marking possession and the subject, and clausal enclitics signalling future, past, or irrealis. Adnominal (appearing before nouns) and adverbial demonstratives are also extensive, with a 4-way split in adnominal demonstratives: proximal, medial, distal, and non-visual, as well as a distinction in number.

=== Personal Pronouns ===
	Singular	Plural
1st person	natyo	witso
2nd person	hitso	xitso
3rd person	hatyo, eze	hatyonae, ezenae

The third person pronouns are identical to the proximal and medial demonstratives, eze and hatyo. Little syntactic distinction exists between the two save for the fact that hatyo may be cliticized to /ha-/ to reflect a third person singular reflexive, otherwise the third person personal pronouns are identical to demonstratives.

hatyo-nae kakoa ali witso hoka wi-tyaona-ita
3SG-PL COM here 1PL CON 1PL-live-IFV
'We came with them to live here.'

=== Pronominal Clitics ===
		Set A		Set B	
		Singular	Plural	Singular	Plural
1st person		na-	za-	no-	wi-
2nd person		ha-	wa-	hi-	xi-
3rd person	V	∅-	-ha	∅-	
3rd person	N	∅-	-ha/-nae	e-	

Pronominal clitics reflect subject agreement on verbs, with Set A marking subject agreement on agentive verbs, and Set B marking subject agreement on non-agentive verbs and possession on nouns. The suffix /-nae/ is a generic plural that is used with the third person plural, with /-ha/ being specific. Because these clitics are mandatory, Paresi is a strongly pro-drop language and subject pronouns are optional.

(natyo) no-ka-nakaira-ene
(1SG) 1SG-ATTR-food-3OBJ
'I ate it.'

=== Valency Change ===
Paresi has three forms of valency decreasing for verbs morphologically:

1. the inactive inchoative /-oa/
2. the reflexive /-wi/
3. the reciprocal /-kakoa/

The suffix /-oa/ is used to express the middle voice for some transitives, the reflexive for various verbs of changing the position of one’s body or taking care of one’s self, and the passive for several verbs of harm or detriment.

hati-kanatse ma-txihola-ty-oa
house-mouth NEG-door-TH-MM
‘The door of the house opened’

katxolo etolits-oa
dog lie.down-MM
‘The dog lays down (the dog lays itself down)’

hala-halo-ty-oa-heta
paint-FEM-TH-MM-PERF
‘She painted herself’

tyalok-oa
bite-MM
‘Get bitten’

The suffix /-wi/ is a much more straightforward reflexive, and is exclusively used with verbs that would normally have two very distinct arguments, unlike those made reflexive by /-oa/. The reciprocal /-kakoa/ may be used with doubled plural morphology to indicated multiple reciprocal pairs, and may also attach to a noun in addition to a verb to indicate the reciprocal participants making it a “discontinuous reciprocal”.

Valency is increased by attaching either the causative prefix /a-/, or the causative suffix /-ki/, or both. Causatives may also be formed periphrastically with the verb /moka/.

=== Verbal Modality ===
Paresi modality and expression of verbal reality is intertwined with the evidentiality of said verbs. Paresi has three counterfactual modalities:

1. frustrative (an action that was unfortunately not achieved, or did not go as expected)
2. dubitative (an action may or may not be true)
3. desiderative (the action is desired by the speaker)

Of those three, the first two distinguish evidentiality and certainty.

The frustrative marker /zaore~zakore/ is used to indicate that an action did not or could not be achieved or finished, and comes before the clause that expresses said action, or acts as a particle and indicates an undesirable outcome.

kazatya wi-tsere-hena zakore a-heka-e-tsa witso
jacuba 1PL-drink-TRS FRUST CAUS-be.drunk-CAUS-TH 1PL
‘We were drinking jacuba, and unfortunately we got drunk.’

The other frustrative marker /motya/ indicates that the verb contradicts one’s assumptions or expectations drawn from visual evidence. If one were to see that the sky was cloudy, and from that expected it to rain, but then it did not, they would utter the following:

motya atyo ite one-hena wi-hiye
FRUST TOP FUT water-TRS 1PL-BEN
‘Apparently it was going to rain (but it did not).’

The two dubitative markers, /zamani/ and /kala/ are different in levels of certainty, the formers marks something that the speaker is quite uncertain of, while the latter indicates a non-absolute, but high degree of certainty, the speaker may have even witnessed the event personally.

Sandro zamani Valeria kokoa ka-itsani aoka-ha
Sandro DUB Valeria COM ATTR-child say-PL
‘They say Valeria is pregnant by Sandro (but I doubt it).’

Kala Enoharetse tyaona-ita eye ha-wawa-hare-nae
DUB Enoharetse live-IFV this 3S-be.alone-MASC-PL
‘Enoharetse was already living alone here (I think).’

Finally, there is the desiderative marker /katsani/ indicating a first person wish.

== Syntax ==
Paresi is a nominative-accusative language, in that subjects of transitive and intransitive verbs are marked identically, and the object of a transitive differently. Paresi does not overtly mark case, but indicates subjects and objects primarily through word order: sentences where the object is not a pronoun are usually ordered Subject-Object-Verb,

Paula iyakaniti hotikitsa
Paula pictures show
‘Paula showed pictures.’

and sentences with a pronominal object are typically ordered Subject-Verb-Object.

Baba aotyaitsa natyo hoka
father teach me then
‘Then my father taught me.’

Since the person and number of subjects are always marked with verb prefixes, subjects that have already been introduced are mostly omitted. If the object is established and third person, then it is also usually dropped in favour of the object suffix -ene, so sentences are frequently OV, SV, or simply V.

No-kanakair-ene
1SG-eat-3OBJ
‘I ate it.’

However, as Paresi is a very topic-focused language, the most relevant information, be that object or subject, tends to be put first in a sentence, making OSV a very common word order in Paresi, leading to some ambiguity if the arguments are not of different persons or numbers.

Katxolohokotsetxoa_{O} ala ani_{S} xakatetya_{V}
small.dog FOC wasp sting
‘The wasp was stinging the dog.’

These cases can be disambiguated with the topic marker atyo, which marks a new conversational subject, or the focus marker ala, which usually marks an object that has been moved to first position. These, however, are optional, so in subject and object must occasionally be discerned by context.

Wi-halanatse_{O} menetse_{S} toka-olatya_{V}
our-dog anaconda hold-tie
‘An anaconda held and tied our dog.’

Paresi sentences also very occasionally have OVS word order:

Kala koloho_{O} miyatya_{V} mahalitihare_{S} hoka
DUB forest destroy non-native then
‘Then the non-native destroyed the forest.’

== Semantics ==
=== Numerals ===
The first four numbers in Paresi are lexical items (listed below), and anything above 4 is counted using base-5, using body parts (ie: fingers, toes, hands, feet).

Numeral	Paresi
1	hatita
2	hinama
3	hanama
4	zalakakoa

hinama-li ala konare Ø-noloka
two-CLF:round FOC cará.fish 3SG-pull
‘She caught two cará fishes.’

kahi-ti halakoa kahe haiya, kahi-ti tyotya
hand-UNPOSS one.side hand IND2 hand-UNPOSS everything/all
‘Sometimes five days (one hand), or ten days (all the hands).’

=== Quantifiers ===
Paresi has the following quantifiers:

1. tyotya 'all'
2. kahare 'many, a lot'
3. inira 'few'
4. taita 'only’

The first three can appear independently as pronouns, and all four modify nouns. Tyotya, kahare, and inira can appear both before and after nouns, whereas inira can only appear before nouns. Unlike demonstratives, these quantifiers can also take personal clitics and aspect markers, which are normally only found on verbs.

kozaka-ene ali-yere-nae tyotya Ø-zane
already-PST here-NMLZ-PL everything/all 3SG-go
‘The people from here, all of them were already gone.’

kozaka-ene ali-yere-nae tyotya Ø-zane
already-PST here-NMLZ-PL everything/all 3SG-go
‘The people from here, all of them were already gone.’

tyotya haliti Ø-tyaon-ita-ene
all Paresi.Indian 3SG-live-IFV-PST
'All the Paresi people lived there.'

Kahare ‘many, a lot’ can take both countable nouns and uncountable nouns. Examples (24) and (25) show kahare taking clitics and aspect markers respectively.

hatyohiyeta kahare zoima Ø-tyaona-te hitiya
then many child 3SG-be.born-FUT again
‘Then, many children were born.’

oliti kahare Ø-aitsa-ha-ita-ha
game many 3SG-kill-PL-IFV-PL
‘They killed a lot of game.’

wi-kahare
1PL-a.lot
'There were a lot of us.'

kahare-hena haiya haliti ena ohiro zoaha Ø-waiyore-ta
a.lot-TRS IND2 person man woman and 3SG-know-IFV
'Many Paresi people, men, and women, know.'

Inira appears before nouns and can also take the plural –nae, shown in Example (26).

waiye-hare Ø-bete-hena hoka Ø-iya-h-ita-ha inira-nae atyo
good-MASC 3SG-sell-TRS CON 3SG-buy-PL-IFV-PL few-PL TOP
'They sold beautiful things, but they bought few things.'

no-zakaihaka-tya inira
1SG-tell.story-TH few
'I will tell a little bit of the story.'

Taita can come before or after the noun, but does not appear as its own independent pronoun. In (29), taita is being used as a non-verbal predicate.

imoti taita ali tyaona
non-Indian only here COP
'Here there were only non-Indian people.'

hatyo taita
that only
'That is it.'
