= Permissive mood =

Grammatical mood expressing permission

The permissive mood is a grammatical mood that indicates that the action is permitted by the speaker.

== In Lithuanian ==
It is one of the optative mood forms that survived (archaic) in Lithuanian. It exists only in the 3rd person. For example, a permissive mood of verb tekti (to run, to flow; about liquids; teka, "[it] runs") is tetekiė́ (let [it] run). This form has also meaning of third-person dual and plural. One of the signs of the permissive mood is the prefix te- (of unknown origin); it is added (for primary verbs, which have bisyllabic stem in present tense and stressed ending in first-person present tense) to the form of third-person singular ancient optative mood or to the form of third-person singular indicative mood for the secondary verbs and for those primary verbs, which has unstressed ending in the first-person singular form (for example, the permissive mood of bė́gti (to run; 'bė́ga', [he] runs) is tebė́ga, "let [him] run"). More examples: wikt:lt:tedirbie, wikt:lt:teaugie.

== See also ==
- Hortative
