= List of glossing abbreviations =

List of interlinear glossing abbreviations

This article lists common abbreviations for grammatical terms that are used in linguistic interlinear glossing of oral languages (Note: The transcription and glossing of sign languages is in its infancy. Glossing is typically a sign-by-sign translation with almost no grammatical parsing. Some of the few standardized conventions are: A— (sign A held in its final position) A#B (A and B signed simultaneously) A^B (host-clitic combination) ____t (non-manual marking for topic) ____y/n (non-manual marking for polar question) ix or index (3rd-person referents / pointing signs)) in English.

The list provides conventional glosses as established by standard inventories of glossing abbreviations such as the Leipzig Glossing rules, the most widely known standard. Synonymous glosses are listed as alternatives for reference purposes. In a few cases, long and short standard forms are listed, intended for texts where that gloss is rare or uncommon.

== Conventions ==
- Grammatical abbreviations are generally in full or small caps to visually distinguish them from the translations of lexical words.
  - For instance, capital or small-cap past (frequently abbreviated to pst) glosses a grammatical past-tense morpheme, while lower-case 'past' would be a literal translation of a word with that meaning. Similarly, (small) cap -down might be a locative suffix used in nominal inflections, prototypically indicating direction downward but possibly also used where it is not translatable as 'down' in English, whereas lower-case 'down' would be a direct English translation of a word meaning 'down'. Not all authors follow this convention.
- Person-number-gender is often further abbreviated, in which case the elements are in lowercase rather than in small caps.
  - e.g. 3ms(g), 2fp(l), 1di and 1pe rather than 3sg.m, 2pl.f, 1du.incl and 1pl.excl. (Note: 3sg.n should be fully abbreviated to 3ns, rather than to *3nsg, to avoid confusion with 3nsg (3 non-singular).)
- Glosses may be abbreviated more severely than is the norm (e.g. ip rather than imm.pst for 'immediate past'), if the grammatical terms are particularly frequent within a text.
  - This helps keep the gloss graphically aligned with the parsed text when the abbreviations are longer than the morphemes they gloss. Such shortened forms may be ambiguous with other authors or texts and so are not presented as normative here.
- Glosses may also be less abbreviated than the norm (e.g. transtvzr for 'transitivizer' or subjunct for 'subjunctive') if they are not common in a particular text, so as to not tax the reader.
  - At the extreme, glosses may not be abbreviated at all but simply written in small caps, e.g. complementizer, nontheme or downriver rather than comp, nth or dr. Such spellings^{e.g. in} have been omitted from the list below, but are always possible.
- A morpheme will sometimes be used as its own gloss, either when it is the topic of discussion and the author wishes it to be immediately recognized in the gloss among other morphemes with similar meanings, or when it has multiple or subtle meanings that would be impractical to gloss with a single conventional abbreviation.
  - For example, if a passage has two contrasting nominalizing suffixes under discussion, ɣiŋ and jolqəl, they may be glossed gn and jq, with the glosses explained in the text. This is also seen when the meaning of a morpheme is debated, and glossing it one way or another would prejudice the discussion.
- Lexical morphemes are typically translated, using lower-case letters, though they may be given a grammatical gloss in small caps if they play a grammatical role in the text. Exceptions include proper nouns, which typically are not translated, and kinship terms, which may be too complex to translate. Proper nouns/names may simply be repeated in the gloss, or may be replaced with a placeholder such as "(name.f)" or "pn(f)" (for a female name). For kinship glosses, see the dedicated section below for a list of standard abbreviations.
  - For example, a gloss of the French 'le garçon mange la pomme' (the boy eats the apple) would include the words 'boy' and 'apple' rather than 'garçon' and 'pomme'.
- Lehmann recommends that abbreviations for syntactic roles not be used as glosses for arguments, as they are not morphological categories. Glosses for case should be used instead, e.g. erg or nom for A. Morphosyntactic abbreviations are typically typeset as full capitals even when small caps are used for glosses.
  - These morphosyntactic abbreviations include A (agent of transitive verb), B (core benefactive), D or I (core dative / indirect object), E (experiencer of sensory verb), G or R (goal or recipient – indirect object of ditransitive verb), L (location argument), O or P (patient of transitive verb), S (single argument of intransitive verb), S_{A} (Sa) and S_{P} (Sp) or S_{O} (So) (agent- and patient-like argument in split-S alignment), Se and Sx (argument of equative/copular and existential verb), Su (subject of v.t. or v.i.), and T (theme – direct object of ditransitive verb).
    - Such abbreviations are, however, commonly used as the basis for glosses for symmetrical voice systems (formerly called 'trigger' agreement, and by some still 'focus' (misleadingly, as it is not grammatical focus), such as av (agent voice), bf (beneficiary 'focus'), lt (locative 'trigger').
- Glosses for generic concepts like 'particle', 'infix', 'tense', 'object marker' and the like are generally to be avoided in favor of specifying the precise value of the morpheme. However, they may be appropriate for historical linguistics or language comparison, where the value differs between languages or a meaning cannot be reconstructed, or where such usage is unambiguous because there is only a single morpheme (e.g. article or aspect marker) that can be glossed that way. When a more precise gloss would be misleading (for example, an aspectual marker that has multiple uses, or which is not sufficiently understood to gloss properly), but glossing it as its syntactic category would be ambiguous, the author may disambiguate with digits (e.g. asp1 and asp2 for a pair of aspect markers). Such pseudo-glossing may be difficult for the reader to follow.
- Authors also use placeholders for generic elements in schematicized parsing, such as may be used to illustrate morpheme or word order in a language.
  - Examples include head or hd 'head'; root or rt 'root'; stem or st 'stem'; pref, prfx or px 'prefix'; suff, sufx or sx 'suffix'; clit, cl or encl 'clitic' or 'enclitic'; prep 'preposition' and pos or post 'postposition', png 'person–number–gender element' and tam 'tense–aspect–mood element' (also ng number–gender, pn person–number, ta tense–aspect, tame tense–aspect–mood–evidential) etc. These are not listed below as they are not glosses for morphological values.

== Lists ==
Nonabbreviated English words used as glosses are not included in the list below. Caution is needed with short glosses like at, by, to and up, which could potentially be either abbreviations or (as in these cases) nonabbreviated English prepositions used as glosses.

Transparent compounds of the glosses below, such as rempst or rem.pst 'remote past', a compound of rem 'remote' and pst 'past', are not listed separately.

Abbreviations beginning with n- (generalized glossing prefix for non-, in-, un-) are not listed separately unless they have alternative forms that are included. For example, npst non-past is not listed, as it is composable from n- non- + pst past. This convention is grounded in the Leipzig Glossing Rules. Some authors use a lower-case n, for example nh for 'non-human'.

Some sources are moving from classical lative (lat, -l) terminology to 'directional' (dir), with concommitant changes in the abbreviations. Other authors contrast -lative and -directive.

Some sources use alternative abbreviations to distinguish e.g. nominalizer from nominalization, or shorter abbreviations for compounded glosses in synthetic morphemes than for independent glosses in agglutinative morphemes. These are seldom distinct morphosyntactic categories in a language, though some may be distinguished in historical linguistics. They are not distinguished below, as any such usage tends to be idiosyncratic to the author.

=== Punctuation and numbers ===
Conventional Gloss	Variants	Meaning	Reference
-		separator for segmentable morphemes, e.g., Lezgian amuq’-da-č (stay-fut-neg) "will not stay"	
=	꞊, ‿	[optional in place of hyphen] separator for clitics, e.g., West Greenlandic palasi=lu niuirtur=lu (priest=and shopkeeper=and) "both the priest and the shopkeeper"	
.		when a morph is rendered by more than one gloss, the glosses are separated by periods, e.g., French aux chevaux (to.art.pl horse.pl) "to the horses" A period is not used between person and number, e.g. 1pl, 2sg, 1du, 3nsg (nonsingular).	
_		[optional in place of period] when the language of the gloss lacks a one-word translation, a phrase may be joined by underscores, e.g., Turkish çık-mak (come_out-inf) "to come out" With some authors, the reverse is also true, for a two-word phrase glossed with a single word.	
›	>, →, :	[optional in place of period] direction of polypersonal agreement in a single gloss, whether (a) possession (1s›sg means 1s possessor and singular possessum) or (b) transitivity (2›3 means 2 acts on 3, as in guny-bi-yarluga (2du›3sg-fut-poke) "(who) do you two want to spear?" A colon is used by some authors: 1s:sg, 2du:3sg-fut-poke.	
:		[optional in place of period] separates glosses where segmentation is irrelevant (morphemes may be segmentable, but author does not wish to separate them)	
;	:	[optional in place of period] separates glosses that are combined in a portmanteau morpheme, as in aux chevaux (to;art;pl horse;pl) "to the horses". Some authors use the colon indiscriminately for this convention and the previous.	
+		[optional] compound word or fused morpheme. (Also used in 1+2 (inclusive) vs 1+3 (exclusive) person; emph+ strong emphatic)	
&		[optional in place of period] cross-referencing: X&Y = X›Y or Y›X or both	
/	|	alternative meanings of ambiguous morpheme, e.g. 2/3 for a morpheme that may be either 2nd or 3rd person, or dat/gen for a suffix used for both dative and genitive.	
\		[optional in place of period] a morpheme indicated by or affected by mutation, as in Väter-n (father\pl-dat.pl) "to (our) fathers" (singular form Vater)	
[...]		[optional in place of period] indicates unmarked element (such as fils (son[msg], which has no suffix for msg). The null suffix -∅ may be used instead.	
(...)		[optional in place of period] inherent category, such as covert gender (when glossed at all)	
~		[required in place of hyphen] marks reduplication and retriplication (e.g. Ancient Greek γέγρᾰφᾰ (gé~graph-a) prf~write-1sg 'I have written', with word-initial reduplication)	
⟨...⟩	<...>	[required in place of hyphen] marks off an infix (e.g. ⟨iter⟩Vb is word-initial infixation that makes the verb iterative)	
⟩...⟨	-...-, >...<	[optional in place of hyphens] marks off a circumfix or bipartite stem. The second element may be glossed the same as the first, or as circ, stem or $: ge⟩lauf⟨en ⟨part.prf⟩run ge⟩lauf⟨en part.prf⟩run⟨part.prf ge⟩lauf⟨en part.prf⟩run⟨circ ge-lauf-en part.prf-run-part.prf ge-lauf-en part.prf-run-circ	
$		(second part of a discontinuous lexeme)	
√		[optional] used by some authors to mark which element is the root (in ⟨x-√y-z⟩, 'y' is the root)	
?	??, x	(morpheme not understood, unidentified morpheme)	
∅	0, Ø	zero (null) morpheme (such as fils-∅ (son-msg), with a 'zero' suffix for msg). Brackets may be used instead.	
	0	zeroth person ('one', as in Finnish, Keres)	
	0	epenthetic segment (semantically null)	
1		first person (1msg, 1fpl, 1excl, dem1 etc.): 1hon speaker-honorific, 1hml speaker-humiliative/humble	
2		second person	
3		third person (3sg.m or 3msg or 3ms; 3pl.f or 3fpl or 3fp; 3du.n or 3ndu or 3nd; n3 or n3 non-3rd person) [occasionally 3sm, 3sn, 3sf, 3pm, 3pn, 3pf etc.]	
	12, 13	inclusive, exclusive person (especially if not thought of as a form of 1pl) (rarely other digit compounds, e.g. 12 dual vs 122 plural inclusive, 33 vs 333 for 3du vs 3pl, etc.)	
	3sp	impersonal 'space' subject	
	3.3′.cj	(3rd-person subj, 3rd-person obj conjunct–order verb)	
	4	fourth person (= obv)	
	4	first person inclusive	
	4	indefinite person	
i, ii, iii, iv etc.		noun classes / genders	
> ≥ < ≤		older and younger: 1sg> 'I' (speaker older than addressee), 2sg≤ 'you' (speaker addressing addressee of same age or younger), 3sg> 's/he' (referent older than (a) speaker or (b) addressee, depending on requirements of discourse)	
= ≠		same and different generations: 3du≠ 'they two' (of different generations, e.g. grandchild and great-grandchild), 1pl= 'we' (of same generation, e.g. me and my siblings)	
≈		varies with	

=== Grammatical abbreviations ===
Conventional Gloss	Variants	Meaning	Reference
	-a	athematic (tama athematic tense-aspect-mood, anta athematic antecedent, etc.)	
	a-	associating (prefix on case abbreviation)	
	aa	addressee authority (cf. sa)	
	ab	from. May be equivalent to abess or abl. Compounded for abe(ss), abl(at), abel etc. if a single morpheme, as ab-ess, ab-lat or ab-dir, ab-ela etc. if not.	
	ab, abv	above deictic center	
abess	abe, ab	abessive case (a.k.a. caritive case or privative case: 'without') Lehmann (2004) recommends using privative (prv) or aversive (avers) instead	
abil	abl, cap	ability or capability (acq.abil acquired ability, intr.abil intrinsic ability)	
abl	abla	ablative case ('from')	
	abm	ablative-modalis case	
abs	absol, ab	absolutive case	
	absl	absolute (free, non-incorporated form of noun)	
abst	ab cn	abstractive; abstract	
abstr		abstract (of nominal)	
absv	absn	absentive (occurring in a place displaced from the deictic centre)	
	abt	about	
	ac	motion across (as opposed to up/down-hill, -river)	
	ac	animacy classifier	
acc	ac	accusative case	
	accom	accompanier	
ach		achievement	
	acp, accmp	accomplishment	
	acr, act cn?	actor role	
act	ac	active voice	
	act	action (verbal participle)	
	act	actual	
	actl	actualizing	
	acty	activity	
ad		near, by. May be equivalent to adess or all. Compounded for ade(ss), (irregular all), adel etc. if a single morpheme, as ad-ess, ad-lat, ad-ela etc. if not.	
	ad	agent demotion	
	ad	anti-deictic	
	adap	adaptive	
add	addit	additive case; additive focus	
adess	ad, ade, ades	adessive case ('at'; more specific than loc). See ad.	
adel		adelative	
adj		adjective (adjz adjectivizer)	
	adj	adjunct	
adjz	adjr	adjectivizer	
adm	admon	admonitive mood (warning)	
adr	addr, ad	addressive; addressee-anchored/orientated/perspective	
adv		adverb(ial) (advz ~ advr adverbializer); adverbial case	
	adv	advancement	
	advm	adverb marker	
advs	adv, advrs, advrst	adversative (maleficiary, 'whereas')	
advz	advr, advzr	adverbializer	
aeq	eq, eql, eqtv	aequalis (equalis) case (like, as), equational particle, equative (adj in nominal clause; eqa, eqs = active, stative equative)	
aff	affmt, affm affirm	affirmative	
	affect	affectionate	
	afm	aforementioned	
afft	aff	affective case	
	afoc	argument-focus marker	
	afw	away from water (= uh)	
	agg	aggregate, collective (cf. col)	
	agn, ag.n, agnr	agent nominalization/noun	
	agr, ag	agreement affix (typically number–gender; cf. png); Lehmann (2004) recommends avoiding and specifying agreement categories.	
agt	ag	agentive case (agnz agentive nominalizer)	
ajc		adjacent	
al	alien cn?	alienable possession	
all	adl, addir	allative case ('to'; also 'aditive' [sic], 'adlative', 'addirective')	
alloc	al	allocutive (addressee honorific)	
	alter	alterphoric, = n.ego	
	ambiph	ambiphoric pronoun	
	amp	amplifier	
an	anm, anim	animate gender (anpl animate plural; cf r; may exclude human referents)	
	an, acnr, acnnr	action noun, action nominalizer	
	an, adn	adnominalizer	
ana	anp, anaph	anaphoric (demonstrative, suffix)	
	ana	action narrowly averted	
and		andative ('going towards', cf venitive)	
	anp	adnominal verb	
ant		anterior tense (relative tense; used for prf in some traditions)	
	ant	Antecedent (anta athematic antecedent, antt thematic antecedent)	
	ant, antc	anticipated (future), anticipating	
ant	ante	in front of. May be equivalent to antess or antl. Compounded for ante(ss), antl(at), antel etc. if a single morpheme, as ant-ess, ant-lat, ant-ela etc. if not.	
antel		anteelative (antelative)	
antess	ante	antessive case, anteessive ('before')	
antic, ac	acaus	anticausative	
	antic	anticipatory (ant.su anticipatory subject)	
antip, ap	apass, aps, anti, atp	antipassive voice	
antlat	antdir	antelative (ante-lative), antedirective	
	ao	agent-orientated verb	
	aobl	attributive oblique	
aor	ao	aorist (= pst.pfv)	
	ap	adverbial particle [note: better to gloss the actual meaning]	
	apf	adjective prefix	
apl	appl, app, al	applicative (subtypes apl.ins etc.)	
appos	app	apposition, appositional mood	
	approb	approbation	
apr	appr	apprehensive mood, apprehensional ('lest')	
aprt	presp, prpart, prp	active participle, present participle	
aprx	appr	approximative	
apud		near, in the vicinity of. May be equivalent to apudess or apudl. Compounded for apude(ss), apudl(at), apudel etc. if a single morpheme, as apud-ess, apud-lat, apud-ela etc. if not.	
	ar, area	areal (place/time/situation)	
arg		argumentative	
art		article	
	as	aseverative	
	as	actor (agent-role subject)	
asc	assoc, assc, ass	associative case ('with', 'à'; not = com)	
asc	assoc, assc, ass	associative plural (also asc.pl, assoc.pl, ass.p)	
asc	assoc, assc, ass	associative mood	
asc	assoc, assc, ass	compounds, e.g. assoc.mot associated motion	
	asp	aspect, aspectual Lehmann (2004) recommends avoiding 'aspect' as a gloss and specifying the aspect.	
asrt	ass, asst, assert	assertive mood	
	assp	asserted past participle	
assum	assu, ass cn?	assumptive mood, assumed evidential	
	ast	assistive	
	asym	asymmetric (= nsym)	
	at	at (locative) [English preposition as a gloss]	
	atn	attention-calling	
atr	attr, at	attributive (l.atr attributive derived from place name), attributor	
atten	att, attn	attenuative	
aud		auditory evidential, auditive	
aug		augmentative	
aug		augment (in Bantu noun classes)	
aug		augmented number (e.g. of imperative)	
aux		auxiliary verb Per Lehmann (2004), this should only be used if it uniquely identifies the morpheme (i.e., there is only one auxiliary morpheme in the language.)	
av	af, at, a	agent/actor voice/focus/trigger (nav, naf non-actor voice)	
avert		avertive	
avr	avers	aversative, aversive	
	be, tb	'be' verb (a conflation of exist and cop) [cf. cop]	
	bel	below deictic center	
ben	benef	benefactive case ('for')	
bg	bckg	background	
	bi	bivalent	
	bot	bottom (presumably also 'btm')	
	bou, bound	boundary (a. boundary-emphasizing; b. geographic boundary)	
	br	bound root	
	bt	boundary tone	
bv	bf	beneficiary voice/focus/trigger	
c	comm	common gender (c.sg or cs common singular, c.pl or cp common plural)	
	c	current evidence	
	c	conceptualizer	
	-c	'compass', in languages where relative position is based on cardinal direction rather than left, right, front and behind (ablc compass ablative, allc compass allative)	
	c-	complementizing (prefix on case abbreviation)	
	c.exist	ceased existence	
car	carit	caritive case	
card		cardinal numeral (morpheme or grammatical feature)	
	cau, csl	causal-final case; causal	
caus	cau, cs, cstvzr	causative	
	cc	conditional converb	
	cc	clause-chain marker	
	cdm	core development	
	cdn	conjunct dubitive neutral	
	cdp	conjunct dubitive preterite	
	ce	continued event	
cel	celer	celerative	
cent		centric case	
	centrif	centrifugal (motion)	
	centrip	centripetal (motion)	
cert		certainty (evidential)	
cess		cessative	
	cfoc	contrastive focus	
chez		at X's place, at the home of (from the French preposition chez)	
	cho	chômeur	
	chr	cohortative (often = hort)	
	cif	contrary information flow	
circ	cir, circum	circumstantive ('in', 'by')	
circ	cir, circum	circumstantial voice (= cv)	
circ	circum, $	(empty tag to mark second element of a circumfix)	
	circ	circumferential	
	circumess	circumessive	
cis	cisl, cisloc	cislocative	
cit		citation form ending	
cjt	cj	conjoint	
	cl	close link (necessary condition; temporal closeness)	
	cl	nominal class (in Bantu languages)	
	cl	clause-level, e.g. &cl clause-level 'and', compl.cl completive clause marking	
clf	cl, class, clfsr	classifier (base or morpheme) (ncl noun class). Some distinguish clf classifier from cl class marker. The category of classifier should be specified, e.g. "clf:round" or "clf.hum"	
	cm	conjugation marker	
	cm	noun-class marker	
	cm	concatenative marker	
	cmpd	compound	
cmpl	compl, cpl, cmp, comp, cmplt, complet	completive (completitive) aspect (e.g. past.compl completed past) – normally = pfv	
cmpr	cmp, comp, compr, cmpar	comparative	
	cmt, comm	commitment, committal	
	cn	common noun (e.g. cn.det common-noun determiner)	
	cn	conjunct nominal	
	cneg, cng, cn	connegative	
cnj	conj, conjun	conjunction	
	cns, constr, cnstr	construct state/form	
	cns, cnsq, cons	consequential (e.g. consequential mood)	
cntf	cf, ctr, ctrfct, cntr.fact	counterfactual conditional, contrafactuality	
cntr	contr, ctr, cont, con	contrastive, contranstive focus (= contr.foc), contrasted topic	
	cntr	continuer	
	cntr	counter-assertive	
cexp	cntrexp	counterexpectation	
	co.ag	co-agency	
	cocaus	concomitative-causitive	
	coh	coherence	
col	coll	collective number/numeral	
com	cmt, comit	comitative case ('together with', 'in the company of')	
comp	cmp, compl, complr	complementizer (= subr)	
	comp	compassion	
	compv, comp	comparative case (unequal comparison)	
	compul	compulsional	
con	cna, cntv	conative	
	con	concrete	
conc	cncs, concess	concessive ('although') (> concp concessive particle)	
	conc	concurrent	
	conc	concord marker [to be avoided in favor of specifying the agreement]	
cond	cnd, con	conditional mood ('if', 'would') (gcond given conditional, gccond given concessive conditional)	
conf	cfm, confirm	confirmational, confirmative	
	congr, cngr	congruent	
conj	cj	conjunctive (interpropositional relation), conjunct person marking	
conjc	conj	conjectural (evidential) (nconj negative conjectural)	
conn	cn, cnn, ct	connective (particle, mood, case)	
conr	cnct, con	connector	
	cons	consecutive; concessive	
	consec, cons	consecutive mood ('so that')	
	const, cns, cst	constant, constancy	
cont	cnt, ctn, contin	continuous aspect, continuative aspect	
cont		on a vertical surface. (From English contact.) May be equivalent to contess or contl(at). Compounded for conte(ss), contl(at), contel etc. if a single morpheme, as cont-ess, cont-lat or cont-dir, cont-ela etc. if not.	
	cont	continuous direction	
	cont	contentive	
coop		cooperative	
coord		coordination, coordinative	
cop	be	copula, copulative (be identity copula, be.loc locative-existential copula)	
cor	coref, co.ref	coreference, coreferential	
	cp	conjunctive participle	
	cp	complementizer phrase	
	cq	content question (= wh.q)	
cras		crastinal tense ('tomorrow')	
	crd, card	cardinal pronoun	
crs		current relevance marker, currently relevant state (as in the perfect)	
	csm	change of state marker	
	cso	cosubordinator	
	ct	circumstantial topic	
	ctexp	contraexpectative	
ctg	cntg	contingent mood	
	cntg	contiguous	
ctm	ctemp, cotemp, contemp, cont	contemporative (at that/the same time)	
	ctr	control	
cus	cu, cust, custom	customary (cf. usit)	
cv	cf, tf	circumstantial/theme voice/focus/trigger	
	cv	copula verbalizer	
	cv	characteristic vowel	
	cv	conveyance voice (cf. cv circumstantial voice)	
cvb	conv, cnv, c	converb	
dat		dative case	
	dc	dectic center	
	dc	downcoast	
	dd	discourse definite	
de		different event, change of event (cf ds)	
	de	discontinued event	
-de	de	dual exclusive (= du.ex)	
	deag	deagentive	
deb	oblg, oblig, obl	debitive / obligative	
	dec	decausative	
decl	dec, dcl	declarative mood	
ded		deductive evidential	
def	df	definite	
	defin	definitive	
	defoc	defocus	
	defr	deferential (speaker-humble)	
	dei cn?, deic, deix, dx, d	deixis, deictic (d12 deictic of 12 person)	
	del.imp	delayed imperative (a command for later; cf. imm)	
del		delative case ('off of', 'down from')	
	del, dlm	delimiter, delimitative ('just, only'), delimiting	
	del	deliberative mood	
dem	d	demonstrative (dem1 proximate dem, dem2 present/given dem, dem3 remote dem; dem.addr near addressee, dem.down lower than reference point, dem.near ~ dem.nr near, dem.sp near speaker, dem.up higher than reference point)	
	den	denizen	
denom		denominal	
deo	deont	deontic mood	
deobj		deobjective	
dep	d	dependent (as in dep.fut), dependent clause marking (use sjv)	
	depo	deportmentive	
depr		depreciatory, deprecative	
der	deriv	derivation, derivational morpheme (e.g. adj.der adjective-derived)	
	derel	derelational	
des	desi cn?, desid	desiderative mood (= opt) (desn desiderative noun)	
dest		destinative aspect or case ('to') (non-finite verb form = supine)	
det	d	determiner	
detr	dtrnz	detransitivizer, detransitive	
	detr	detrimental	
	dflt	default	
	dh	downhill, seaward (cf dr)	
-di	di	dual inclusive (= du.in)	
	dif	direct information flow	
dim	dimin	diminutive	
dir.ev	direv, dir, dr, drct	direct evidential (= exp; dir/infr direct/inferred)	
dir	direc	directive, directional (= lat); typically suffixed to another element such as ad-, post-, sub-, super-.	
	dir, dr	direct case (> ndir indirect case)	
	dir, dr	direct voice (opposite of inv)	
	dir	directed (dira athematic directed, dirt thematic directed)	
	dis	dislocative	
disc	dm, dsc, d	discourse marker	
	dis.con	discursive connector	
disj	dis, dj	disjunction, disjunctive, disjunct person marking	
	dissat	dissatisfaction	
dist	dis, ds, d, dstl, far	distal, distant (dist.fut, dist.pst, d.prf; dist.impv distal imperative)	
distr	dstr, disb, dist	distributive case	
distr	dstr, disb, dist	distributive plural	
distr	dstr, disb, dist	distributive aspect	
	ditr	ditransitive	
div		diversative	
	dn	deverbal noun	
dnz		denizen	
	dm	demonstrative marker	
	dm	directive marker (polite command)	
DO	do, dobj	direct object(ive)	
	do	do like a ... (verbalizing suffix)	
dom		differential object marking	
dom		direct-object marker	
don		donative (auxiliary of benefactive)	
dox		doxastic	
	dp	distant past. = rem.pst	
	dp	discourse particle [use actual gloss if possible]	
	dp	destinative participle	
	dpast	direct past (evidentiality)	
	dpc	distant past continuative	
	dpp	distant past completive	
dr		downriver (cf dh toward the water)	
	dr	different reference	
ds	da	different-subject/actor/agent (change of subject) marker (cf de)	
dsc	discnt, discont	discontinuative aspect	
	dt	different taxis	
dtr		detrimentary	
du	dl, d	dual number (m.du or md masculine dual, f.du or fd feminine dual)	
dub	dbt, dubit	dubitative mood, dubiative	
	dummy	dummy affix	
	duplic, dv	duplicative	
dur		durative aspect (continuous aspect)	
dv	df	direction voice/focus/trigger	
	dwn, dn down	downward	
dy	dyad cn?	dyadic (e.g. wife-dy 'man and wife')	
dyn	dynm	dynamic aspect / eventive	
	-e	(used to form various essive cases)	
	ea	epistemic authority (= ego)	
	ec	euphonic consonant (= ep)	
	eff	effector	
	efoc	extra-focal	
ego		egophoric (nego non-egophoric)	
egr		egressive	
	ei	euphonic insertion	
ela	el, elat, elv	elative case ('out of')	
	elpa	existential + locative + possessive + attributive	
	em	extension marker	
	em	evaluative marker	
emo	emot	emotive	
emp	emph, em, e	emphatic (e.g. emphatic base of pronouns)	
emp	emph, em, e	emphasizer, emphatic marker (etop emphatic topic)	
	end, fp, fin	clause-final particle (joshi); Per Lehmann (2004), glosses as 'particle' should be avoided; instead translate/gloss the meaning.	
	endo	endopathic (= ego)	
	enc	enunciative particle, as in Gascon	
ep	e, epenth, epent, 0	epenthetic morpheme, epenthetical	
	epi, epis, em, epst, epist	epistemic mood or modality	
epit		epithet	
	equ	equative (= cop)	
erg		ergative case	
	es	echo subject	
ess		essive case ('as')	
ev	evd, evi, evid	evidential (dir.ev etc.) [per Lehmann (2004), the particular evidential should be specified] (prev.evid.ev previous-evidence evidential)	
	ev	euphonic vowel (= ep)	
	ev	experiencer voice	
evit		evitative case (= aversive case)	
	evt	eventual	
exal	def	exaltive/deferential (high-status register)	
	exc, xs	excessive [cf. exess 'ex-essive', which is commonly misspelled 'excessive']	
excl, ex	exc, e	exclusive person (as in 1ex, 1pl.ex, 1e)	
exclam	exclm, excl, exc	exclamative, exclamatory	
	ex.dur	excessive duration	
	exec	executive (auxiliary)	
exess		exessive case	
	exfoc	extrafocal (cleft subordinate clause	
exh	adh	exhortative, adhortative	
	exh.foc	exhaustive focus	
exist	exs, exst, exis, ex, ex.be	existential ('there is')	
exo		exocentric case	
	exp, exper cn?	experiencer, experiencer case	
exp	exper, exp.ev	experiential, eyewitness = direct evidential (cf. wit). exper.past experienced past.	
	expect	expectational	
	expl, exp	expletive (dummy / meaningless form)	
	expr	expressive	
ext		extended (aspect, demonstrative), extendible; extension (sound stretch)	
	ext	extent	
	ext	external evidential	
	extrv	extraversive (trz by addition of ugr)	
	extt	extended topic	
	ezf, ez, izaf	ezafe = izafet	
f	fem	feminine gender (f.sg, fsg or fs feminine singular, f.pl, fpl or fp feminine plural) (fem also 'female speaker')	
	fa	future actor	
fac	fact	factive evidential/mood, factual	
fac	fact	factitive (A-fact NP 'make NP A')	
fam		familiar, as for familiar register (as the T–V distinction) and familiar pronominal	
	fc	future conjunct (nfc non-future conjunct)	
	fcl	facilitive	
	fd	future disjunct	
	fh, firsth	firsthand (nfh non-firsthand)	
	fi	feminine indefinite	
	fill, sfl	morphological filler, sentence filler (expletive)	
fin		finite verb (nfin non-finite)	
	fin	finalis	
fmr	dcsc	former, deceased, 'late'	
	fn	first (= given) name	
	fnl	phrase-final suffix	
foc		focus (confusingly used both for symmetrical voice and for true grammatical focus: a.foc, agfoc agent/actor focus; p.foc, pfoc patient focus; lfoc location focus, bfoc beneficiary focus, acfoc accompanier focus, ifoc instrument focus, cfoc conveyance focus)	
for	frm, form, frml	formal register (as the T–V distinction)	
for	frm, form, frml	formal mood	
for	frm, form, frml	formal case ('in the capacity of...')	
fprt	fp	future participle	
	fpst, fp	far past	
fract		fraction, fractional (numeral)	
freq	frq, fr cn?	frequentative aspect	
	frt	front	
frus	frust, frst, fr, frustr	frustrative	
fs		false start	
ftv	fact	factative tense (pres if stative, past if not)	
	func	functional	
	func	functive case	
fut	f, ft	future tense (fobj future objective)	
	fut.int, itf	future intention, intentional future	
	fv, tv	final/terminal vowel	
g1, g2, g3, g4 etc.	gnd etc.	gender / noun class (e.g. G4 = 4th gender; may be used alongside m, f etc.)	
	gem	generalized evaluative marker	
gen	gn, g	genitive case, genitive form of pronoun	
	genz	generalized	
ger	grd	gerund, gerundive (for the latter, use obligative)	
giv		given	
	gkn	general knowledge (evidential)	
	gm	gender marker [or specify the gender]	
	gnf	general non-finite	
gno	gnomic	gnomic (generic) aspect	
gnr	genr, gnrl, gener, genrl, gen	generic, general (e.g. classifier, tense; appl.gen general applicative)	
	gnt	general tense	
	go&, am, dk	associated motion. go&do (go to a place and perform the verb) (= asc.mot)	
	gpst	general past	
	grp	group numeral	
	gtop	given topic	
gv	gf, gt	goal voice/focus/trigger [how d this diff from PV?]	
	h	head	
	h	hearer/reader	
	h	high variety/code, in adiglossic situation	
h	hum	human, anthropic gender (h.sg or hs human singular, h.pl or hp human plural, allh human allative) (cf. r)	
	h	higher animacy, higher object (cf. la)	
hab	habit	habitual aspect	
	hbl	habilitive	
hcr		hypocoristic	
hes	hesit	hesitation, hesitation particle	
hest		hesternal tense ('yesterday')	
hist		historic(al), as in historical present or past historic tense	
	hndr	number of hundreds (in a numeral)	
hod	tod	hodiernal tense ('today' in hod.fut/hodfut hodernial future, hod.pst/todp hodernial past)	
hon	hnr, h, hs ^{[suffix]}	honorific (subject honorific)	
	hor	horizon of interest	
	hor	horizontal	
hort	hor [cn]	hortative (1st-person imperative)	
	hpl	human plural (h.pl)	
	hr.ev	heard evidential (= aud)	
hrs	hsy, hs, hrsy, eh	hearsay/reported evidential	
hum	hml, hbl cn?	humiliative, humble (low-status register)	
hyp	hypo, hypoth cn?	hypothetical mood	
	i	inflected (aux.i inflected auxiliary)	
	ia	involuntary agent	
	IA	indirect agent(ive)	
	ia	instrumental advancement	
iam		iamitive	
	ic	involuntary causative (natural or accidental events)	
	ic	indirective copula	
	icom	involuntary comitative	
	icvb, ic	imperfective converb	
	ident, id	identity, identical (~ nid),	
	ident	identificational	
	identif	identifiable	
ideo	idph, ideoph	ideophone (≈ mim)	
	ie	informal ending	
	ifut	indefinite future	
ign	ignor	ignorative	
ill	illa, illat	illative case ('into')	
	im	interrogative marker	
	imi	impersonal infinitive	
imm	im, imd, immed	immediate, as in im.imp immediate imperative mood, im.fut near future tense, im.past/impst immediate past; immediate evidential	
	immed	immediate past, = imm.pst	
	imn	imminent (future) = imm.fut	
imp	imper, impv, imprt	imperative mood	
	imparf	imparfait	
impf	imperf, imprf, impft, im	imperfect (= pst.npfv)	
	impl	implicated	
	imposs	modal impossibility	
impr	imprec cn?	imprecative mood	
imprs	impers, impr, imps cn?, impl, imp	impersonal, impersonal verb	
in		in a container. May be equivalent to iness or inl. Compounded for ine(ss), inl(at), inel etc. if a single morpheme, as in-ess, in-lat, in-ela etc. if not.	
	inab, impot	impotential	
	inabl	inablative	
	inact	inactive	
inal		inalienable possession	
inan	inanim	inanimate gender	
	inc	increment	
	incep, inc, incp, ip	inceptive (= inchoative or ingressive)	
inch	incho, inc, inh	inchoative	
incl, in	inc	inclusive person (as 1in or 1pl.in)	
	incp, incip	incipient (incpa athematic incipient, incpt thematic incipient)	
ind	indic	indicative mood	
	indcaus	indirect causative	
	indec	indeclinable	
	indep, indp, ind	independent	
	indet	indeterminate	
indh		indefinite human ('somebody')	
	indir	indirective (motion inward); indirect(?) (indir.cop indirective copula); indirect evidential	
	indiv	individualizer	
indn		indefinite non-human ('something')	
inel		inelative case ('from within')	
iness	ine, ines, insv, in	inessive case ('in')	
inf		infinitive	
infl		inflectional	
infr	infer, infern, inf	inferential mood, inferred evidential	
	ing, ingr	ingressive case	
inj	interj, intrj, intj, int, inter	interjection (incl. 'filler'), interjective	
ins	inst, instr	instrumental case	
	ins	instantiated	
int	inter, interr	interrogative (= q); c.int content interrogative mood	
	int	internal evidential	
inter		within (a solid object). May be equivalent to interess or interl. Compounded for intere(ss), interl(at), interel etc. if a single morpheme, as inter-ess, inter-lat, inter-ela etc. if not.	
	interess	interessive	
	interp	interpellative mood	
intf		interfix	
intl	inten, int	intentional conditional, intentive future	
	intrst	complement of interest	
intrv		introversive	
ints	int, its, intn, intns, inten, intens	intensifier, intensive	
intv	intentv	intentive	
inv		inverse	
	invn	inverse number (as in Kiowa: sg of default pl, pl of default sg)	
	inw	inward	
IO	io, iobj	indirect object(ive)	
	ip	immediate past. = im.pst	
	ipast	indirective past	
	ipd	impeditive	
ips		impersonal passive (passive w/o promotion to subject)	
ips		impersonalizer (agips agent impersonalizer)	
	iq	indirect question, self-addressed question	
	ir	irregular (compounded with other glosses, e.g. loc.ir irregular locative)	
irr	irls cn?, irreal, ir	irrealis mood	
	irrel, irrelev	irrelevence (= nrelev	
	is	indirect speech	
	is	impersonal subject	
	is	immediate scope	
iter	it, ite, itr	iterative aspect	
	itg	intangible	
	itm	intermittent	
itv	itiv, it	itive	
iv	if	instrument voice/focus/trigger	
	ivc	impersonal verb construction	
	j	thematic	
jus	juss	jussive mood	
kin		kinship suffix	
knwn		known	
	-l	(used to form various lative cases)	
	l	low variety/code, in adiglossic situation	
	l	local (exophoric) person (= 1/2)	
L2	b	tags translation as code-switching.	
	la	lower animacy (cf. h)	
lat		lative case (= mvmt, direction)	
	lc	limited control	
	lcl	locational	
	length	vowel or consonant emphasis lengthening	
	lex	lexical-thematic (affix), lexical	
lig		ligature, possessor ligature	
lim	lmt	limitative	
	lkly	likely (modality)	
	ll	land gender	
	ll	lower level (spatial deixis)	
	lm	landmark	
	lm, li	linking morph, linking interfix	
	ln	last (= family) name	
lnk	lk, link	linker, linking element: an interfix or a ligature	
loc	lcv	locative case (includes essive case), locative verb (exist)	
log		logophoric (log.a speaker-logophoric PN, log.b addressee-logophoric PN)	
	loq	delocutive	
	lp	linking particle	
	lq	limiting quantifier	
	ls	lexical stem	
lv	lf	locative/location voice/focus/trigger	
	lv	linking vowel	
	lv	lengthened vowel	
m	masc	masculine gender (m.sg, msg or ms masculine singular, m.pl, mpl or mp masculine plural)	
	m-	modal case (prefix on case abbreviation, e.g. mabl modal ablative)	
	m-	marked (e.g. mnf marked non-future)	
mal		malefactive case	
	male	male speaker	
man	mnr	manner; mood–aspect–negation (e.g. purpose-manner converb)	
	matut	matutinal (in the morning, upon waking)	
	mc	modal clitic	
	mdt, medit	meditative	
	m.e.	multiple event	
	mea	measure	
med		mediative	
med		medial (e.g. medial past, medial demonstrative = giv)	
med		middle voice (= mid)	
	mf	maximal field of view	
mid	md, mp, m, mdl	middle voice, mediopassive	
	mim	mimetic (≈ ideo)	
	min	minimal number	
mir	adm	mirative / admirative	
	mirn	negative mirative	
	mis	miscellaneous gender	
mit		mitigation	
	mloc	modal locative	
	mod, mo	modal case (modalis), e.g. certainty	
mod	mdl, mp^{(modal particle)}	mood, modal, modal particle	
	mod	modifier	
mom		momentane, momentative (single-event verb)	
mono		monofocal person	
	mot	motion (combined with location glosses), mutative	
mov	mvmt	movement	
	ms	maximal scope	
	msap	main speech-act participant (= 1st person in assertions, 2nd in questions)	
msd	masd	maṣdar (verbal noun)	
	mt	mental state (classifier)	
mul	mult, mlt, mltp	multiplicative case, numeral	
	mult	multal	
	mvr	mover	
n	neut, nt	neuter gender (n.sg, nsg or ns neuter singular [cf. nsg non-singular], n.pl, npl or np neuter plural); Sometimes = non-human.	
N		noun (as a gloss in nz nominalizer)	
n-	n-, non-	non-, in-, un-, a- (e.g. nsg, nsg non-singular; npst, npst non-past; nprs, nprs non-present; nfut, nfut non-future; nf, nf non-feminine; nfin, nfin non-finite; nposs, npos non-possessed; n1, n1 non-1st person [i.e. 2/3], n3 non-3rd person; npfv, npfv imperfective)	
	-n	name (fn feminine name, gn geographic name, mn masculine name, pn proper name or place name, pln place name, psn personal name)	
narr	nar cn?	narrative tense	
	nc	noncontrol	
	nc	noun-class marker	
ncompl	icp, inc, incmp, incpl, incmpl, incompl	incompletive/noncompletive aspect (normally = npfv)	
nctm	icm	in contemporative (perfective appositional)	
	ncur	noncurative	
ndef	indf, idf, indef, ind	indefinite	
nec		necessitative	
neg	not, ng	negation, negative (ex.neg existential negation, id.neg identity negation)	
	negat	negatory, negator	
	negf	final negator	
	negn	negative nominalization	
neut	neutr, ntr	neutral aspect	
	nex	non-extended	
	nf	non-final form/marker (cf. non-feminine)	
	nf	non-finite (cf. non-feminine)	
	nfc	non-finite conditional	
nfin	nf cn?	non-finite (nonfinite verb, non-finite clause) (nf may be ambiguous with non-feminine)	
	nfnd	non-future neutral disjunct	
	nfpd	non-future perfective disjunct	
nh	nhum, nh	non-human	
	nm, nmasc	non-masculine	
nmz	nmlz, nlz, nomz, nomzr, nm, nml, nmnl, nom, nomi, nomin, nomn, noml, nzr, nr, nz	nominalizer/nominalization (e.g. pat.nz patient nominalizer)	
nom	nm	nominative case	
	noms	S-only nominative (S case in tripartite system, = ntr)	
	nondum	'not yet'	
	nonin	noninstigational	
	n/p	neuter plural	
	np	noun particle (cf. NP 'noun phrase')	
	np	near past	
	npc	non-past completive	
	npdl	noun-phrase delimiter	
	npers	non-personal animacy	
	npf	noun prefix	
npfv	ipfv, ipf, imp, impfv, imperfv, imprf, impf	imperfective aspect	
	nposs, unposs	non-possessed (marker of unpossessed noun)	
	npp	non-past progressive	
	nr	near (as in nr.dist 'near distal')	
	ns	non-subject (see oblique case)	
	ns	non-singular	
	nsit, newsit	new situation	
	nsp	non–speech-participant perspective (cf. nsp non-specific)	
	ntel, atel, at	atelic	
	ntl	neutral direction	
ntr	intr cn?, intrans, itr	intransitive (covers an intransitive case for the S argument, = noms)	
	nts	non-topical subject	
num	numv	numeral, numerative (num.cl numeral classifier)	
	nv	neutral version (cf. sbv subjective version)	
	nvexp	nonvisual experiential (evidential)	
nvis	invis, nvsen	non-visual (evidential: nvsen non-visual sensory); invisible (deixis)	
	nvir	non-virile (non-masculine personal animacy)	
	nvn	nominal cyclical expansion (cf. vnv)	
nvol	avol, invol	nonvolitional, avolitional, involuntative/involitive	
	nw	non-witnessed	
	nx.pst (= uwpst)	non-experienced past	
	-o	object(ive) (ablo objective ablative, evito objective evitative), 3mo 3m object, 2sg.o 2sg object	
obj	objv, ob	object(ive), object agreement (top.ob topical object); objective case	
obl	o	oblique case, oblique form of pronoun	
	obs	observation	
obv		obviative	
	ofc	object focus. = o.foc or p.foc	
	oinv	inverted object	
	om	object marker	
onom		onomatopoeia	
	op	object prefix	
	opp	opposite	
opt		optative mood (= des)	
	or	orientation (direction) marker	
	or	open reference (not specifically ds or ss)	
ord		ordinal numeral	
	ord	ordinary	
orig		origin, originative	
	os	oblique stem	
	os	onstage region	
	other	non-main speech-act participant (= 2nd or 3rd persion in assertions, 1st or 3rd in questions)	
	out	outward	
	ov	objective version	
	p	pre-, post- (p.hod prehodiernal, p.cras postcrastinal)	
	p	proper (as opposed to common: abs.p absolutitive proper case; gen.p genitive proper case. Cf. pers personal (proper) article.	
	p	previous (evidence)	
	-p	possessor: 1p, 2p, 3fp, 3mp (1st, 2nd, 3rd masc & fem possessor). = 1poss etc.	
	p.ant	past anterior	
	p.imp	plural imperative	
	p/i	passive/imperative (= pas/imp)	
pass	pas, pss, psv	passive voice	
	pabs	past absolutive	
	pat	patientive (= und); Lehmann (2004) recommends avoiding, as it is not the value of a morphological category.	
paus		pausal, pause	
pau	pauc, pa cn?, pc	paucal number (m.pau or mpc masculine paucal, f.pau or fpc feminine paucal; gpauc greater paucal)	
	pc	past completive	
	pc	concord particle	
	pc	perfective converb	
	pcl	'polysemic clause linkage marker'	
	pcp	completive participle	
	pcp	participatory evidence	
	pdr	past, deferred realization	
	pds	previous event, different subject	
	pe	perpetuity	
	pe	previous event	
-pe	pe	plural exclusive (= pl.ex)	
peg		pegative case (a special case for the giver)	
pej		pejorative	
peramb		perambulative	
	peri	peripheral	
perl	per cn?, prl	perlative case	
perm		permission, permissive mood	
	perm	permanent	
pers	p	personal (pers.ev personal evidential / personal experience, pers.ag personal agency, pers.exp personal experience); personal/proper article (= pers.art); 'personal' affix (= 4th person)	
	npers	personal animacy	
	pers, persis	persistive	
	perse	personal experience (= pers.ev)	
	pert	pertensive	
	perv	pervasive	
pfv	pf, perfv	perfective aspect	
	phab	past habitual	
	phas	phasal aspect	
-pi	pi	plural inclusive (= pl.in)	
	pimpf	progressive imperfective	
	pimpv	past imperfective	
	pinf	physical inferential	
	pk	personal knowledge	
pl	p, plur	plural (but 1pl also 1p, 3pl.m also 3mp)	
plup	plu, pprf, pperf, pluperf, pluprf, plpf, plperf, ppf	pluperfect	
plur, vpl	plu, plr, pl, plurac	pluractional (= vpl verbal plural)	
	pm	predicate marker	
	pn, propn, pr cn	proper noun/name, personal name (e.g. pn.det proper-noun determiner)	
PO		primary object	
	po	patient-orientated verb	
	podir	postdirective (= postlative)	
poel	postel	postelative case	
poess	poste, postess	postessive case ('after')	
pol		polite register	
	pos	positive	
poss	pos, po, psr	possessive, possessor (2poss 2nd-person possessive; poss.cl possessive classifier)	
posb	possb, possib	possible, modal possibility	
	possd	possessed	
post	po-	postlocative (behind). May be equivalent to postess or postl. Compounded for poste(ss) (poess), postl(at) (podir), postel (poel) etc. if a single morpheme, as post-ess, post-lat or post-dir, post-ela etc. if not.	
	post, postp	postposition, postpositional case	
	post	post-terminal aspect	
postl	podir, postlat, postdir	postlative case, or 'postdirective'	
pot	poten cn?	potential mood (cf. ver)	
	pp	predicative possessive particle	
	pp	present progressive	
	pp	past perfect	
	pp	pragmatic particle	
	ppa	active perfect participle	
	ppast	post-terminal past	
	ppf	perfect participle	
	ppfv	past perfective (= perfect)	
	ppp	past passive participle	
	ppp	past perfect participle	
pprt	pp, ppt, [cn] ppart, pastp [cn]	passive participle, past participle	
	pps	pseudo-passive	
	pr	pragmatic (in pr.part pragmatic particle)	
	prc	precedence	
prec		precative mood (requests)	
	prec, precon	precondition (preca athematic precondition, prect thematic precondition)	
	prec, pre	precise, precision	
pred		predicative affix, predicative	
	predict	prediction	
prep		preposition, prepositional case	
pret	prt	preterite (= pfv.pst)	
	prev	previous (in evidentials)	
	preven	preventive	
prf	pft, pf, perf	perfect	
	prfrm, perform	performative	
	prior, pr	prior, preceding	
priv	prv, prvt	privative case	
pro	pn, prn, pron	pronominal base, (pro only) proform	
prob	pb	probabilitive	
	procomp	procomplement	
	prod	product verbalizer	
prog	prg, progr	progressive aspect	
proh	prh, prohib	prohibitive mood ('don't!')	
prol	prolat, prl	prolative case (= via)	
	prol	prolonged action	
prop	propr	proprietive case (quality of having X)	
	prop	proper-noun marker	
	propos, prop	propositive mood (inclusive jussive)	
pros	prosec	prosecutive case ('across', 'along')	
prosp	pros, prsp cn?	prospective aspect or mood (ppros past prospective)	
prot		protasis	
	prov	pro-verb	
prox	px, prx	proximal demonstrative; proximate (e.g. prox.imp proximate imperative)	
	prp	property predication	
prs	pres, pr	present tense	
	prsc	prescriptive	
	prsv	presentative	
	ps-	pseudo: psap pseudo-antipassive, pspass pseudo-passive	
	ps	passing state	
	ps	passé simple	
	ps	undergoer (patient-role subject)	
	psa	previous same agent of v.t. (pss previous same subject)	
	pss	previous event, same subject of v.i. (psa previous same agent); pssi and psst previous event, same subject of v.i. and v.t.	
	pssm, pssd	possessum (impersonal), possessed	
	pssr	possessor	
pst	past, pa, ps, p, pas	past tense (e.g. pindef past indefinite, mpst modal past, spst simple past)	
	pstn	past nominalization	
	pst.pr	past/present (different readings on different word classes)	
	pt	potent case inflection	
	ptcl, prt, ptc, pt, ptl, pcl, part	particle (Lehmann (2004) recommends avoiding this and instead translating/glossing the meaning.), particalizer	
ptcp	part, pcp, ppl, ptp, pple, prtc, ptcpl, partic, particip, p	participle, participial (mood)	
	pth	path	
ptv	prtv, par, part, prt, ptt, partve	partitive case	
punc	punct, pnc, pu, pncl, pct, pnct	punctual aspect, punctiliar	
prp	purp, pur	purposive case/converb (nprp non-purposive)	
pv	pf, pt, ov	patient/object voice/focus/trigger	
	pv	pivot form/nominal	
	pv	possessive verbalizer	
pvb	prev, prv, pv	preverb	
	pvp	post-verbal particle (only particle so glossed)	
	px	possessive suffix	
q	qst, ques, quest, QP	question word or particle (= int)	
	qm	quantity marker	
	qu, qm, QM	question marker (usually = q)	
qual		qualifier	
quant	qnt	quantifier	
quot	quo, qt	quotative (quotative case, quotative mood, quotation marker)	
	qv	quotative verb	
	r	rational gender (thinking beings) (r.sg or rs rational singular, r.pl or rp rational plural)	
-r		reflexive (e.g. 3r 3rd-person reflexive)	
	r-	relational (prefix on case abbreviation)	
	r.ext, rt.ext	root extension	
	r/a	realis/assertive	
	ra	repeated action	
	ra	relative agreement	
rar		raritive	
	re	refactive	
	rea	reactive (responding)	
real	rls, rl, r	realis mood	
rec	rct, r	recent, recent past (rec.pst, rec.p recent past tense, r.prf recent perfect)	
	rec	receptive	
recp	rcp, recip, recipr, rec	reciprocal voice	
	red, rdp, redup, rdpl, dup	reduplication, reduplicant (avoid if possible; instead gloss with meaning of reduplicated element)	
ref	rfr	referential, referentive	
refl	rfl, rflx, reflx, ref, rflex, rx, r	reflexive (reflexive pronoun/possessive, reflexive voice; 'r' used with person-number-gender)	
reg		regal (e.g. pronouns)	
	reg	regularity	
regr	reg	regressive	
rel	r	relative clause marker or relativizer	
rel	r	relative pronoun affix	
rel	r	relational (rel.cl relational classifier)	
rel	r	relative case (possessor + A role)	
rel	r	e.g. past.rel relative past	
	rel.fut	relative future	
	relev	relevance	
	relz	relativizer	
rem	rm, rmt	remote: rem.pst or rem.p or remp remote past tense, rem.fut or rem.f or remf remote future tense; also rem remote past tense	
rep	repet, rpt	repetitive aspect (cf iter)	
rep	repet, rpt	repetitive numeral	
rep	repet, rpt	repeated word in repetition	
res	resu, result	resultative (res.n resultative noun)	
	res	resignative	
	resid	residue class	
	return	returnative	
	rev	revisionary	
	rf	referential-focus	
	rln	relational	
	rsm, res	resumptive marker, resumptive pronoun	
resp		respect	
	resp	responsive	
ret	retro	retrospective (recollection; synonym for 'perfect' in some traditions) (pretro past retrospective)	
rev		reversative, reversive	
	rev	reverential	
	r/m	reflexive/middle voice	
	rm	relative marker	
	rnr	result nominalizer	
root	r, $	(empty tag to mark second element of a divided root)	
roy		royal (e.g. pronouns)	
	rp	recent past, = rec.pst	
	rp	remote past, = rem.pst	
	rp	reflexive-possessive	
	rpc	remote past continuous	
	rpi	remote past inferred	
	rpr	remote past reported	
	rpst	remote past	
rpt	rprt, rep, rpr, revid	reported evidential (= hsy); reportative	
	rpv	remote past visual	
rq	rhet, rqt	rhetorical question	
	r/r, rr, r	reflexive/reciprocal	
	rsn	reason	
rst	rest, res, rstr	restrictive (restrictive numeral, adverbial)	
	rt	roundtrip	
rv	rf	reason voice/focus/trigger	
	-s	subjective (abls subjective ablative, evits subjective evitative), 3fs 3f subject	
	sa	speaker authority (cf. aa)	
	saa	speaker-addressee authority	
	sal	salient	
sap		speech-act participant (cf. msap)	
sbel	subel	subelative case ('from under')	
	sben	self-benefactive	
sbess	sube cn?, subess	subessive case ('under')	
sbj	subj, s, S/A, sbjt, sj	subject case, subject agreement (nsbj non-subject)	
	sbv, subj	subjective, subjective speaker perspective	
scep		sceptical	
	sd	sudden-discovery tense	
	sds	simultaneous event, different subject	
se		same event (cf ss) (se.da same event, different argument/subject)	
sec		second-hand (sec.ev secondhand evidential, imp.sec secondhand imperative)	
sej		sejunct (opposite of conjunct)	
sem	smlf, semel	semelfactive aspect ('once')	
	sem	special evaluative marker	
sen	sns, sens, sens.ev	sensory evidential mood, = vis+aud (nvsen non-visual sensory)	
sep		spatial separation, separative	
seq	sq	sequential	
ser		serial marker	
	sf	subject focus	
	sf	stem formation	
	sf	sentence-final marker	
	sfn	softener	
	sfoc	sentence focus	
	sfp, sfs	sentence-final particle/suffix	
sg	s, sing	singular (but 1sg also 1s, 3sg.m also 3ms)	
sgv	sgt, sing, singl, sglt	singulative number, singulative nominal	
	sh	subject honorific	
sim	simul	simultaneous aspect, simultaneity	
simv	sim, sml	similative (e.g. plural based on prototypical member of group)	
	sin	singular intransitive action	
	sinv	inverted subject	
sit		situative (situational aspect)	
sjv	sbjv, subj, subjv, sub, sb, su	subjunctive mood (sub and subj may be ambiguous with 'subject')	
skt	kst	suck-teeth (= kiss-teeth)	
	sl	same level (spatial deixis)	
	sm	series marker	
smbl	sembl	semblative	
	smi	semeliterative	
	smr	same reference	
	so	same object	
soc		sociative case (socialis)	
soc		sociative causative	
sp	spc, spec, spcf, specfc	specific, specifying (nsp, nspc, nspec nonspecific: cf. also nsp entry)	
	sp	sentence particle (= fp). See usage note at particle and fp.	
	sp	simple past, perfective past	
	sp	subject prefix	
	sp	speaker: sp.prox speaker-proximate, dem.sp demonstrative near speaker	
	spat	spatial	
specfr	spec	specifier	
specl	spec	speculative mood	
spkr		speaker-anchored, speaker perspective	
	spl	spotlighting	
	spont	spontaneous	
	sr	same referent	
	sr	switch reference	
	src, so	source	
	srp	self-reporting pronoun	
ss	sa	same-subject/actor/argument marker (cf se)	
	sso	same-subject overlap ('while')	
	sss	same-subject succession ('then')	
	sss	simultaneous event, same subject (sssi of intransitive clause, ssst of transitive clause)	
stat	stv, st, sta, stt	stative aspect, stative verb	
stem	st, $	(empty tag to mark second element of a divided stem)	
	stim	stimulative	
	str	strong	
sub		sublocative (under). May be equivalent to subess or subl. Compounded for sube(ss) (sbess), subl(at) (sbdir), subel (sbel) etc. if a single morpheme, as sub-ess, sub-lat or sub-dir, sub-ela etc. if not.	
	sub, subv	subitive.	
subl	sbdir, sublat, subdir	sublative case ('down under'), also 'subdirective'	
subr	sub, subord, sbrd, sr	subordinator ('that'), subordinate	
	subs	subsequent	
	subsec	subsecutive mood	
	subst	substitutive	
	subz, sbst	substantivizer (= nominalizer)	
	suc	successive ('then')	
	sug	suggestive mood	
sup		supine	
sup	sprl	superlative (most: cf. super-lative, super-essive)	
	sup, supl cn?, suppl	supplicative, supplication	
supel	srel, superel	superelative case ('from on top of', 'from above')	
super	sup-, spr	superlocative. May be equivalent to superess or superl. Compounded for supere(ss) (supess), superl(at) (supdir), superel (supel), superabl etc. if a single morpheme, as super-ess, super-lat or super-dir, super-ela etc. if not.	
supess	sup, supe cn?, sress, spress, super, superess cn?	superessive case ('above'; 'on')	
supl	suplat, supdir, srdir, spr	super-lative, superdirective ('to above')	
supp	psup, presupp	suppositive, presuppositive, presumptive, suppositional, presupposition	
	surp	surprise	
	svc	serial verb construction	
	sw	switch	
	sym	symmetric	
-t		trigger (used for at, pt, gt etc.) [old fashioned; 'voice' is now standard]	
	-t	thematic (tamt thematic tense-aspect-mood, antt thematic antecedent, etc.)	
	t, tmp	temporal	
ta	t/a	tense/aspect	
tag		tag question	
tam	tma	tense–aspect–mood	
tamp		tense–aspect–mood plus person/number	
tel		telic aspect (cf pfv) (a:tel anticipatory telic, c:tel culminatory telic)	
tel		contrastive emphasis	
temp	tem	temporal case; temporal converb	
	temp	temporarily	
	tens	number of tens (in a numeral)	
tent		tentative	
ter	term, termin	terminative ~ terminalis ('up to') (case, aspect)	
	term	non-subject	
	th, thm, them, themat	thematic element (e.g. thematic consonant, suffix); theme	
	tj	trajector	
tkn		teknonym	
	tm-	tense marker: tmhrs, tmdays, tmyrs for events hours, days, years ago	
	tnd	tendency	
tns	t, tens, ts	tense Lehmann (2004) recommends avoiding this and specifying the tense.	
top	tp, tpc	topic marker (topp topical patientive)	
	topz, topr	topicalizer	
tot		totalitative, totality	
tr	trans, trns	transitive verb (trz, trr transitivizer); transitive case (rare)	
	tr	transitional sound	
	tr	trajector	
	transf, trnsf	transformative case ('becoming', dynamic equiv. of essive)	
	transp	(transposition of deictic zero away from ego, e.g. 'uphill' from an object rather than from the speaker)	
transl	tra, tral, trans, trnsl, translv cn?, translat, trl^{translative}, tsl^{translocative}	translative case (becoming, into)	
transl	tra, tral, trans, trnsl, translv cn?, translat, trl^{translative}, tsl^{translocative}	translocative (across; may be compounded for e.g. ant-trans pass in front of, post-trans pass behind, sub-trans pass under)	
tri	trl, tr	trial number	
	trip	retriplication [note: usually best to gloss with the meaning and ⟨~⟩]	
	trm	transmutative	
trn		transnumeral (neither sg nor pl)	
	plv	plurative number	
	trposs	transfer of possession	
trz	tz	transitivizer	
	ts	thematic suffix	
	ts	tense	
	tv	thematic vowel	
tvf		truth-value focus	
	u	uninflected (aux.u uninflected auxiliary)	
	ua	unit augmented	
	uc	upcoast	
	uf	uncertain future	
	ugr, ug, und, u cn?	undergoer role (cf pat)	
	uh	uphill, inland (= afw. cf ur.)	
	ul	upper level (spatial deixis)	
	uncert	uncertain mood	
	unif	unified	
unsp	unspec	unspecified (person, tense)	
	unw	'unwillingness' marker	
	up	upward	
ur		upriver (cf uh away from the water)	
	usit	usitative, for usual, customary or typical events	
util		utilitive	
uv	uf	undergoer voice/focus/trigger (= { pv + lv + cv })	
	uv	uncertain visual	
	uwpst	unwitnessed past	
	v	viewer	
-v		trigger (used for av, pv, lv, cv etc.)	
	va	verbal adjective	
	vai	intransitive animate verb	
val		valency-increasing; valence marker	
	val	validator	
vb	V	verbal (as a gloss in vbz, vz verbalizer, vpl verbal plural = plur, vcl verb class, vd verbal dative, vall verbal allative, etc.)	
vbz	vblz, vblzr, verb, verbl, vbzr, vlz, vr, vz	verbalizer	
	vespert	vespertinal (in the evening)	
	vcl	verb class marker / classifier	
	vco	voluntary comitative	
V_{d}	vd, v.d.	verb, ditransitive (e.g. as a covert category)	
ve	veg	vegetable (food) gender. Some authors distinguish ve gender from veg food affix.	
ven	vent	venitive/ventive (coming towards; cf andative)	
ver		veridical, veridical mood (certain conditional; cf. pot)	
	verif	verificative	
	vers	versionizer; versative	
vert		vertical classifier	
V_{i}	vi, v.i.	verb, intransitive (e.g. as a covert category)	
vet		vetitive / vetative mood	
via		vialis case	
	vii	intransitive inanimate verb	
	vir	virile animacy (a subset of masculine gender)	
virt		virtual mode	
vis	vs, vevid	visual evidential (pres.vis present visual, vis.p previous visual evidence)	
vis	vs, vevid	visible (demonstrative, e.g. _{3vis})	
	vloc	verbal locative	
vn		verbal noun	
	vnv	verbal cyclical expansion (cf. nvn)	
voc		vocative case	
vol		volitive mood; volitional (cf. avol avolitional)	
	vp	verbal particle	
V_{r}	vr, v.r.	verb, reflexive (e.g. as a covert category)	
	vsm	verb-stem marker	
V_{t}	vt, v.t.	verb, transitive (e.g. as a covert category)	
	vta	transitive animate verb	
	vti	transitive inanimate verb	
	wh.ex	exclamatory wh- clause ('what a ...!')	
	wh	interrogative pronoun (wh-word), wh- agreement	
whq	wh.q	wh- question	
wit		witnessed evidential (cf. exp)	
	wp, wpst	witnessed past	
x	?	(unidentified morpheme)	
	ynq, pq, p.int, pi	yes–no question, polar question/interrogative (e.g. pc vs cq)	
	-z	-(al)izer (e.g. adjz adjectivizer, nz nominalizer, trz transitivizer, vbz verbalizer)	
zo		zoic gender (animals)	

=== Kinship ===
It is common to abbreviate grammatical morphemes but to translate lexical morphemes. However, kin relations commonly have no precise translation, and in such cases they are often glossed with anthropological abbreviations. Most of these are transparently derived from English; an exception is 'Z' for 'sister'. (In anthropological texts written in other languages, abbreviations from that language will typically be used, though sometimes the single-letter abbreviations of the basic terms listed below are seen.) A set of basic abbreviations is provided for nuclear kin terms (father, mother, brother, sister, husband, wife, son, daughter); additional terms may be used by some authors, but because the concept of e.g. 'aunt' or 'cousin' may be overly general or may differ between communities, sequences of basic terms are often used for greater precision. There are two competing sets of conventions, of one-letter and two-letter abbreviations:

1-Letter Gloss	2-Letter Gloss	Meaning	Equivalent sequence of nuclear relations
A	Au	aunt	= MZ or FZ / MoSi or FaSi
B	Br	brother	[basic term]
C	Ch	child	= S or D / So or Da
	Cu	cousin	= MZD, MZS, MBD, MBS, FZD, FZS, FBD, FBS = MoSiDa, MoSiSo, MoBrDa, MoBrSo, FaSiDa, FaSiSo, FaBrDa, FaBrSo
D	Da	daughter	[basic term]
e, E	o, el	elder/older	(e.g. eB, eZ)
Ego	ego	ego (center of reference)	(EgoE = one's spouse)
ex	ex	ex-	(e.g. exH, exW)
F	Fa	father	[basic term]
	F	female kin	
G	Gr	grand-	e.g. GF = PF (MF or FF); GS = CS (SS or DS) e.g. GrFa = PaFa (MoFa or FaFa); GrSo = ChSo (SoSo or DaSo)
	Gen	generation	(see below)
H	Hu	husband	[basic term]
LA	La	-in-law	e.g. BLA = WB or HB or ZH / BrLa = WiBr or HuBr or SiHu
M	Mo	mother	[basic term]
	M	male kin	
	Ne	nephew	= BrSo or SiSo
	Ni	niece	= BrDa or SiDa
P	Pa	parent	= M or F / Mo or Fa
S	So	son	[basic term]
SI, G	Sb	sibling	= B or Z / Br or Si
SP, E	Sp	spouse	= H or W / Hu or Wi
	st	step-	
U	Un	uncle	= MB or FZ / MoBr or FaBr
W	Wi	wife	[basic term]
y, Y	y, yo	younger	(e.g. yB, yZ)
Z	Si	sister	[basic term]
(m.s.)	(m.s.)	male speaking	(when kin terms differ by gender of speaker)
(f.s.)	(f.s.)	female speaking	(when kin terms differ by gender of speaker)
μ	♂	male ego	(when kin terms differ by gender of the person they are related to)
φ	♀	female ego	(when kin terms differ by gender of the person they are related to)
∥	∥	parallel	(across a brother–brother or sister–sister link)
+	+	cross	(across a brother–sister link)
os	os	opposite sex (of ego)	(some langs distinguish siblings of the same and opposite gender from the ego; e.g. for some Tok Pisin speakers, a woman's susa (osSb, from English 'sister') is her brother and her brata (ssSb, from English 'brother') is her sister)
ss	ss	same sex (as ego)	cf. os (opposite sex) above

These are concatenated, e.g. MFZS = MoFaSiSo 'mother's father's sister's son', yBWF = yBrWiFa 'younger brother's wife's father'. 'Elder/older' and 'younger' may affix the entire string, e.g. oFaBrSo (an older cousin – specifically father's brother's son), MBDy (a younger cousin – specifically mother's brother's daughter) or a specific element, e.g. MFeZS 'mother's father's elder sister's son', HMeB 'husband's mother's elder brother'.

'Gen' indicates the generation relative to the ego, with ∅ for the same (zero) generation. E.g. Gen∅Ch (child of someone in the same generation, i.e. of a sibling or cousin); ♂Gen+1F (female one generation up, i.e. mother or aunt, of a male); Gen−2M (male two generations down, i.e. grandson or grandnephew).

'Cross' and 'parallel' indicate a change or lack of change in gender of siblings in the chain of relations. Parallel aunts and uncles are MoSi and FaBr; cross-aunts and uncles are FaSi and MoBr. Cross-cousins (+Cu) and parallel cousins (∥Cu) are children of the same. Parallel niece and nephew are children of a man's brother or woman's sister; cross-niece and nephew are the opposite. 'Elder' and 'younger' occurs before these markers: o∥Cu, y+Cu, and the gender of the ego comes at the very beginning, e.g. ♂o∥CuF, ♀y+CuM.

== Literature ==
- Leipzig Glossing Rules
- Payne, Thomas E. 1997. Describing Morphosyntax.
- Summary of case forms: Blake, Barry J. (2001) [1994]. Case (Second ed.). Cambridge: Cambridge University Press. pp. 195–206.
