= Andative and venitive =

Verb forms in linguistics

In linguistics, andative and venitive (abbreviated and and ven) are a type of verbal deixis: verb forms which indicate 'going' or 'coming' motion, respectively, in reference to a particular location or person. Other terms sometimes seen are itive and ventive, or translocative and cislocative. They generally derive historically from the verbs go and come being reduced to auxiliary verbs or verbal affixes, and may in turn be grammaticalized to aspectual morphemes. Many languages of Siberia (such as Itelmen, Forest Nenets, Chukchi, Alyutor), California, West Africa (such as Akan), the Caucasus-Mideast-North Africa (Akkadian, Sumerian), and Oceania have such verb forms.

A language with andative and venitive forms may also use them with a verb to carry, for example, to create the meanings of "bring" (venitive) and "take (away)" (andative).

== Lithuanian ==
The Lithuanian language marks direction towards and away from the deictic centre when movement verbs are used much like, but even more so, than Slavic languages. This makes up a very important part of Lithuanian grammar, as it is added to many of the most used verbs (movement verbs). In the general sense, the proclitic "at" shows movement towards the listener or the deictic centre and "iš" shows movement from or away from it.

Rytoj atvažiuosiu pas tave
tomorrow {TOWARDS.travel.FUT.1S (by vehicle)} to you.ACC
"I will travel to you tomorrow."

Aš išvažiuosiu dabar, nes man blogai
I.NOM {AWAY.travel.FUT.1S (by vehicle)} now, because I.DAT bad.ADV
"I will leave now since I am feeling bad."

As it can be understood from the examples, the particles "at" and "iš" help Lithuanians specify the relation of the movement intended with the deictic centre. As a result of this, different nuances can be obtained from not using these particles, similar to the feeling provided in English by using "I will go to you" vs "I will come to you".

Several other verbs which can and do use these particles are: eiti (to go by foot), nešti (to carry), skristi (to fly), vairuoti (to pilot, to drive), etc.

Nonetheless, the meanings of these directional particles have widened over time to the point that they bring a different shade of meaning but related to the concept they originally stood for. And this has happened with many other Lithuanian prepositions and prefixes; remarkable is the drift suffered by positional prepositions, which are now also used to express cause in a genuine system which is both complex and unique to the Lithuanian language, and about which comprehensive information can be found at: http://www.lituanus.org/1999/99_1_07.htm.

To provide an example, the meaning of "at" is very likely derived from its Indo-European origin in the particle *ád|, meaning "near, at". As a result of this, this prefix can be used in a derivative way in order to create a new word with a different meaning from an existing word. The meaning of this new word could be more or less similar to that of the original term. Thus, from the verb "pažinti" (to know (as in a person or a fact)), we get "atpažinti" (to tell apart, to know which one it is (from a group)).

== Polynesian ==
Proto-Polynesian is reconstructed as having four directional particles used for verbs: venitive *mai, andative *atu, upwards (uphill, inland) *hake, and downwards (downhill, seawards) *hifo.

In the Tokelauan language, the Polynesian venitive and andative particles mai and atu have evidential uses, and are used in aspectual constructions, mai for continuative aspect ("going on") and atu for inchoative aspect ("coming to be").

The Vanuatu language Lenakel has not only a venitive suffix, but also a suffix that indicates that the action is directed towards the person addressed, as well as a neutral suffix that indicates that the action is directed neither towards the speaker nor towards the person addressed.

ieramɨra r-armwiɡ m-ɨni-pa to kat-lau
chief 3SG-rise and-say-VEN DAT INCL-we-DU
"The chief rose and spoke to both of us."

== Sumerian ==
While the so-called conjugational prefixes of Sumerian have been interpreted in different ways, one of the most common views involves the following analysis:

lugal im-ĝen-Ø
king PREFIX(*).VEN-go-3SG.SUBJ
"The king came"

But:

lugal ì-ĝen-Ø
king PREFIX(*)-go-3SG.SUBJ
"The king went (away)"

(*) The prefix ì- has no grammatical or lexical meaning. It is used, because each finite verb form must have at least one prefix.

The venitive prefix is also frequently used with verbs that do not express a movement:

lugal-e é mu-n-ŕú-Ø
king-ERG temple VEN-3SG.AG-build-3SG.PAT
"The king built the temple (up)"

Currently, sumerologists use the variant term ventive rather than venitive.

== Karajá ==
Karajá, a Macro-Jê language of central Brazil, is unusual in requiring all verbs to be inflected for direction, whether they semantically imply motion or not. Two mutually-exclusive directions are marked in Karajá verbal inflection: "centrifugal" (away from the speaker or topic), indicated by the prefix d-; and "centripetal" (toward the speaker or topic), indicated by the prefix r-. Karajá lacks any verbs of inherent (lexical) direction, like e.g. English come or go; direction marking is entirely dependent on inflection. Examples follow; note that complex morphophonological processes often obscure underlying forms, and that in some verbs - e.g. -lɔ, "to enter" - the centrifugal direction is unmarked.

	-a, "to move"	-lɔ, "to enter"	-ʊrʊ, "to die"
centrifugal	ka- r- ∅- a =kəre 1- CTFG- INTR- move =FUT "I will go (from here)"	b- ∅- a- lɔ =kɛ 2- CTFG- INTR- enter =POT "Go inside!"	∅- r- ∅- ʊrʊ =r -e 3- CTFG- INTR- die =CTFG -IMP "He died (?from here)"
centripetal	ka- d- ∅- a =kəre 1- CTPT- INTR- move =FUT "I will come (to here)"	bə- d- a- lɔ =kɛ 2- CTPT- INTR- enter =POT "Come inside!"	∅- d- ∅- ʊrʊ =d -e 3- CTPT- INTR- move =CTPT -IMP "He died (?to here)"

Since verbs like die obviously cannot encode direction as such, the category of "direction" in Karajá includes various conceptually-related distinctions. Verbs marked as centripetal often convey an emotional relevance to the speaker, whereas verbs marked as centrifugal imply detachment (compare the English metaphor of emotional distance). Similarly, imperatives marked as centripetal such as bədʊnə̃kɛ "sit down!" have a more friendly hortative tone than imperatives marked as centrifugal. Direction marking can also imply a proximate / obviate distinction, especially in narrative texts, where the most salient character or location is chosen as the deictic centre. It can also convey a certain evidential stance, where progressive verbs marked as centripetal imply that the speaker is a direct witness to an ongoing event: nariadɛrɪ "he is walking [I'm witnessing it]", or "look, he's walking".

== Circassian ==
In the Circassian languages (such as Adyghe and Kabardian), the spatial orientation of an action relative to the deictic center is marked primarily by the venitive (or cislocative) prefix къ- (qV-). When this prefix is absent, the verb generally defaults to an andative (movement away from the center) or a spatially neutral direction. Adding the prefix explicitly reorients the action towards the active deictic center.

For basic verbs of motion, the prefix categorically shifts the meaning from "going" to "coming," or "taking" to "bringing":

- макӏо (/ma-kʷʼa/, "goes") → къакӏо (/qa-kʷʼa/, "comes")
- ехьы (/ja-ħə/, "takes away") → къехьы (/q-ja-ħə/, "brings here")

=== The imperative mood and implicit beneficiaries ===
Much like the pragmatic distinction in English where one says "come to me" rather than "go to me," Circassian rigorously applies this spatial logic. It is obligatory for verbs of transfer, communication, and interaction whenever the action is directed inward toward the speaker.

When the first-person indirect object marker -с- ("me") is explicitly included in the verb, the venitive prefix is grammatically obligatory, because the action definitively targets the speaker as the deictic center:

- къысэт (/qə-sa-t/ [VEN-1SG.IO.DAT-give]) — "give it to me"
- къысаӏу (/qə-sa-ʔʷ/ [VEN-1SG.IO.DAT-say]) — "say it to me"
- къысэплъ (/qə-sa-pɬ/ [VEN-1SG.IO.DAT-look]) — "look at me"

However, the venitive prefix is so spatially absolute that it can imply the speaker is the target even when the first-person pronoun is entirely absent. In the bare imperative mood, the prefix alone reorients the command "hither" (toward the speaker's space):

- ты (/tə/, "give [away]") → къэт (/qa-t/, "give it here")
- дзы (/d͡zə/, "throw [away]") → къэдз (/qa-d͡z/, "throw it here")

It is important to emphasize that even though forms like къэт and къэдз do not explicitly contain the first-person -с-, they are inherently understood out of context as "give it to me" or "throw it to me." Because the prefix grounds the action in the speaker's "here," a command to perform an action into that space pragmatically defaults to the speaker as the beneficiary. This mirrors how the English verbs "come" and "bring", when spoken in isolation, automatically default to the speaker's location without needing to explicitly say "to me."

=== Shifting deictic centers ===
A defining feature of the Circassian venitive system is that the deictic center fluidly shifts depending on the context. It does not exclusively mean "toward the speaker," but rather "toward the relevant here."

When a venitive verb form is used without an explicitly stated directional object, the prefix automatically anchors the action to the listener. For example, if a speaker says Скъаплъэ (/s-qa-pɬa/, "I look") or Къэсэдзы (/qa-sa-d͡zə/, "I throw it") completely out of context, it is inherently understood as "I am looking toward you" or "I am throwing it to you." This mirrors the pragmatic behavior of the English phrases "I'm coming" or "I'm bringing it," which, when spoken directly to a listener, automatically imply "to you" rather than an undefined location.

This spatial logic dictates all interactions directed at the listener (the 2nd person):

- Сэ о ар къыосэты (/sa wa a-r qə-wa-sa-tə/) — "I give it to you"
- Ащ о ар къыуеты (/a-ɕ wa a-r qə-wa-ja-tə/) — "He gives it to you"
- Сэ о ар къыплъэсэдзы (/sa wa a-r qə-p-ɬa-sa-d͡zə/) — "I throw it toward you"

Readers can compare this to shifting perspectives in English narrative. In English, one might say "I went to him" (focusing on leaving) versus "I came to him" (focusing on his location). Circassian formally encodes these shifts:

- Inverse interactions (3rd person): In narrative discourse, the prefix frequently functions as a quasi-inverse marker regulating the flow of interaction between two characters. If Person A speaks to Person B, they might use the andative: риӏуагъ (/r-jə-ʔʷa-ʁ/, "he said it to him"). However, Person B's reply will track back to the conversational center using the venitive: къыриӏожьыгъ (/qə-r-jə-ʔʷa-ʑə-ʁ/, "he said it back to him").
- Distal non-motion: When applied to non-motion verbs, the prefix fulfills an ablative-venitive function. It indicates that the action took place at a distal location ("over there"), but the narrative focus has since returned "here".
  - Сэ рестораным скӏуи скъыщышхагъ — "I went to the restaurant and ate there [and returned]."
  - Сэ Америкэм скъыщеджэгъагъ — "I studied in America [and returned]."
