= Hesternal tense =

Grammatical tense indicating "yesterday"

A hesternal tense (abbreviated HEST) is a past tense for the previous day. (Hesterno die is Latin for 'yesterday'.)

Hesternal tense refers to an event which occurred yesterday (in an absolute tense system) or on the preceding day (in a relative tense system). A pre-hesternal tense refers to an event which occurred prior to yesterday or the previous day. Hesternal tense is reported, for example in the Fyam or Fyem language of northern Nigeria.

Hesternal tense may also be used to denote a tense for any time prior to the current day – that is, to mean pre-hodiernal.
