= Legal charge =

Legal charge may refer to:

== Business ==
- Security interest

== Law ==
- Information (formal criminal charge), a formal charge in a common law court
- Indictment, a count, a formal charge by a court
- Criminal accusation
