= CQO =

CQO or cqo may refer to:

- Chief quality officer, a corporate title responsible for quality assurance
- cqo, an abbreviation for the consequential mood, meaning "because", in the Eskaleut languages
- cqo(), a library subroutine that fits a type of vector generalized linear model
- CQO, an 64-bit x86 instruction; see x86_instruction_listings#Added_with_x86-64
