= Multiplicative =

Multiplicative may refer to:

- Multiplication
- Multiplicative function
- Multiplicative group
- Multiplicative identity
- Multiplicative inverse
- Multiplicative order
- Multiplicative partition
- Multiplicative case
- For the multiplicative numerals once, twice, and thrice, see English numerals
