= Assumptive mood =

Epistemic grammatical mood

The assumptive mood (abbreviated ASS) is an epistemic grammatical mood found in some languages, which indicates that the statement is assumed to be true, because it usually is under similar circumstances, although there may not be any specific evidence that it is true in this particular case. An English example (although assumptive mood is not specially marked in English), would be, "That must be my mother. (She always comes at this time.)" Another example in English, using a different modal verb, would be, "He should be a good worker. (He has 15 years of prior experience.)"

The assumptive mood can be found in the Wintu language, an extinct Native American language once spoken in California. An example of a Wintu sentence demonstrating this grammatical mood is:

tima min-elʔ piraꞏ-ʔel
cold die-EXPECT starve-EXPECT
"He might freeze to death, he might starve."
