= Volitive modality =

Modality indicating desires or fears

Volitive modality (abbreviated vol) is a linguistic modality that indicates the desires, wishes or fears of the speaker. It is classified as a subcategory of deontic modality.

== Realisation in speech ==
Volitive moods are a category of grammatical moods that are used to express volitive modality. Examples are the optative, desiderative and imprecative moods. However, many languages (like English) have other ways to express volitive modality, for example modal verbs ("Wish that you were here!", "May he live forever!").

=== Esperanto ===
Esperanto has a volitive verb form that is formed by adding a -u to the verb stem and used to indicate that an action or state is desired, requested, ordered, or aimed for. The verb form is formally called volitive, but in practice, it can be seen as a broader deontic form, rather than a pure volitive form, since it is also used to express orders and commands besides wishes and desires.

Examples:

- Venu. ― "Come." (a request or command)
- Donu ĝin al mi. ― "Give it to me." (a request or command)
- Ni faru tion. ― "Let's do that." (a desire or aim)
- Mi iru dormi. ― "I ought to go to sleep." (expresses the desirability of the action)
- Via infano sukcesu en la vivo. ― "May your child be successful in life." (a wish or desire)
- Mi volas, ke vi helpu min. ― "I want you to help me." (a desire)
- Ŝi petas, ke mi silentu. ― "She asks that I be silent." (a request)

== See also ==
- Volition (linguistics)
