= Countercharge =

A countercharge or counter-charge may be:

- counter-charge (bomb disposal)
- counter-charge (warfare)
- counter-accusation
- Misspelling of counterchange; in heraldry, transmuting of tinctures
