= Distributive aspect =

Grammatical aspect

The distributive aspect (abbreviated distr), is an iterative aspect which expresses that an event is applied to members of a group one after another. These members are typically the referents named by the subject of an intransitive verb, or the object of a transitive verb.

It expresses that the action or state denoted by the verb is performed or experienced simultaneously by more than one individual or object.

== Example ==
Russian: Он позапирал двери. "He locked the doors one after another."
Polish: Pozamykał drzwi. "He locked the doors one after another."
