= Hodiernal tense =

Grammatical tense indicating "today"

A hodiernal tense (abbreviated HOD) is a grammatical tense for the current day. (Hodie or hodierno die is Latin for 'today'.)

Hodiernal tenses refer to events of today (in an absolute tense system) or of the day under consideration (in a relative tense system).

Hodiernal past tense refers to events of earlier today (or earlier than the reference point of the day under consideration), while hodiernal future tense refers to events of later today (or later than the reference point of the day under consideration). A post-hodiernal tense is a future tense for events that will occur after today or the day under consideration, while pre-hodiernal is a past tense for events that occurred before today or the day under consideration.

Languages which include or included hodiernal tenses include Mwera, Inuktitut and Classical French (it is suggested that in 17th-century French, the passé composé served as a hodiernal past). Mwotlap (Vanuatu) has a hodiernal future, which is the only absolute tense of its TAM system.

The term 'hodiernal past' was first used in publications in 1968.

It should not be confused with diurnal, a subtype of periodic tense encoding that an action takes place during the day, whether in the past, the present or the future.
