= Dubitative mood =

Epistemic grammatical mood

Dubitative mood (abbreviated DUB) is an epistemic grammatical mood found in some languages, that indicates that the statement is dubious, doubtful, or uncertain. It may subsist as a separate morphological category, as in Bulgarian, or else as a category of use of another form, as of the conditional mood of Italian or French:

Il a été amené à l'hôpital. "He was taken to hospital."
Il aurait été amené à l'hôpital. "He was apparently/He is said to have been/We believe he was/The information we have is that he was taken to hospital."

An example can be taken from Ojibwe, an Algonquian language of North America. Verbs in Ojibwe can be marked with a dubitative suffix, indicating that the speaker is doubtful or uncertain about what they are saying.

aakozi "he is sick"
aakozidog "he must be sick; I guess he's sick; maybe he's sick; he might be sick."

== See also ==
- Responsive predicate
