= Imprecative mood =

Grammatical mood for cursing others

Some languages distinguish between the optative mood and an imprecative mood (abbreviated IMPR). In these languages, the imprecative mood is used to wish misfortune upon others, whereas the optative mood is used for wishes in general. In such a language, "May he lose the race" is in imprecative mood, whereas "May I win the race" would be in optative mood. A commonly given example of a language with an imprecative mood is Turkish, which uses an otherwise obsolete future-tense suffix -esi solely in the third person for curses:

Geber-esi!
die.like.a.dog-IMPR.3SG
"May he die like a dog!"

== Imprecative retorts in English ==
While not a mood in English, expressions like like hell it is or the fuck you are are imprecative retorts. These consist of an expletive + a personal pronoun subject + an auxiliary verb.
