= Temporal case =

Grammatical case that indicates time

In grammar, the temporal case (or Temporalis abbreviated TEMP) is a grammatical case used to indicate a time.

In the Hungarian language its suffix is -kor. For example: hétkor "at seven" or hét órakor "at seven o'clock", éjfélkor "at midnight", karácsonykor "at Christmas". This is one of the few suffixes in Hungarian to which rules of vowel harmony do not apply.

In Finnish its suffix is -lloin / -llöin. For example: milloin - when?; jolloin - when (relative pronoun); tällöin - at this time; silloin - then; tuolloin - at that time.

In Russian the function of temporal case is assumed by Instrumental, e.g. утр-ом (base form is утро) - in the morning, дн-ём (base form is день) - in the daytime/in the afternoon, вечер-ом (base form is вечер) - at night/in the evening, ночь-ю (base form is ночь) - at nighttime/in the night.
