= Deliberative mood =

Grammatical mood that asks whether the speaker should do something

Deliberative mood (abbreviated del) is a grammatical mood that asks whether the speaker should do something, e. g. "Shall I go to the market?"

The Afar language has a deliberative mood, as in aboo "Shall I do (it)?", with the suffix -oo denoting the deliberative.
