= Deontic modality =

Linguistic modality expressing how the world should be

Deontic modality (abbreviated DEO) is a linguistic modality that indicates how the world ought to be according to certain norms, expectations, speaker desires, etc. In other words, a deontic expression indicates that the state of the world (where 'world' is loosely defined here in terms of the surrounding circumstances) does not meet some standard or ideal, whether that standard be social (such as laws), personal (desires), etc. The sentence containing the deontic modal generally indicates some action that would change the world so that it becomes closer to the standard or ideal.

This category includes the following subcategories:

- Commissive modality (the speaker's commitment to do something, like a promise or threat; alethic logic or temporal logic would apply): "I shall help you."
- Directive modality (commands, requests, etc.; deontic logic would apply): "Come!", "Let's go!", "You've got to taste this curry!"
- Volitive modality (wishes, desires, etc.; boulomaic logic would apply): "If only I were rich!"

A related type of modality is dynamic modality, which indicates a subject's internal capabilities or willingness as opposed to external factors such as permission or orders given.

== Realisation in speech ==
Deontic moods are a category of grammatical moods that are used to express deontic modality. An example for a deontic mood is the imperative ("Come!").

However, many languages (like English) have additional ways to express deontic modality, like modal verbs ("I shall help you.") and other verbs ("I hope to come soon."), as well as adverbials (hopefully) and other constructions.

=== Constructed languages ===
==== Esperanto ====
Esperanto has a mood formally called "volitive" which is also used for various directive uses, so it can be seen as a broader deontic mood. However, it is not used to express commissive modality. It is formed by adding -u to the verb stem, and it is used for orders and commands as well as for expressing will, desire, and purpose.

- Estu feliĉa! "(May you) Be happy!"
- Donu al mi panon. "Give me bread."
- Ni iru! "Let's go!"
- Mi legu tion. "Let me read that."
- Mi volas, ke vi helpu min. "I want you to help me."
- Ĉu mi faru tion? "Shall I do that?"

== See also ==
- Angelika Kratzer
- Deontic logic
- Epistemic modality
- Free choice inference
