= Inelative case =

Grammatical case

The inelative case (abbreviated INEL) expresses the notion "from inside" (i.e. "out of").

It can be found in the Lezgian language. For example:

Варшавадай Тегьрандиз саки вад югъ рехъ ава.
Varshavadaj Tehrandiz saki vad jugh reqh ava.
There's almost five days of travel from Warsaw to Tehran.

In Lezgian, it can also expression the notion "(in return) for". For example:

Заз гайи куьмекдай ваз сагърай лугьузва.
Zaz gaji kymekdaj vaz saghraj luhuzwa.
I thank you for the help you have given me.
