= Modal case =

Grammatical case

In linguistics, the modal case (abbreviated MOD) is a grammatical case used to express ability, intention, necessity, obligation, permission, possibility, etc. It takes the place of English modal verbs such as can, could, would, might, may.

This case is only used in the Kayardild and Lardil languages, two of the Tangkic languages of northern Australia.
