= Speculative mood =

Epistemic grammatical mood

Speculative mood (abbreviated SPEC) is an epistemic grammatical mood found in some languages, which indicates that the utterance is based on speculation of the speaker, and not necessarily known to be the case. For example, "The butler could have been the killer."
