= Hortative =

Linguistic modality that encourages or discourages an action

In linguistics, hortative modalities (/ˈhɔːrtətɪv/; abbreviated HORT) are verbal expressions used by the speaker to encourage or discourage an action. Different hortatives can be used to express greater or lesser intensity, or the speaker's attitude, for or against it.

Hortative modalities signal the speaker's encouragement or discouragement toward the addressee's bringing about the action of an utterance.

== Etymology ==
The term hortative dates to 1576, from Late Latin hortatorius "encouraging, cheering", from hortatus, past participle of hortari "exhort, encourage", intensive of horiri "urge, incite, encourage". When encouraging others it becomes exhortative while when including the speaker it becomes cohortative.

== Ambiguity ==
Hortative modalities share semantic and lexical similarities with other modalities, which can lead to confusion between them. Also, hortative constructions rarely have forms that are uniquely their own. The English expression Let's, a contraction of let us, is one such construction. However, let us is used for other functions:

- Andy says to his sister Barbara: "The movie starts in an hour. Let's go." Andy is telling Barbara that they should leave now if they want to make it to the movie on time. (cohortative – mutual encouragement)
- Barbara says to her parent, Chris, "We have finished our chores. Let us go." Barbara is demanding that Chris allow them to go to the movies because they have no more chores to do. (imperative)

The modal '(have) got' is used to express obligations, but is also hortative:

- Chris says to their employee, Ethan, "Donna is out sick today. You've got to be there." Chris is telling Ethan that because his co-worker is sick, he must come to work. (obligatory – being there is required)
- Ethan says to his friend Frankie, "It's gonna be the biggest party of the year. You've got to be there." Ethan is telling Frankie that she should go to the party because it will be the biggest of the year. (exhortative – being there is strongly encouraged)

Further ambiguity may result when hortative formations have many words or appear as adverbially-modified forms of other modalities:

- Frankie says to her friend Greg, "Recently, some cars have been broken into. You might not want to park there." Frankie is cautioning Greg against parking where some cars have recently been broken into. (dehortative – parking there is politely discouraged)

That construction consists of might (a modal of possibility) + not (the negative marker) + want (a volitive lexical modal). Forms such as this one are often misconstrued as other modalities further modified (in this case, volition negated and modified for possibility).

== Imperative-hortative systems ==
Many languages have imperative-hortative systems in which modalities dealing with commands and encouragement are grouped together. That is not the case in English and results in some disagreement among linguists.

Imperatives and hortatives both involve the expression of a wish of the speaker about a future state of affairs. In that respect, they are like optatives, but in contrast to optatives, they convey an appeal to the addressee(s) to help make the future state of affairs true. If the person in control of the desired state of affairs is the addressee(s), the utterance is an imperative. In any other case, it is a hortative. Consider the following examples:

1. May he live a hundred years! (optative)
2. Sing! (imperative)
3. Let's sing! (hortative)

(1) illustrates an optative. It expresses a wish or hope of the speaker, but there is no appeal to the addressee to make it true. (2) and (3) also express a wish of the speaker, but in both cases, there is an appeal to the addressee to help make it true, with the desired future state of affairs specified as that of someone singing. Note that the person(s) supposed to sing is/are the addressee(s) in (2), thus making it a command. In (3), however, the intended singer(s) is/are the addressee(s) together with the speaker, thus effecting the modality of mutual encouragement that the speaker and the addressee(s) are to perform the action.

== Sources ==
- Palmer, Robert L. Mood & Modality. Cambridge University Press, Cambridge. 2001
- Palmer, Robert L. Modality & The English Modals. Longman, London. 1979
