= Alethic modality =

Modality in linguistics

Alethic modality (from Greek ἀλήθεια = truth) is a linguistic modality that indicates modalities of truth, in particular the modalities of logical necessity, contingency, possibility and impossibility.

Alethic modality is often associated with epistemic modality in research, and it has been questioned whether this modality should be considered distinct from epistemic modality which denotes the speaker's evaluation or judgment of the truth. The criticism states that there is no real difference between "the truth in the world" (alethic) and "the truth in an individual's mind" (epistemic). An investigation has not found a single language in which alethic and epistemic modalities would be formally distinguished, for example by the means of a grammatical mood. In such a language, "A circle can't be square", "can't be" would be expressed by an alethic mood, whereas for "He can't be that wealthy", "can't be" would be expressed by an epistemic mood. As we can see, this is not a distinction drawn in English grammar.

"You can't give these plants too much water." is a well-known play on the distinction between perhaps alethic and hortatory or injunctive modalities (it can mean either "it is impossible to give these plants too much water = giving them too much water is harmless" or "you must not give these plants too much water = giving them too much water is harmful"). The dilemma is fairly easily resolved when listening through paralinguistic cues and particularly suprasegmental cues (intonation). So while there may not be a morphologically based alethic mood, this does not seem to preclude the usefulness of distinguishing between these two types of modes. Alethic modality might then concern what are considered to be apodictic statements.

== In Islamic theology (ʿilm al-kalām) ==
In the tradition of Islamic scholastic theology (ʿilm al-kalām), theologians developed modal categories analogous to the alethic modalities of logical necessity, possibility, and impossibility. Specifically, they distinguished between wājib ʿaqlī (وَاجِبٌ عَقْلِيّ, literally “intellectually necessary”), jāʾiz ʿaqlī (جَائِزٌ عَقْلِيّ, “intellectually permissible/possible”), and mustaḥīl ʿaqlī (مُسْتَحِيلٌ عَقْلِيّ, “intellectually impossible”).

These categories function for kalām thinkers as attributes of things in relation to reason and existence rather than merely speaker judgments:

- Wājib ʿaqlī describes that which the intellect cannot affirm its non-existence without contradiction;
- Mustaḥīl ʿaqlī describes that which the intellect cannot affirm its existence without contradiction;
- Jāʾiz ʿaqlī describes that which may or may not exist without contradiction.

For example, in medieval Muslim philosophy the doctrine of the Necessary Existent (وَاجِبُ الْوُجُود) draws explicitly on a modal schema: all beings other than the Necessary Existent are classified as possible (mumkin) or contingent, and hence they require a cause, whereas the Necessary Existent exists “by essence” and does not admit non-existence.

Thus the modal structure of necessity-/possibility-/impossibility is embedded in the Islamic metaphysical and theological discourse. While the terminology differs, the functional parallel to alethic modality is clear: the categories describe how reality is (necessary, possible, or impossible) rather than how a speaker regards it. Some scholars argue that this shows a cross-tradition convergence of modal thinking.

However, there are also differences: in classical kalām these modal categories often serve metaphysical or theological ends (e.g., proofs of God’s existence) rather than purely linguistic or semantic ends. The notion of “intellectual necessity” (*wājib ʿaqlī*) is ontologically weighted in a way that alethic modality in modern modal logic may not always be.

=== Relation to alethic modality ===
From the perspective of modal logic, the kalām categories may be seen as an early or parallel instantiation of alethic modal thinking: they treat “necessity,” “possibility,” and “impossibility” as features of reality (or existence) rather than merely of belief or speech. In this sense, one can reasonably view wājib ʿaqlī, jāʾiz ʿaqlī, and mustaḥīl ʿaqlī as theological analogues to □p (“necessarily p”), ◊p (“possibly p”), and ¬◊p (“impossibly p”), albeit embedded in a broader metaphysical and theological system.

=== Scholarly considerations ===
Some modern scholars caution that equating the kalām categories directly with the alethic modalities of formal logic risks overlooking important differences of context, aim, and terminology. For instance, the kalām usage is primarily metaphysical and theological, and its notion of “necessity” often implies ontological self-existence rather than purely propositional logical truth.

Thus while a direct linear descent from Greek modal logic to the kalām categories is difficult to establish, the structural similarity between alethic modality and the modal categories of Islamic theology is widely acknowledged in academic literature.
