= Consequential mood =

Verb form in some Eskaleut languages

The consequential mood (abbreviated cnsq, less often cns or cqo) is a verb form used in some Eskaleut languages to mark dependent adverbial clauses for reason ('because') or time ('when'). Due to the broader meaning of the term mood in the context of Eskimo grammar, the consequential can be considered outside of the proper scope of grammatical mood.

In Central Alaskan Yup'ik, the consequential expresses the meaning 'because':

nutar-qapiar-aur-llini-a-ata soup-i-lu-ki kenir-lar-a-nka
new-very-continue-apparently-CNSQ-3PL soup-make-SUB-R/3PL cook-HAB-TR.IND-1SG/3PL
'Because they were very fresh, I would cook them, making soup.'

In Central Siberian Yupik the two forms of the consequential mood are used only for the meanings 'when' and 'while', whereas 'because' is expressed by a particle added to the indicative. Similarly, the consequential expresses the meaning of 'when' in North Alaskan Iñupiaq.

The consequential suffix -nga- is a descendant of the Proto-Eskimoan derivational suffix -nga-, whose meaning is 'having Ved', 'having been Ved'.

== Bibliography ==
- de Reuse, Willem Joseph (1988). "Studies in Siberian Yupik Eskimo morphology and syntax". United States -- Texas: The University of Texas at Austin. ProQuest 303732194.
- Jacobson, Steven A. (1990). "Comparison of Central Alaskan Yup'ik Eskimo and Central Siberian Yupik Eskimo". International Journal of American Linguistics. 56 (2): 264–286. doi:10.1086/466153. ISSN 0020-7071. JSTOR 1265132. S2CID 144786120.
- Jacobson, Steven A. (2006). "The participial oblique, a verb mood found only in Nunivak Central Alaskan Yup'ik and in Siberian Yupik". Études/Inuit/Studies. 30 (1): 135–156. doi:10.7202/016154ar. ISSN 0701-1008. JSTOR 42870410.
- Mithun, Marianne (2012). "Exuberant Complexity: The Interplay of Morphology, Syntax, and Prosody in Central Alaskan Yup'ik". Linguistic Discovery. 10 (1). doi:10.1349/PS1.1537-0852.A.408. ISSN 1537-0852.
- Nagai, Tadataka (2006). "Agentive and patientive verb bases in North Alaskan Inupiaq". United States -- Alaska: University of Alaska Fairbanks. ProQuest 305351183.
