= Accusation =

Statement that claims person or entity commit improper deeds, often directed to guilt

An accusation is a statement by one person asserting that another person or entity has done something improper. The person who makes the accusation is an accuser, while the subject against whom it is made is the accused. Whether a statement is interpreted as an accusation may rely on the social environment in which it is made:

What counts as an accusation is often unclear, and what kind of response is warranted is even less clear. Even a purely surface semantic analysis of accusatory language cannot be performed in the absence of social context, including who is making the accusation and to whom it is being made—often the subject of supposedly accusatory language might well interpret the utterance in question as something that he need not respond to.

An accusation can be made in private or in public, to the accused person alone, or to other people with or without the knowledge of the accused person. An accuser can make an accusation with or without evidence; the accusation can be entirely speculative, and can even be a false accusation, made out of malice, for the purpose of harming the reputation of the accused.

== Perceptions and reactions ==
The perceived strength of an accusation is affected by the trustworthiness of the accuser. For example, in investigative journalism:

The claim of wrongdoing relies not on statements attributed to others, as in ordinary news stories, but rather on reportorial fact-finding. An accusation can be made in an authoritative tone because it has originated from research conducted by the journalist, who takes a position by asserting the "true facts" of the story and implicitly urging those in charge to do something about them.

Responses to accusations vary, and may include confession to the assertion, but also often manifest as "a state of denial, minimalization, or externalization".

== Accusations and public relations ==
In journalism, the reporting of an accusation is commonly balanced with an effort to obtain a response to the accusation by the accused person or entity:

Investigative stories are balanced only in the sense that they usually allow their targets the courtesy of a response. The "other side" is told, most often through a villain's admission or dodge, because the nature of the accusation— backed with evidence and confirmed well before a decision is made to publish—is such that there is no refuting it.

There is therefore usually an opportunity for the subject of an accusation to respond to it. An accusation made against a corporation is often treated as a public relations event, in which a business is accused of wrongdoing in order to influence its behavior.

First, the accusation is a small spectacle. It is a small sign that the big, customary social order has broken down, at least for those involved in the market-based relationships.

Second, an accusation is a public portrayal of wrongdoing that deploys iconic claims and keywords in its "event-structuring process." These words define and refine an event in crisp, familiar, easily understood, and unambiguously negative terms. As noted, an accusation is an early warning, a danger-ahead signal of trouble. And it involves a redefining of the situation to find out not only what the wrong is, but also who is wronged and by whom. Inevitably, in this event-defining process the accused becomes an archetypal betrayer.

Third, the accusation is always highly charged. As opposed to the lengthy legal complaint by a federal or state regulator, or the formal brief filed by a complainant in a legal case, the accusation is short and highly condensed. Unlike the formal complaint or criminal charge, the accusation is shorn of legalistic details. The accusation is sharpened through the use of adjectives, provocative headlines, and dramatic story leads. There is never anything neutral about betrayal, about lying, stealing, and cheating in the market.

Fourth, the accusation comes wrapped in a package. It is more than a publicly observable event involving the behavior of market competitors and participants gone wrong. It is an event expressed through catchphrases and keywords.

== Criminal accusations ==
A criminal accusation is a formal accusation made by the state against an individual or enterprise. In addition to the normal elements of an accusation, a criminal accusation specifies that the wrongdoing on the part of the accused constitutes a violation of the law. A criminal accusation may be informally made through a declaration made to the public at large (generally through news media) or by the filing of a formal accusation in a court of law by a person legally entitled to do so, generally on behalf of the state by a criminal prosecutor.

== See also ==
- Allegation
- False accusation
- Indictment
- Information (formal criminal charge)
