= Sensory evidential mood =

Grammatical mood

Sensory evidential mood (abbreviated sens) is one of two kinds of evidential modality. As opposed to reported evidential mood, sensory evidential mood relates the speakers utterances to what the speaker has experienced through their own senses. It is most commonly used to convey what has been heard or seen, but some languages have been reported to include markers for smell.

The Pomo language uses sensory evidential mood to mark for what the speaker knows based on sound. This specific auditory marker can be shown in an example of the statement in Pomo:

č^{h}éemul-nme
{rain fell}-AUD
"It rained (I heard it)."

Here the suffix "-nme" indicates that the speaker heard the rain falling.
