= Multiplicative case =

Grammatical case

The multiplicative case (abbreviated mlt or mltp) is a grammatical case used for marking a number of something ("three times").

The case is found in the Hungarian language, for example nyolc (eight), nyolcszor (eight times), however it is not considered a real case in modern Hungarian linguistics because of its adverb-forming nature.

The case appears also in Finnish as an adverbial (adverb-forming) case. Used with a cardinal number it denotes the number of actions; for example, viisi (five) -> viidesti (five times). Used with adjectives it refers to the mean of the action, corresponding the English suffix -ly: kaunis (beautiful) -> kauniisti (beautifully). It is also used with a small number of nouns: leikki (play) -> leikisti ("just kidding", "not really"). In addition, it acts as an intensifier when used with a swearword: piru -> pirusti.
