= Frustrative mood =

Grammatical mood

In linguistics, the frustrative mood (abbreviated FRUS or FRUSTR) is a grammatical feature in some languages, such as Chorote and Mẽbengokre, that indicates an action did not produce the expected result, or that the action did not occur despite it being anticipated. An example of frustrative mood (translated to English):

- "I cut my fingernails (but they’re still long)."

Additional meanings for this mood include expressing when an action did not occur due to some other requirement not being met, when a past state has been interrupted or ended, or when the speaker wants to convey disappointment about an interruption or ending of an event or state.
