= Realis mood =

Grammatical mood used for statement of fact

A realis mood (abbreviated real) is a grammatical mood which is used principally to indicate that something is a statement of fact; in other words, to express what the speaker considers to be a known state of affairs, as in declarative sentences. Most languages have a single realis mood called the indicative mood, although some languages have additional realis moods, for example to express different levels of certainty. By contrast, an irrealis mood is used to express something that is not known to be the case in reality.

An example of the contrast between realis and irrealis moods is seen in the English sentences "He works" and "It is necessary that he work". In the first sentence, works is a present indicative (realis) form of the verb, and is used to make a direct assertion about the real world. In the second sentence, work is in the subjunctive mood, which is an irrealis mood – here that he work does not necessarily express a fact about the real world (he could be rejecting necessity and refusing to work), but refers to what would be a desirable state of affairs.

However, since mood is a grammatical category, referring to the form a verb takes rather than its meaning in a given instance, a given language may use realis forms for a number of purposes other than their principal one of making direct factual statements. For example, many languages use indicative verb forms to ask questions (this is sometimes called interrogative mood) and in various other situations where the meaning is in fact of the irrealis type (as in the English "I hope it works", where the indicative works is used even though it refers to a desired rather than real state of affairs). The indicative might therefore be defined as the mood used in all instances where a given language does not specifically require the use of some other mood.

Realis mood and indicative mood can be indicated by the respective glossing abbreviations real and ind.

== The English indicative ==
In Modern English, the indicative mood is for statements of actuality or strong probability, and in addition acts as a default mood for all instances which do not require use of a specific mood:

- The spine-tailed swift flies faster than any other bird in the world. (present indicative)
- The Missouri and Mississippi Rivers rose to record heights in 1993. (past indicative)
- Mid-westerners will remember the flooding for many years to come. (future indicative)

Some forms of the indicative can be used with do, does, or did, either for emphasis, or to form questions or negatives. See do-support.

Distinctions between indicative and other moods such as the subjunctive were marked inflectionally to a greater extent in historical forms of the language than in Modern English. The following table shows the indicative suffixes used on regular verbs in Old English, Middle English and early and present-day Modern English.

	Present tense				Past tense		
	Singular			Plural	Singular		Plural
	1st person	2nd person	3rd person	Plural	1st and 3rd person	2nd person	Plural
Old English	-e	-st	-eþ	-aþ	-d-e	-d-est	-d-on
Middle English	-e, -∅	-st, -est	-th, -s	-e(n)	-d(e)	-d-st	-d-e(n)
Early Modern English	-∅	-st, -est	-th, -s	-∅	-d	-d-st	-d
Modern English	-∅		-s	-∅	-d		

Other moods existing in English besides the indicative are irrealis moods: the imperative ("Be quiet!") and the conditional ("I would be quiet") (although this is not always analyzed as a mood) and, in some dialects, the subjunctive (as in "I suggest you be quiet"). For some further information, see English verbs and Uses of English verb forms.

== Other ==
Although the indicative is generally the main or only realis mood, certain other languages have additional forms which can be categorized as separate realis moods.

Arabic and various other Semitic languages have two kinds of energetic moods, which express something which is strongly believed or which the speaker wishes to emphasize. Their exact meanings are dependent upon the prefix that is attached to them. For example, yaktubanna يَكتُبَنَّ is in the long energetic mood and has strong obligation meanings; it means "he certainly writes" and if it is preceded by la, layaktubanna, it will have the meaning of "he must write". The short energetic expresses weak obligation, e.g., yaktuban which means "he almost writes"; if it is preceded by a prefix like la, layaktuban, it means "he should write".

The declarative mood (abbreviated decl) indicates that a statement is true, without any qualifications being made. For many languages this is just an alternative name for the indicative mood, although sometimes distinctions between them are drawn. It may contrast with inferential mood.

Reference is sometimes made to a "generic mood", for making general statements about a particular class of things; this may be considered to be an aspect rather than a mood. See gnomic aspect.

== See also ==
- Evidentiality
- Sensory evidential mood
- Mirativity
- Linguistic modality
