= Optative mood =

Grammatical mood

The optative mood (/ˈɒptətɪv/ OP-tə-tiv or /ɒpˈteɪtɪv/ op-TAY-tiv; abbreviated opt) is a grammatical mood that indicates a wish or hope regarding a given action. It is a superset of the cohortative mood and is closely related to the subjunctive mood but is distinct from the desiderative mood. English has no morphological optative, but various constructions impute an optative meaning. Examples of languages with a morphological optative mood are Ancient Greek, Albanian, Armenian, Georgian, Friulian, Kazakh, Kurdish, Navajo, Old Prussian, Old Persian, Sanskrit, Turkish, and Yup'ik.

== English ==
Although English has no morphological optative, analogous constructions impute an optative meaning, including the use of certain modal verbs:

- May you have a long life!
- Would that I were younger.
- So mote it be.

Periphrastic constructions include if only together with a subjunctive complement:

- If only I were rich!
- I would sing if only I weren't tone deaf.

The optative mood can also be expressed elliptically:

- (May) God save the Queen!
- (May you) Have a nice day.
- (May) God bless America.

The cohortative verb phrases let's (or let us) represent a syntactical mood as a subset of the optative mood:

- Let's try it.
- Let us pray.

== Indo-European languages ==
=== Proto-Indo-European ===
The optative is one of the four original moods of Proto-Indo-European (the other three being the indicative mood, the subjunctive mood, and the imperative mood). However, many Indo-European languages lost the inherited optative, either as a formal category, or functional, i.e. merged it with the subjunctive, or even replaced the subjunctive with optative.

=== Albanian ===
In Albanian, the optative (mënyra dëshirore, lit. "wishing mood") expresses wishes, and is also used in curses and swearing.

- Wish: U bëfsh 100 vjeç! (May you reach/live 100 years)
- Curse: Të marrtë djalli! (May the devil take you)

=== Ancient Greek ===
In Ancient Greek, the optative is used to express wishes and potentiality in independent clauses (but also has other functions, such as contrary-to-fact expressions in the present). In dependent clauses (purpose, temporal, conditional, and indirect speech), the optative is often used under past-tense main verbs. The optative expressing a wish is on its own or preceded by the particle εἴθε (eithe). The optative expressing potentiality is always accompanied by the untranslatable particle ἄν in an independent clause and is on its own in a dependent clause.

Εἴθε βάλλοις
Eíthe bállois
"If only you would throw."

Χαίροιμι ἄν, εἰ πορεύοισθε
Khaíroimi án, ei poreúoisthe
"I would be glad, if you could travel."

In Koine Greek, the optative began to be replaced by the subjunctive; in the New Testament, it was primarily used in set phrases.

Its endings are characterized by a diphthong such as οι (oi) in thematic verbs and ι in athematic verbs.

=== Germanic languages ===
Some Germanic verb forms often known as subjunctives are actually descendants of the Proto-Indo-European optative. The Gothic present subjunctive nimai "may he take!" may be compared to Ancient Greek present optative φέροι "may he bear!" That the old Indo-European optative is represented by the subjunctive is clear in Gothic, which lost the old, "true" Indo-European subjunctive that represented a fixed desire and intent. Its function was adopted by the present form of the optative that reflected only possibilities, unreal things and general wishes at first.

A Germanic innovation of form and functionality was the past tense of the optative, which reflected the irrealis of past and future. This is shown by evidence in the Gothic language, Old High German, Old English, and Old Norse. This use of the (new) optative past tense as an irrealis mood started apparently after the Proto-Germanic past tense that had been once the perfect tense supplanted the Indo-German aorist (compare Euler 2009:184).

A somewhat archaic Dutch saying, Leve de Koning ("long live the king") is another example of how the optative still is present in Germanic languages today.

=== Latin ===
Likewise in Latin, the newer subjunctive is based on the Indo-European optative. With this change in Latin, several old subjunctive forms became future forms. Accordingly, the prohibitive (negative desire and prohibition) was formed with the combination of *ne + verb form in the optative present.

=== Romanian ===
In Romanian, the conditional and optative moods have identical forms, thus being commonly referred to as the conditional-optative mood.

=== Sanskrit ===
In Sanskrit, the optative is formed by adding the secondary endings to the verb stem. It sometimes expresses wishes, requests and commands: bhares "may you bear" (active voice) and bharethās "may you bear [for yourself]" (middle). It also expresses possibilities (e.g. kadācid goṣabdena budhyeta "he might perhaps wake up due to the bellowing of cows") or doubt and uncertainty (e.g., katham vidyām Nalam "how would I be able to recognize Nala?"). The optative is sometimes used instead of a conditional mood.

== Basque ==
Zuberoan dialect has a special mood, called Botiboa (Votive), and unknown to the other dialects, used for making wishes. The auxiliary verb, whose characteristic is the prefix ai-, always precedes the main verb and, in negative wishes, also the negative adverb ez (meaning no, not):

- Ailü ikusi! ('If she/he had only seen it/him/her!').
- Ailü ikusi! ('If he/she hadn't only seen her/him/it!').

In Standard Basque, like in all the other dialects, such wishes are made with the particle ahal, and the future indicative tense:

- Arazoa ikusiko ahal du! ('I wish he/she saw the problem').
- Ez ahal du ikusiko! ('I hope she/he will not see her/him/it'): in negative wishes, the particle ahal goes between the negative adverb ez and the verbal auxiliary.

All the dialects have verbal forms in the imperative mood (Agintera), even for commands concerning the 3rd person, both singular and plural:

- Liburua ikus beza! ('May he/she see the book!').
- Liburuak ikus bitzate! ('May they see the books!').

For commands concerning the 1st person, present subjunctive forms are used:

- Liburua ikus dezadan! ('Let me see the book! —it is not asking any listener for permission to see that book, but a personal wish').
- Liburuak ikus ditzagun! ('Let's see the books!').

== Finnish ==
In Finnish, the optative or the second imperative, is archaic, mainly appearing in poetry, and used in suppletion with the first imperative. It is formed using the suffixes -ko- and -kö-, depending on vowel harmony, whereas the first imperative uses the suffixes -ka- and -kä-, both cases subjected to consonant gradation; for instance, kävellös (thou shalt walk) is the active voice second person singular in present optative of the verb kävellä (to walk), and ällös kävele is the negative (don’t walk). (The corresponding first imperative forms are kävele and älä kävele.)

Altogether there can be constructed 28 verb inflections in the optative, complete with active and passive voice, present and perfect, three person forms both in singular and plural and a formal plural form. Most, if not all, of these forms are, however, utterly rare and are not familiar to non-professionals. Only some expressions have remained in day-to-day speech; for instance, one can be heard to say ollos hyvä instead of ole hyvä ("you're welcome" or "here you go"). This form carries an exaggerated, jocular connotation.

Optative formality can be expressed with the 1st and the 2nd imperative. For example, the ninth Article of the Universal Declaration of Human Rights begins with Älköön ketään pidätettäkö mielivaltaisesti, "Not anyone shall be arrested arbitrarily", where älköön pidätettäkö "shall not be arrested" is the imperative of ei pidätetä "is not arrested". (Also, using the conditional mood -isi- in conjunction with the clitic -pa yields an optative meaning, e.g. olisinpa "if I only were". Here, it is evident that the wish is not, and probably will not be, fulfilled.)

== Japanese ==
The Japanese optative is formed by using a conditional such as ba (-ば) or tara (-たら). For example, "I wish there were more time" is expressed literally as "If there were time, it would be good." (時間があれば良いのに Jikan ga areba ii noni.), where aru, the verb expressing existence, is in the ba conditional form areba. Ii is the present (or non-past) tense of "good," but if expressed in the past tense yokatta よかった, the sentence expresses regret instead of a wish or hope. The above example would become "If there had been time, it would have been good" 時間があればよかったのに, as might be said of an opportunity missed because of a lack of time.

The optative mood can also be expressed by suffixing 様に yō ni to the verb, typically the polite form. For instance, "may you have a pleasant trip" 楽しい旅になります様に.

== Hebrew ==
Although Biblical Hebrew does not have a dedicated optative mood like Ancient Greek or Sanskrit, it frequently expresses optative-like constructions through rhetorical questions, especially those beginning with the interrogative pronoun מי (mi, meaning "who"). These are often used to convey longing or wishful thinking, particularly in poetic and prophetic contexts.

An example of optative-like construct in Hebrew is מי יתן (mi yiten), literally "Who will give?" This phrase is used to express a deep, often unattainable desire in Job 6:8:

- מי יתן תבוא שאלתי (mi yiten tavo she'elati) "Oh, that my request might come to pass."

This conveys the speaker's longing for something beyond their control, functioning similarly to the optative mood in other languages.

Another example is in the Talmud (Avodah Zarah 10b): מי ישים (mi yasim), meaning "Who will place?" This phrase appears in contexts of rhetorical longing:

- מי ישימני מצע תחתיך לעולם הבא (mi yasimeni matz'a tachat'cha le'olam haba) "Who will place me as a mat under you in the World to Come?"

These expressions convey humility and the hope for something only a higher power could grant, akin to the optative mood in expressing desires or hypotheticals.

These rhetorical questions in Hebrew serve a similar function to the optative mood, providing a way to express wishes, hopes, or desires that cannot be directly commanded or expected.

== Mongolian ==
The Mongolian optative or "wishing form" (Хүсэх Хэлбэр) is used largely to "tell another person about a wish not connected to the listener". Colloquially, however, it can also be used for a wishful second person imperative. It is formed by joining the suffix -аасай/-ээсэй/-оосой to the root stem of the verb. e.g. Үзэх= to see. үз—ээсэй.

Миний дүнг ээж үзээсэй
Minii düng eej üzeesei.
"If only mum could see my results."

It can also be used to form wishes in the past tense.

Чи ирсэн баиж ч болоосой
Chi irsen baij ch boloosoi.
"If only you had come."

== Sumerian ==
In Sumerian, the optative of the 1st person is formed differently from the other persons:

Person	Designation	Example (Sumerian)	Translation
1.	Cohortative/hortative	ga-na-b-dug	I want to say it to him/her
2./3.	Precative	ḫe-mu-ù-zu	You should experience it

Thereby, take note that the "normal" indicator of the 1st person in the cohortative (would be a suffix -en) is mostly omitted, as with the cohortative prefix, the 1st person is already expressed. In the case of the precative, the personal indicator has to be used to differentiate between the 2nd and 3rd person.

== Turkic Languages ==
In Balkar, a Turkic language spoken in the North Caucasus, the desiderivative optative is formed by the suffix -ʁa followed by an auxiliary verb:

ders terkiraq bošal-ʁa e-di
lesson soon finish-DES.OPT AUX-PST
"I wish this lesson would be over soon!"

The optative in Turkish is part of the wish mood (dilek kipi) which reflects the command, desire, necessity, or wish. It has several semantic nuances. For instance, the word for "to come" (infinitive: gelmek) is modified in the optative to geleyim. This creates also a one-word sentence and means according to the context

- I may come.
- I come (sometime).
- I want to come (sometime).
- I should (sometime) come.

=== Desire mood ===
Takes the -a or -e suffix.

geleyim, kalasınız

may [I] come, may [you] stay

=== Wish-conditional mood ===
It takes the -sa or -se suffix. The following example reflect a wish:

gelse, kalsanız

if [he/she/it] would come, if [you] would stay

== See also ==
- Permissive mood
- Hortative
