= Desiderative mood =

Grammatical mood

In linguistics, a desiderative (abbreviated DESI or DES) form is one that has the meaning of "wanting to X". Desiderative forms are often verbs, derived from a more basic verb through a process of morphological derivation. Desiderative mood is a kind of volitive mood.

== Sanskrit ==
In Sanskrit, the desiderative is formed through the suffixing of /sa/ and the prefixing of a reduplicative syllable, consisting of the first consonant of the root (sometimes modified) and a vowel, usually /i/ but /u/ if the root has an /u/ in it. Changes to the root vowel sometimes happen, as well. The acute accent, which indicates high pitch in Vedic, is usually placed at the first vowel.

For example:

Base form	Meaning	Desiderative	Meaning
nayati	"he leads"	nínīṣati	"he wants to lead"
pibati	"he drinks"	pípāsati	"he wants to drink"
jīvati	"he lives"	jíjīviṣati	"he wants to live"

== Meadow Mari ==
In Meadow Mari, the desiderative mood is marked by the suffix -не -ne.

=== Positive present ===
Conjugation of the present desiderative positive
Person	1st Dec. pos.	2nd Dec. pos.
1st Singular	лекнем^{2} (I want to go)	мондынем (I want to forget)
2nd Singular	лекнет^{2} (You want to go)	мондынет (You want to forget)
3rd Singular	лекнеже^{2} (He/she/it wants to go)	мондынеже (He/she/it wants to forget)
1st Plural	лекнена^{2} (We want to go)	мондынена (We want to forget)
2nd Plural	лекнеда^{2} (You want to go)	мондынеда (You want to forget)
3rd Plural	лекнешт^{2} (They want to go)	мондынешт (They want to forget)

=== Negative present ===
Conjugation of the present desiderative negative
Person	1st Dec. neg.	2nd Dec. neg.
1st Singular	ынем лек^{2} (I don't want to go)	ынем мондо^{1} (I don't want to forget)
2nd Singular	ынет лек^{2} (You don't want to go)	ынет мондо^{1} (You don't want to forget)
3rd Singular	ынеже лек^{2} (He/she/it doesn't want to go)	ынеже мондо^{1} (He/she/it doesn't want to forget)
1st Plural	ынена лек^{2} (We don't want to go)	ынена мондо^{1} (We don't want to forget)
2nd Plural	ынеда лек^{2} (You don't want to go)	ынеда мондо^{1} (You don't want to forget)
3rd Plural	ынешт лек^{2} (They don't want to go)	ынешт мондо^{1} (They don't want to forget)

== Japanese ==
In Japanese, the desiderative takes two main forms: -tai (-たい) and -tagaru (-たがる). Both forms conjugate for tense and positivity, but in different ways: with the -tai ending, the verb becomes an -i adjective, or a conjugable adjective, while the ending -tagaru (-tai + -garu suffix) creates a godan/yodan verb. Though there are other, compound forms to demonstrate wanting, these two alone are demonstrated because they are inflections of the main verb. These two forms are plain/informal in nature, and can be elevated to the normal-polite and other levels through normal methods.

-tai is an absolute statement of desire, whereas -tagaru indicates the appearance of desire. Generally, one does not say things such as 太郎さんが食べたい 'Tarō wants to eat' because one cannot read Tarō's thoughts; instead, one says 太郎さんが食べたがる 'it appears that Tarō wants to eat.'

=== Godan Verbs ===
		-たい, -tai	-たがる, -tagaru	Meaning
Non-past	Positive	書きたい, kakitai	書きたがる, kakitagaru	'want(s) to write'
Non-past	Negative	書きたくない, kakitakunai	書きたがらない, kakitagaranai	'don't/doesn't want to write'
Past	Positive	書きたかった, kakitakatta	書きたがった, kakitagatta	'wanted to write'
Past	Negative	書きたくなかった, kakitakunakatta	書きたがらなかった, kakitagaranakatta	'didn't want to write'

=== Ichidan Verbs ===
		-たい, -tai	-たがる, -tagaru	Meaning
Non-past	Positive	食べたい, tabetai	食べたがる, tabetagaru	'wants to eat'
Non-past	Negative	食べたくない, tabetakunai	食べたがらない, tabetagaranai	'don't/doesn't want to eat'
Past	Positive	食べたかった, tabetakatta	食べたがった, tabetagatta	'wanted to eat'
Past	Negative	食べたくなかった, tabetakunakatta	食べたがらなかった, tabetagaranakatta	'didn't want to eat'

== Proto-Indo-European ==
Proto-Indo-European likely had a desiderative. In some daughter languages like Albanian, Greek, Indo-Iranian, Balto-Slavic and possibly Celtic, it acquired the meaning of a future tense.
