= Inchoative aspect =

Grammatical aspect

Inchoative aspect (abbreviated inch or incho), also known as inceptive, is a grammatical aspect opposite to the cessative aspect, referring to the beginning of a state. It can be found in conservative Indo-European languages such as Latin and Lithuanian, and also in Finnic languages or European derived languages with high percentage of Latin-based words like Esperanto. It should not be confused with the prospective, which denotes actions that are about to start. The English language can approximate the inchoative aspect through the verbs "to become" or "to get" combined with an adjective.

Since inchoative is a grammatical aspect and not a tense, it can be combined with tenses to form past inchoative, frequentative past inchoative and future inchoative, all used in Lithuanian.

In Russian, inchoatives are regularly derived from unidirectional imperfective verbs of motion by adding the prefix по- po-, e.g. бежать bezhát', побежать pobezhát': "to run", "to start running". Also compare шли shli (normal past tense plural of идти idtí, "to go") with Пошли! Poshlí! meaning approximately "Let's get going!". Certain other verbs can be marked for the inchoative aspect with the prefix за- za- (e.g. он засмеялся on zasmejálsja, "he started laughing", он заплакал on zaplákal "he started crying"). Similar behavior is observed in Ukrainian, and in other Slavic languages.

In Latin, the inchoative aspect was marked with the infix -sc-:

amo, I love; amasco, I'm starting to love, I'm falling in love
florere, to flower, florescere, to start flowering

In Esperanto, any verb is made inchoative by the prefix ek-:

danci, ekdanci: "to dance", "to start dancing"

The term inchoative verb is used by generative grammarians to refer to a class of verbs that reflect a change of state; e. g., "John aged" or "The fog cleared". This usage bears little or no relationship to the aspectual usage described above.
