= Relative and absolute tense =

Possible grammatical tense distinctions

Relative tense and absolute tense are distinct possible uses of the grammatical category of tense. Absolute tense means the grammatical expression of time reference (usually past, present or future) relative to "now" – the moment of speaking. In the case of relative tense, the time reference is construed relative to a different point in time, the moment being considered in the context. In other words, the reference point (or center of deixis) is the moment of discourse or narration in the case of absolute tense, or a different moment in the case of relative tense.

A further distinction has also been made between "strict relative" tense, which merely expresses time relative to the reference point, and "absolute-relative tense" (such as pluperfect), which expresses time relative to the reference point while also placing the reference point in time relative to the present moment.

A relative past tense is sometimes called an anterior tense, while a relative future tense may be called a posterior tense.

== Absolute tense ==
In the case of absolute tense, the grammatical expression of time reference is made relative to the present moment. It has been pointed out that the term is somewhat misleading, since this kind of time reference is not truly absolute, but is relative to the moment of speaking.

Most simple sentences in tensed languages exhibit absolute tense. For example, if Jane says "John went to the party", the use of the past tense (went) implies that the event (John's going) took place at a time which is in the past relative to the moment of Jane's uttering the sentence.

In some cases, the operation of sequence of tenses in indirect speech serves to preserve absolute tense. For example, if Jane says "I like chocolate", and Julie later reports that "Jane said that she liked chocolate", Julie's conversion of the present tense like into the past liked implies a reference to past time relative to the time at which Julie is speaking – the center of deixis is moved from the time of Jane's original utterance to that of Julie's current utterance. As will be seen below, however, this principle does not hold in all languages, and does not always apply even in English.

== Relative tense ==
What is normally encompassed by the term "relative tense" is broken down by Bernard Comrie into strict relative tense and absolute-relative tense.

=== Strict relative tense ===
Comrie's strict relative tense expresses time relative to the reference point provided by the context, without indicating where that reference point lies relative to the present time.

A verb form commonly offered as an example of such a relative tense is the imperfect of Classical Arabic. This indicates an ongoing state of affairs at the moment under discussion, which could be in the past, present or future relative to the moment of speaking. It can therefore be considered to be a relative present tense. (In modern Arabic it has developed into an absolute non-past tense.)

An example of a normally absolute tense being used relatively, in English, is provided by indirect speech placed in the future. If Tom says "John will say that he paid for the chocolate", the past tense paid refers to a past time relative to the moment of John's expected utterance, and not necessarily to a past time relative to the moment of Tom's present utterance. The same is found in some languages even in past indirect speech (where English tends to preserve absolute tense or use absolute-relative tense, as described in the previous and following sections). In Russian, for example, the sentence "Jane said that she liked chocolate" would take the grammatical form "Jane said that she likes chocolate" (see Indirect speech § Russian), where "likes" refers to the present at the time of Jane's reported utterance, and not necessarily the present at the time at which the utterance is reported.

=== Absolute-relative tense ===
Comrie's absolute-relative tense combines the functions of absolute tense and strict relative tense. It reflects both the position in time of the reference point relative to the moment of speaking, and the position in time of the described situation relative to the reference point.

Common tenses of this type are the pluperfect and the future perfect. These both place the situation in the past relative to the reference point (they are anterior tenses), but in addition they place the reference point in the past and in the future, respectively, relative to the time of speaking. For example, "John had left" implies that the reference point is in the past relative to the time of speaking, and that John's leaving occurred before that point. "John will have left" is similar, except that the reference point is in the future relative to the time of speaking. In the case of the future-in-the-past, the reference point is in the past, but the action is placed in the future relative to that point (it can be considered a posterior tense). An example is found in "John would later return to the party" (although the modal auxiliary would can also have other meanings).

Absolute-relative tense is used in indirect speech in some instances. If Julie says "Jane said that John had left", the use of had left places John's leaving in the past relative to the (past) reference point, namely the time of Jane's reported utterance. Similarly, "Jane said that John would leave" places John's leaving in the future relative to the (past) time of Jane's utterance. (This does not apply in all languages or even in all cases in English, as noted in the preceding sections.)

Some languages lack absolute-relative tenses. In Russian, for example, there is no pluperfect or future perfect; these meanings are expressed by absolute past or future tense respectively, with adverbs or other lexical means being used, if required, to express temporal relations with specified reference points.

=== Aspectual analysis ===
Wolfgang Klein proposed to analyze relative tense in terms of the grammatical category of aspect, regarding anterior tense as manifesting perfect (or retrospective) aspect. Similarly, a form that places the action in the future relative to the reference point may be regarded as having either posterior tense or prospective aspect. He argued that the English perfect forms could be treated as combinations of perfect aspect with absolute tense. However, the proposal that aspect generally can explain relative tense has been argued against on the basis of cross-linguistic data.

Some authors use the term anterior to refer to the perfect, and consider it under the heading of (relative) tense. Joan Bybee remarks that "[anterior] seems to resemble a tense more than an aspect, since it does not affect the internal temporal contours of the situation."
