= Epistemic modality =

Type of linguistic modality

Epistemic modality is a sub-type of linguistic modality that encompasses knowledge, belief, or credence in a proposition. Epistemic modality is exemplified by the English modals may, might, must. However, it occurs cross-linguistically, encoded in a wide variety of lexical items and grammatical structures. Epistemic modality has been studied from many perspectives within linguistics and philosophy. It is one of the most studied phenomena in formal semantics.

== Realisation in speech ==
- (a) grammatically: through
  - modal verbs (e.g., English: may, might, must; German: sollen: Er soll ein guter Schachspieler sein "He is said to be a good chess player"),
  - particular grammatical moods on verbs, the epistemic moods, or
  - a specific grammatical element, such as an affix (Tuyuca: -hīyi "reasonable to assume") or particle; or
- (b) non-grammatically (often lexically): through
  - adverbials (e.g., English: perhaps, possibly), or
  - a certain intonational pattern

== Non-canonical environments and objective epistemic modality ==
In 1977, John Lyons started a long discussion regarding in which environments epistemic modal operators can be embedded and from which environments they are banned. He argues that epistemic modal operators compete for the same position as illocutionary operators, such as the assertion operator, question operator or imperative operator. According to him this explains why most epistemic modals in English are not acceptable embedded under questions or negation.

As Lyons finds single lexemes of epistemic modals in English that are used in questions and under negation, he assumes that they must be part of a separate class of epistemic modality–the so called objective epistemic modality, in contrast to subjective epistemic modality—whose operators are considered to be taking the same position in the clause as illocutionary operators.

Which modal lexemes convey an 'objective' epistemic interpretation is subject to much controversy. So far most of the authors who are in favour of a distinct class of objective epistemic modal verbs have not explicitly stated which verbs can be interpreted in an 'objective' epistemic way and which can only be interpreted in an 'subjective' epistemic way.

It is often assumed that, for languages such as English, Hungarian, Dutch and German, epistemic adverbs only involve a subjective epistemic interpretation and can never be interpreted in an objective epistemic way.

Since the publication of Lyons's work, a range of environments have been suggested from which (subjective) epistemic modals are assumed to be banned. Most of these non-canonical environments were motivated by data from English:

- No infinitives
- No past participles
- No past tenses
- Excluded from the scope of a counterfactual operator
- Excluded from nominalisations
- No verbless directional phrase complements
- No VP-anaphora
- No separation in wh-clefts
- May not bear sentence accent
- Excluded from the scope of an negation
- Excluded from polar questions
- Excluded from wh-questions
- Excluded from imperatives
- Excluded from optatives
- Excluded from complement clauses
- Excluded from event-related causal clauses
- Excluded from the antecedent of an event related conditional clause
- Excluded from temporal clauses
- Excluded from restrictive relative clauses
- Excluded from the scope of a quantifier
- No assent/dissent

However, taking a look into languages which have a more productive inflectional morphology such as German, there is solid corpus data that epistemic modal verbs do occur in many of these environments. The only environments in which epistemic modal verbs do not occur in German are as follows.

- they do not occur with verbless directional phrase complements
- they cannot be separated from their infinitive complements in wh-clefts
- they do not undergo nominalisations
- they are exempt from adverbial infinitives
- they cannot be embedded under circumstantial modal verbs
- they cannot be embedded under predicates of desire
- they cannot be embedded under imperative operators
- they cannot be embedded under optative operators

This corpus data further shows that there is no consistent class of objective epistemic modal verbs, neither in English, nor in German. Each of the assumed objective epistemic modals is acceptable in a different range of environments which are actually supposed to hold for the entire stipulated class of objective epistemic modality.

The table below illustrates in which environments the most frequent epistemic modals in German, kann 'can', muss 'must', dürfte 'be.probable', mögen 'may' are attested in corpora (yes), or yield ungrammatical judgements (no). The lower part makes reference to classifications by various authors, which of these epistemic modal verb come with an objective epistemic interpretation and which are only restricted to subjective epistemic modality.

German epistemic modal verbs in non-canonical environments
environment	kann 'can' (very rare)	muss 'must'	dürfte 'be.probable'	könnte 'could'	mögen 'might' (rare)	epistemic Adverbs	particle wohl 'perhaps'
factive complement clause	?	yes	yes	yes	yes	yes	?
causal clause	?	yes	yes	yes	yes	?	yes
temporal clause	?	yes	yes	yes	?	?	yes
event related conditional clause	no	no	?	yes	no	?	no
negation	yes	yes	no	no	no	no	no
information seeking questions	yes	no	yes	yes	no	?	yes
quantifiers	yes	no	no	yes	no	no	
infinitive	yes	yes	no	?	?		
Öhlschläger (1989:207), German	objective, subjective	objective, subjective	objective, subjective			only subjective	
Diewald (1999:82–84,274), German	objective, subjective	objective, subjective		only subjective	only subjective		
Huitink (2008a), Dutch	objective, subjective	objective, subjective					

== Link to evidentiality ==
Many linguists have considered possible links between epistemic modality and evidentiality, the grammatical marking of a speaker's evidence or information source. However, there is no consensus about what such a link consists of. Some work takes epistemic modality as a starting point and tries to explain evidentiality as a subtype. Others work in the other direction, attempting to reduce epistemic modality to evidentiality. Still others recognize epistemic modality and evidentiality as two fundamentally separate categories, and posit that particular lexical items may have both an epistemic and an evidential component to their meanings. However, other linguists feel that evidentiality is distinct from and not necessarily related to modality. Some languages mark evidentiality separately from epistemic modality.

== See also ==
- Alethic modality
- Deontic modality
- Epistemic logic
- Epistemology
- Free choice inference
- Hedge (linguistics)
- Dynamic semantics
