= Dutch grammar =

Grammar of the Dutch language

This article outlines the grammar of the Dutch language, which shares strong similarities with German grammar and also, to a lesser degree, with English grammar.

== Preliminary considerations ==
Vowel length is indicated in Dutch spelling using a combination of double vowels and double consonants. Changes from single to double letters are common when discussing Dutch grammar, but they are entirely predictable once one knows how the spelling rules work. That means that the spelling alternations do not form part of the grammar, and they are not discussed here. For more information, see Dutch orthography.

== Word order ==
Dutch word order is underlyingly SOV (subject–object–verb). There is an additional rule called V2 in main clauses, which moves the finite (inflected for subject) verb into the second position in the sentence. That makes sentences with only one verb appear with SVO (subject–verb–object) or VSO (verb–subject–object) order.

Jan	hielp	zijn moeder
Jan	helped	his mother
"Jan helped his mother."

Gisteren	hielp	Jan	zijn moeder
Yesterday	helped	Jan	his mother
"Yesterday, Jan helped his mother."

However, any other verbs or verbal particles are placed at the end of the clause in accordance with the underlying SOV order, giving an intermediate order of SVOV(V)(V)...

Jan	wilde	zijn moeder	gaan helpen
Jan	wanted	his mother	to go help
"Jan wanted to go (and) help his mother."

In subordinate clauses, the order is exclusively SOV. In subordinate clauses two word orders are possible for the verb clusters and are referred to as the "red": omdat ik heb gewerkt, "because I have worked": as in English, where the auxiliary verb precedes the past participle, and the "green": omdat ik gewerkt heb, where the past participle precedes the auxiliary verb, "because I worked have": as in German. In Dutch, the green word order is most used in speech, and the red is the most used in writing, particularly in journalistic texts, but the "green" is also used in writing. Unlike in English, however, adjectives and adverbs must precede the verb: dat het boek groen is, "that the book is green". For an explanation of verb clusters of three or more see: V2 word order

Jan	zei	dat	hij	zijn moeder	wilde	gaan helpen
Jan	said	that	he	his mother	wanted	to go help
"Jan said that he wanted to go help his mother."

In yes–no questions, the verb of the main clause is usually but not always placed, first instead of second. The verb coming second often implies disbelief like in English: "The prisoner escaped?" vs. "Did the prisoner escape?"

Hielp	Jan	zijn moeder?
Helped	Jan	his mother?
"Did Jan help his mother?"

Wilde	Jan	zijn moeder	gaan helpen?
Wanted	Jan	his mother	to go help?
"Did Jan want to go help his mother?"

Zei	Jan	dat	hij	zijn moeder	wilde	gaan helpen?
Said	Jan	that	he	his mother	wanted	to go help?
"Did Jan say that he wanted to go help his mother?"

In imperative sentences, the verb of the main clause is always placed first, although it may be preceded by a noun phrase indicating who is being addressed.

(Jan,)	ga	je moeder	helpen!
(Jan,)	go	your mother	help!
"(Jan,) go help your mother!"

(Jan,)	zeg	dat	je	je moeder	wilde	gaan helpen!
(Jan,)	say	that	you	your mother	wanted	to go help!
"(Jan,) say that you wanted to go help your mother!"

In the following example, the SOV order in the subordinate clause causes the various noun phrases to be separated from the verbs that introduce them, creating a relatively deep "nesting" structure:

Ik zie dat	de ouders	de kinderen	Jan	het huis	hebben	laten	helpen	schilderen.
I see that	the parents	the children	Jan	the house	have	let	help	paint
"I see that the parents have let the children help Jan paint the house."

Adjectives always come before the noun to which they belong.

rode appels – red apples

In contrast to English, adpositional phrases come in the order time–manner–place, again as in German, so that time modifiers usually come before place modifiers:

Ik	ben	dit	jaar	naar	Frankrijk	geweest
I	am	this	year	to	France	been
"I have been to France this year."

== Nouns ==
In Dutch, nouns are marked for number in singular and plural. Cases have largely fallen out of use, as have the endings that were used for them. Standard Dutch has three genders: masculine, feminine and neuter. However, in large parts of the Netherlands there is no grammatical distinction between what were originally masculine and feminine genders, and there is only a distinction between the resultant common and neuter. Gender is not overtly marked on nouns either, and must be learned for each noun.

=== Plural ===
The plural is formed by addition of -en (pronounced /ən/ or /ə/) or -s, with the usual spelling changes in the case of the former. Which of the two is used is somewhat unpredictable, although some general rules can be given:

- Single-syllable words, which are common in Dutch, normally use -en:
  - deur "door" → deuren
  - boot "boat" → boten
  - huis "house" → huizen
  - dief "thief" → dieven
- Words ending in a schwa /ə/ often use -s, but a sizable number use -n, particularly if they are older. Some nouns may allow either ending. Nouns that are substantivised forms of adjectives always use -n.
  - tante "aunt" → tantes
  - chocolade "chocolate" → chocolades
  - bode "messenger" → boden or bodes
  - oxide "oxide" → oxiden
  - grote "great one" → groten
- Relatively modern words ending in a long vowel use -'s (with an apostrophe), but if they end in -ee or -é then no apostrophe is used. Older ones generally use -en or -ën (with diaeresis).
  - baby "baby" → baby's
  - café "café, bar, pub" → cafés
  - pizza "pizza" → pizza's
  - radio "radio" → radio's
  - ree "roe" → reeën
  - la (also lade) "drawer" → laden (but in colloquial usage sometimes also la's)
- Words ending in unstressed -el or -er usually use -s. If -en is allowed it tends to be more archaic or poetic.
  - akker "agricultural field" → akkers
  - appel "apple" → appels or (archaic) appelen (note: for the derived noun aardappel "potato", the plural aardappelen is still common, alongside aardappels)
  - lepel "spoon" → lepels
  - sleutel "key" → sleutels
  - vader "father" → vaders or (archaic) vaderen
- Initialisms (words pronounced as letters) follow the rules for whatever the final syllable suggests, usually by adding -s but occasionally -en:
  - APK "vehicle inspection" → APK's
  - cd "CD" → cd's
  - sms "text message" → sms'en
  - BMX "BMX" → BMX'en

==== Plurals with vowel change ====
A number of common nouns inherited from Old Dutch have a short vowel in the singular but a long vowel in the plural. When short i is lengthened in that way, it becomes long e.

- dag /dɑx/ "day" → dagen /ˈdaːɣə(n)/ "days"
- gebrek /ɣəˈbrɛk/ "lack, deficiency" → gebreken /ɣəˈbreːkə(n)/ "deficiencies"
- schip /sxɪp/ "ship" → schepen /ˈsxeːpə(n)/ "ships"
- slot /slɔt/ "lock" → sloten /ˈsloːtə(n)/ "locks" (also the plural of sloot "ditch")

Other nouns with that change include bad "bath", bedrag "(money) contribution", bevel "command", blad "sheet of paper; magazine" (not "leaf"), (aan)bod "offer", dak "roof", dal "valley", gat "hole", gebed "prayer", gebod "commandment", gen "gene", glas "glass", god "god", hertog "duke", hof "court", hol "cave; burrow", lid "member", lot "lottery ticket", oorlog "war", pad "path", schot "shot", slag "strike, battle", smid "smith", spel "large game; spectacle" (not in the sense of a smaller everyday game), staf "staff", vat "vat, barrel", verbod "ban, prohibition", verdrag "treaty", verlof "permission", weg "road, way".

The noun stad /stɑt/ "town, city" has vowel alternation in the plural alongside lengthening: steden /ˈsteːdə(n)/ "towns, cities". The plural of nouns ending in the suffix -heid /ɦɛit/ "-ness, -hood" is irregular -heden /ɦeːdə(n)/.

==== Plurals in -eren ====
A few neuter nouns have a plural in -eren. The ending derives from the old Germanic "z-stem" nouns and is cognate with the English -ren (children, brethren, etc.). The following nouns have that type of plural:

- been "bone" → beenderen (when used in the sense "leg", the plural is the regular benen)
- blad "leaf" → bladeren (when used in the sense "sheet, magazine", the plural is bladen)
- ei "egg" → eieren
- gelid "rank, file" → gelederen
- gemoed "mood, emotion" → gemoederen
- goed "good" → goederen
- hoen "fowl" → hoenderen
- kalf "calf" → kalveren
- kind "child" → kinderen
- kleed "cloth" → (archaic) klederen or kleren "clothes" (nowadays a plurale tantum like in English)
- lam "lamb" → lammeren
- lied "song" → liederen (somewhat dated; the plural of the diminutive is often used instead: liedjes)
- rad "wheel" → raderen
- rund "cattle" → runderen
- volk "people, nation" → volkeren (the regular volken is also used)

When used in compounds, the stem of those nouns usually includes the -er: eierschaal "eggshell", kinderarbeid "child labour", klederdracht "traditional costume", rundertartaar "beef tartare". That is not a rule, however, and compounds with the singular form also exist: eivorm "egg-shape", rundvlees "beef".

==== Foreign plurals ====
For a number of nouns of Latin origin, a Latin-like plural may be used. Depending on the word and the formalness of the setting, a regular plural in -en or -s can also be used.

- museum "museum" → musea or museums
- politicus "politician" → politici

Some modern scientific words borrowed from Latin or Greek form their plurals with vowel lengthening like the native words listed above. Those words are primarily Latin agent nouns ending in -or and names of particles ending in -on. Alongside the change in vowel length, there is also a stress shift in the plural, patterned on the Latin third declension in which that also occurs. In each case, the singular follows a Latin-like stress, and the plural stresses the -on- or -or-. Some examples:

- elektron (/eːˈlɛktrɔn/ "electron") → elektronen (/eːlɛkˈtroːnə(n)/ "electrons")
- doctor (/ˈdɔktɔr/ "doctor (holder of a doctorate)") → doctoren (/dɔkˈtoːrə(n)/ "doctors")
- graviton (/ˈɣraːvitɔn/ "graviton") → gravitonen (/ɣraːviˈtoːnə(n)/ "gravitons")
- reactor (/reːˈɑktɔr/ "reactor") → reactoren (/reːɑkˈtoːrə(n)/ "reactors")

Words borrowed from English or French generally form their plural in -s, in imitation of the native plural of those languages. That applies especially to recent borrowings.

- harddisk → harddisks
- bonbon → bonbons

=== Diminutive ===
Many nouns have a diminutive form alongside the normal base form. The form indicates a small size or emphasises a particular endearing quality. The use of diminutives is so common that they could be considered part of the noun's inflectional paradigm.

There are two basic ways to form the diminutive: with -tje or with -ke(n). The former is the standard way, and the latter is found in some dialects, mostly in the South (Brabantian and Limburgish). The diminutive on -ke(n) is common in informal Belgian Dutch (because of final-n deletion in Dutch, the final -n is often not pronounced). All diminutives have neuter gender, whatever the gender of the original noun. The plural is always formed with -s.

==== Diminutive in -tje ====
The basic suffix -tje is modified in different ways depending on the final sounds of the noun it is attached to.

The -t- is removed from the ending when added to words ending in a fricative or plosive (-b, -c, -d, -f, -g, -ch, -k, -p, -q, -s, -sj, -t, -v, -x, -z).

- hond → hondje
- brief → briefje
- hok → hokje
- vis → visje
- douche → doucheje (/duʃ/ → /ˈduʃ(j)ə/)
- race → raceje (/reːs/ → /ˈreːsjə/ ~ /ˈreːʃə/)

The last two words end in a consonant sound, despite not being spelled that way.

When the vowel of the last syllable is both short and stressed and it is followed by a sonorant, an extra schwa -e- is inserted, giving -etje.

- kom → kommetje
- pil → pilletje
- lam → lammetje
- ding → dingetje
- vriendin → vriendinnetje
- baron → baronnetje

In all other cases, the basic form -tje is used, which includes:

- Words ending in a stressed tense/long vowel or diphthong.
- Words ending in any unstressed vowel.
- Words ending in one of the above types of vowel, followed by -l, -n, -r.
- Words ending in one of the above types of vowel, followed by -m. The resulting combination -mtje is assimilated to -mpje.
- Words ending in one of the above types of vowel, followed by -ng. The resulting combination -ngtje is assimilated to -nkje.

When the final vowel is long, it is doubled accordingly. Final -i, which does not really occur in native Dutch words, is converted into -ie. Final -y gets an apostrophe.

- koe → koetje
- auto → autootje
- mama → mamaatje
- vrouw → vrouwtje
- taxi → taxietje
- baby → baby'tje
- school → schooltje
- kuil → kuiltje
- maan → maantje
- muur → muurtje
- appel → appeltje
- boom → boompje
- duim → duimpje
- bodem → bodempje
- koning → koninkje
- houding → houdinkje

In the case of the vowels oe and ie, there is some ambiguity. While pronounced short in many dialects, they can also be long for some speakers, so forms both with and without the extra -e- can be found.

- bloem → bloemetje or bloempje (however bloemetje has an additional meaning: bouquet)
- wiel → wieltje or wieletje

==== Diminutive in -ke(n) ====
In the south, the ending -ke(n) is often used instead. It also has different forms depending on the preceding sounds, with rules very similar to those for the -tje ending.

An older form of the ending was -ken, which is more like its German cognate -chen. That form is not used much today because of final n-deletion, which is common in Dutch. However, the form it is still found in older texts and names. A famous example is Manneken Pis.

When the word ends in a velar consonant (-g, -ch, -k, -ng), an extra dissimilative -s- is inserted, giving -ske(n).

- dag → dagske
- lach → lachske
- stok → stokske
- ding → dingske
- koning → koningske

An extra -e- is inserted in three cases, giving -eke(n):

- Words ending in a non-velar plosive (-p, -b, -t, -d).
- Words ending in -n, which is not a velar itself but would assimilate to one before the following -k-.
- Words ending in -m, -l or -r preceded by a stressed short vowel.

Examples:

- hond → hondeke
- voet → voeteke
- map → mappeke
- boon → boneke
- bon → bonneke
- kom → kommeke
- hol → holleke
- bar → barreke

In all other cases, the ending is the basic -ke(n), which includes:

- Words ending in a vowel.
- Words ending in a non-velar fricative (-f, -v, -s, -z).
- Words ending in -m, -l, -r preceded by a long vowel, diphthong, or unstressed vowel.

Examples:

- mama → mamake
- koe → koeke
- slof → slofke
- doos → dooske
- school → schoolke
- muur → muurke
- boom → boomke
- bodem → bodemke

==== Vowel alternation in diminutives ====
Standard Dutch and most other dialects do not use vowel alternation (Germanic umlaut) as a grammatical marker. However, some eastern dialects (East Brabantian, Limburgish and many Low Saxon areas) have regular vowel alternation of the preceding vowel in diminutives. As that is not a standard feature, it is rare in the written language except to evoke a local feeling. It can be more common in the spoken language:

- man → menneke
- boom → beumke
- pop → pupke

==== Diminutives of nouns with irregular plurals ====
Nouns with irregular plurals tend to have the same irregularity in the diminutive as well. That is not a rule, however, and both forms can often be found. For some nouns, the irregularity is more common in the plural of the diminutive, and only rarely appears in the singular:

- blad "leaf; sheet of paper" → blaadje "small leaf; folio", in plural also bladertjes
- dag "day" → dagje "short day", in plural also daagjes
- glas "drinking glass" → glaasje "small glass"
- kind "child" → kindje "toddler", in plural also kindertjes
- pad "path" → paadje "narrow or short path" (vs. pad "toad" → padje "toadlet")
- rad "wheel" → radje or radertje "little wheel"
- schip "ship" → scheepje "little ship"
- spel "game" → speeltje "toy"
- vat "barrel" → vaatje "small barrel"

=== Cases ===
Noun cases were still prescribed in the formal written standard until the 1940s, when they were abolished because they had long disappeared from the spoken language. That has caused them to be restricted mostly to set phrases and to be archaic. The former Dutch case system resembled that of modern German, and distinguished four cases: nominative (subject), genitive (possession or relation), dative (indirect object, object of preposition) and accusative (direct object, object of preposition). Only the nominative and genitive are productive, and the genitive are seldom used and only surviving in the margins of Dutch. Some examples of the three non-nominative cases in fixed expressions:

- Genitive: de dag des oordeels "judgement day", Koninkrijk der Nederlanden "Kingdom of the Nederlands"
- Dative: in feite "in fact", heden ten dage "nowadays", bij dezen "hereby"
- Accusative: op den duur "eventually", goedenavond "good evening"

The role of cases has been taken over by prepositions and word order in modern Dutch. For example, the distinction between direct and indirect object is now made by placing the indirect object before the direct object, or by using the preposition aan "to" with the indirect object. The genitive is replaced with the preposition van "of". Usage of cases with prepositions has disappeared as well. The case of each noun is now interpreted mainly by word order. Nominatives go first, datives after, and lastly the accusatives. Nouns after prepositions are also accusative.

Cases are still occasionally used productively, which are often calques of existing phrases. That is particularly true of the genitive case, which is still used occasionally to evoke a formal style. Speakers' awareness of how the cases were originally used is generally low. People may confuse the old masculine/neuter genitive article des and the corresponding noun ending -s with the article der (with no ending) used for feminine or plural nouns.

== Articles ==
Dutch has both a definite article ("the") and an indefinite article ("a" or "an").

	Masculine	Feminine	Neuter
Definite singular	de man	de vrouw	het huis
Definite plural	de mannen	de vrouwen	de huizen
Indefinite singular	een man	een vrouw	een huis

Het and een are normally pronounced /ət/ and /ən/, only emphatically as /ɦɛt/ and /eːn/, respectively. They may sometimes also be contracted in spelling to reflect this: 't, 'n.

There is no indefinite article in the plural, the noun is just used on its own. However, there is a negative indefinite article geen ("no, not a, not any"). Similarly to een it is invariable, showing no inflection for gender or number.

- Dat is geen man ("That is not a man")
- Dat is geen vrouw ("That is not a woman")
- Dat is geen huis ("That is not a house")
- Dat zijn geen mannen ("Those aren't men")
- Ik heb geen water ("I have no water", "I don't have any water")

The articles formerly had forms for the different cases as well. See Archaic Dutch declension for more information.

== Adjectives and adverbs ==
Within the Dutch noun phrase, adjectives are placed in front of the noun and after the article (if present).

=== Inflection ===
The inflection of adjectives follows the gender and number of the following noun. They also inflect for definiteness, like in many other Germanic languages. When preceded by a definite article, demonstrative determiner, possessive determiner or any other kind of word that acts to distinguish one particular thing from another, the definite form of the adjective is used. In other cases, such as with an indefinite article, indefinite determiner (like veel "many" or alle "all"), the indefinite form is used.

Despite the many different aspects that determine the inflection of an adjective, the adjective only occurs in two main forms. The uninflected form or base form is the adjective without any endings. The inflected form has the ending -e. The inflection of adjectives is as follows:

	Masculine	Feminine	Neuter	Plural
Indefinite	een kleine man	een kleine vrouw	een klein huis	kleine mannen, vrouwen, huizen
Definite	de kleine man	de kleine vrouw	het kleine huis	de kleine mannen, vrouwen, huizen

Adjectives are only inflected in this way when they are in an attributive role, where they precede a noun and modify it. Adjectives in a predicative role, which are used in predicative sentences with a copula verb, are not inflected and always use the uninflected form. Compare:

- de kleine man ("the small man") — de man is klein ("the man is small")
- kleine huizen ("small houses") — huizen zijn klein ("houses are small")

Most adjectives ending in -en have no inflected form. This includes adjectives for materials, as well as the past participles of strong verbs.

- de houten stoel ("the wooden chair")
- het stenen huis ("the brick house")
- de gebroken lampen ("the broken lamps")

Adjectives that end in a vowel in their uninflected form are rare, and there are no fixed rules for them. Often, the uninflected and inflected forms are the same, but sometimes an extra -ë is added on anyway.

==== Additional uses of the uninflected form ====
Uninflected adjectives are occasionally found in other contexts. With neuter nouns, if the adjective is inherently part of the noun as part of a set phrase, then the uninflected form is often used in the definite singular as well:

- het openbaar vervoer ("the public transport", as a specific entity)
- het openbare vervoer ("the public transport", meaning the transport that is public, it could be any transport)
- het groot woordenboek van de Nederlandse taal ("the big dictionary of the Dutch language", as a proper title)
- het grote woordenboek van de Nederlandse taal ("the big dictionary of the Dutch language", a dictionary that happens to be big)
- het Burgerlijk Wetboek ("the civil code", as a proper name)

Indefinite adjectives describing people often remain uninflected, if they express a personal quality. This is not stylistically neutral, but has a formal, rhetorical or poetic ring to it, and can occasionally distinguish literal meanings of an adjective from a more figurative one. Furthermore, this is only done with some nouns, not all.

- een talentvol schrijver ("a talented writer") — een talentvolle schrijver (the same)
- een groot man ("a great man"; figurative meaning) — een grote man ("a big/tall man"; literal meaning) — een grote vrouw ("a great/big/tall woman"; -e is always used with vrouw)

=== Partitive ===
Adjectives have a special form called the partitive that is used after an indefinite pronoun such as iets 'something', niets 'nothing', veel 'much, a lot', weinig 'little, a few'. The partitive form takes the ending -s.

- Vertel me iets interessants. ("Tell me something interesting.")
- Ik heb iemand nieuws leren kennen. ("I've got to meet somebody new.")

Adjectives already ending in -s or -sch don't take this ending:

- Ik heb iets paars aangetrokken. ("I've put on something purple.") (the base form is already paars)
- Er is niet veel fantastisch aan. ("There isn't much fantastic about it.")

The few adjectives that end in a long vowel take instead -'s with an apostrophe like certain noun plurals.

- Ik vond paars niet zo mooi, dus heb ik nu iets lila's. ("I didn't like purple so much, so now I have something lilac.")

=== Adjectives used as adverbs ===
The uninflected form of an adjective is implicitly also an adverb. This makes it hard at times to distinguish adjectives and adverbs in Dutch.

- Dat is een snelle auto. De auto rijdt snel. ("That is a fast car. The car drives fast.")
- Wij werden vriendelijk begroet door die vriendelijke mensen. ("We were kindly welcomed by those kind people.")

=== Adjectives used as nouns ===
The inflected form of an adjective can also be used as a noun. Three types can be distinguished:

- The noun that the adjective refers to is omitted but implied. The adjective will then be inflected as if the noun had been present, although the inflected form is normally used even in the indefinite neuter singular.
  - Je kunt deze auto kopen in verschillende kleuren. Wil je de groene, de blauwe of de gele? ("You can buy this car in various colours. Do you want the green, the blue or the yellow one?")
  - Wij hebben drie kinderen, twee grote en een kleine. ("We have three children, two big ones and a small one.", alternatively Wij hebben drie kinderen, twee grote en een klein.)
- The adjective is used as a masculine/feminine noun in its own right, usually referring to a person. The -e will always be added, even to adjectives that already end in -en. The plural is formed with -n.
  - Je rijdt als een blinde! ("You drive like a blind person!")
  - Waar ben je, mijn geliefde? ("Where are you, my loved one?")
  - Laat de gevangene vrij! ("Release the prisoner!", from the past participle gevangen "captured, imprisoned")
  - De rijken moeten de armen helpen. ("The rich should help the poor.")
- The adjective is used as a neuter mass noun describing a concept.
  - Ik kan geen antwoord geven, omdat ik het gevraagde niet begrijp. ("I can't answer, because I don't understand what was asked.")
  - Angst voor het onbekende is heel gewoon. ("Fear of the unknown is very normal.")

=== Comparative and superlative ===
Adjectives have three degrees of comparison: positive, comparative, and superlative. The comparative and superlative are formed synthetically, by adding endings to the adjective. The comparative and superlative can also be formed analytically by using meer "more" and meest "most", but this is much rarer than in English. The analytic forms are used only when the word would become particularly long, or when it would become hard to pronounce (particularly in the superlative).

The comparative is formed by adding -er to the base form. For adjectives that end in -r, the comparative is formed by adding -der to the base form instead. The comparative inflects as an adjective in its own right, having inflected and partitive forms. The uninflected comparative can be used as an adverb as well.

- Ik ben groot, maar jij bent groter. ("I'm big, but you're bigger.")
- Dit speelgoed kan gevaarlijk zijn voor kleinere kinderen. ("This toy can be dangerous for smaller children.")
- Deze jas is duurder. ("This coat is more expensive.")
- Heb je niets goedkopers? ("Do you have nothing cheaper?")
- Dat heb je nog fantastischer gedaan dan de vorige keer! ("You did it even more fantastically than last time!")

The superlative is formed by adding -st. This is equivalent to adding -t to the partitive, and the same rules apply. When an adjective ends in -s or -sch, it becomes -st and -scht, but those forms are more rarely used, and the analytic form with meest is preferred.

- De Mont Blanc is de hoogste berg van de Alpen. ("Mont Blanc is the highest mountain of the Alps.")
- Dit is het vieste toilet dat ik ooit heb gezien. ("This is the dirtiest toilet I've ever seen.", alternatively Dit is het meest vieze toilet)

Because it is most often used to distinguish one particular thing from all others, the superlative is generally accompanied by a definite article. This means it is rarely found in the uninflected form. Even in predicative sentences, a definite article precedes, so it becomes more like a noun phrase with an implied noun.

- Deze jas is de duurste. ("This coat is the most expensive.")
- Dit huis is het grootste. ("This house is the biggest.")

When used as an adverb, the superlative is always preceded by the neuter article het, unlike in English where this is optional. Either the uninflected or the inflected form can be used, without any difference in meaning. This form can also be used as part of predicative sentences, which can lead to a mismatch of genders which may seem odd at first glance, but is correct nonetheless:

- Deze jas is het duurst(e). ("This coat is (the) most expensive")
- Dit huis is het grootst(e). ("This house is (the) biggest.")
- Onze auto rijdt het hardst(e) van allemaal. ("Our car drives (the) fastest of all.")

The first sentence meaning "This coat is the most expensive" has the same meaning as the first sentence further above. They are interchangeable, but they would be parsed differently. With the article de, there is an implied noun, and it might better be translated as "the most expensive one". The superlative must also be in the inflected form in this case, de duurst would be incorrect. With the article het, there is no implied noun, and both the inflected (het duurste) and uninflected form (het duurst) can be used.

Some comparatives and superlatives are irregular and suppletive. they use a different root from the base form.

- goed, beter, best 'good/well, better, best'
- veel, meer, meest 'much/many, more, most'
- weinig, minder, minst 'little/few, less/fewer, least/fewest'
- graag, liever, liefst 'willingly/gladly, rather/more preferably, most preferably'
- dikwijls, vaker, vaakst 'often, more often, most often'

When an adjective is a compound of an adverb and a verb participle, the adverb sometimes changes rather than the whole word. A space may be added as well.

- dichtbij, dichterbij, dichtstbij 'close/nearby, closer, closest'
- dichtbevolkt, dichter bevolkt, dichtstbevolkt 'densely populated, more densely populated, most densely populated'

== Pronouns and determiners ==
=== Personal pronouns ===
As in English, Dutch personal pronouns still retain a distinction in case: the nominative (subjective), genitive (≈ possessive) and accusative/dative (objective). A distinction was once prescribed between the accusative 3rd person plural pronoun hen and the dative hun, but it was artificial and both forms are in practice variants of the same word. Both cases are still sometimes taught to students and may be used in formal Dutch, but no distinction is made in the everyday spoken language.

Like many other European languages, Dutch has a T-V distinction in its personal pronouns. The second-person pronouns, which are used to refer to the listener, exist in informal and formal varieties. However, because of the relatively complex and dialect-specific way in which the pronouns developed, it is less straightforward than it is in for example French or German. The old Germanic/Indo-European second-person singular pronoun du / doe (English thou) fell out of use in Dutch during the Middle Ages, but it remained in use in the closely-related Limburgish and neighbouring Low German, West Frisian and German languages. The role of the old singular pronoun was taken over by the old plural form, which differed slightly depending on dialect: gij in the South, jij in the North. That development also happened in English, which once had a T-V distinction but then lost it when the old informal pronoun, thou, was lost. In Dutch, however, further changes occurred, and the North and the South developed differently:

- In the North and in the standard language, a new formal pronoun u was introduced, which made jij distinctly informal. A new second-person plural pronoun was created by adding lie(den) "people" to the old singular (compare English y'all). This created jullie, an informal pronoun when speaking to many people. The formal pronoun u is used for both singular and plural.
- In the South, the older situation remained in many dialects, and gij is then still a neutral way to speak to a person in those dialects. However, informal jij and formal u are commonly used in the standard language of the South, like in the North.
- Many dialects created their own plural forms of pronouns, such as gijlie or similar in the South for the second person plural, and also hullie for the third person plural ("they"), which later became a standard in Afrikaans. Those forms are not part of standard Dutch.

Many pronouns can occur in a stressed form and an unstressed (clitic) form. The stressed form retains the original full vowel and is used when particular emphasis or contrast is needed. The unstressed form normally replaces the vowel with a schwa /ə/ and is used in other cases. The unstressed forms are shown in brackets; those spelled with an apostrophe or hyphen are not used often in formal written text and are used mainly in informal speech.

person	subject	object
1st person singular	ik ('k)	mij (me)
2nd person singular, informal	jij (je)	jou (je)
2nd person singular, formal	u	u
2nd person singular, Southern	gij (ge)	u
3rd person singular, masculine	hij (-ie)	hem ('m)
3rd person singular, feminine	zij (ze)	haar ('r, d'r)
3rd person singular, neuter	het ('t)	het ('t)
1st person plural	wij (we)	ons
2nd person plural, informal	jullie (je)	jullie (je)
2nd person plural, formal	u	u
2nd person plural, Southern	gij (ge)	u
3rd person plural, for a person	zij (ze)	hun, hen (ze)
3rd person plural, for an object	zij (ze)	die (ze)

In addition to hij, zij, and het having unstressed counterparts, they are themselves in a technical way unstressed forms of the demonstrative pronouns; het is an unstressed form of dat, and the others are forms of die. It is formal and normal to replace those personal pronouns with demonstrative pronouns.

- Die houdt van melk. (He/she likes milk.)
- Dat is zeer snel. (It is very fast.)

The pronouns are the only place in the standard language where the difference between masculine and feminine gender is significant. Consequently, the usage of the pronouns differs depending on how many genders are distinguished by a speaker. Speakers in the North will use feminine pronouns for female people, and the masculine pronouns for male people and for common-gender (masculine or feminine) nouns. In the South, the feminine pronouns are used for feminine nouns and the masculine pronouns are used for masculine nouns. See Gender in Dutch grammar for more details.

The standard language prescribes that in the third person plural, hen is accusative and is to be used for the direct object, and hun is dative, and is for the indirect object. This distinction was artificially introduced in the 17th century, and is largely ignored in spoken language and not well understood by Dutch speakers. Consequently, the third person plural forms hun and hen are interchangeable in normal usage, with hun being more common. The shared unstressed form ze is also often used as both direct and indirect objects and is a useful avoidance strategy when people are unsure which form to use.

In the West and among younger speakers, in informal spoken language, hun is also used as a subject pronoun by some. This is considered heavily stigmatised and substandard.

=== Possessive determiners ===
Possessive determiners also have stressed and unstressed forms, like the pronouns.

person	uninflected	inflected
1st person singular	mijn (m'n)	mijne
2nd person singular, informal	jouw (je)	jouwe
2nd person singular, formal	uw	uwe
2nd person singular, southern	uw	uwe
3rd person singular, masculine	zijn (z'n)	zijne
3rd person singular, feminine	haar ('r, d'r)	hare
3rd person singular, neuter	zijn (z'n)	zijne
1st person plural	ons	onze
2nd person plural, informal	jullie (je)	—
2nd person plural, formal	uw	uwe
2nd person plural, southern	uw	uwe
3rd person plural	hun	hunne

Possessive determiners are not inflected when used attributively, unlike adjectives. Thus:

- Hij is mijn man. ("He is my husband.")
- Dat is mijn huis. ("That is my house.")

An exception is ons, which inflects like an indefinite adjective, receiving -e when used with a masculine, feminine or plural noun. Possessive determiners are themselves definite in meaning, so any following adjectives will occur in the definite form even when the possessive itself does not:

- ons grote huis ("our big house")
- onze grote huizen ("our big houses").

The inflected form is also used when the determiner is used predicatively. It is always preceded by a definite article in this case, giving the appearance of an implied noun. For example: Dit is mijn auto. De auto is de mijne. ("This is my car. The car is mine.", more literally "The car is the my one"). Jullie has no inflected form, the sentence is usually rephrased with van instead: De auto is van jullie. ("The car is of you.")

Before the case system was abolished from written Dutch, and in southern spoken language, all possessive determiners inflect(ed) as indefinite adjectives, not only ons. They also used to inflect for case. While this is no longer done in modern Dutch, some relics still remain in fixed expressions. See Archaic Dutch declension for more details.

=== Demonstrative determiners ===
Like English, Dutch has two sets of demonstrative for different degrees of distance. A third, unspecific degree also exists, which is fulfilled by the personal pronouns, but see further below on pronominal adverbs.

The demonstratives inflect like indefinite adjectives, but irregularly. They are themselves definite in meaning, so any following adjectives will occur in the definite form.

Proximal demonstrative
	Masculine	Feminine	Neuter
Singular	deze	deze	dit
Plural	deze	deze	deze

Distal demonstrative
	Masculine	Feminine	Neuter
Singular	die	die	dat
Plural	die	die	die

When the demonstrative pronoun is used exophorically (referring to something that has not yet been mentioned in the text) with a copula verb, the "uninflected" forms dit and dat are always used:

- Dit is mijn nieuwe auto. Ik heb deze gisteren gekocht. ("This is my new car. I bought this one yesterday.")

Even though auto is of common gender and otherwise requires the form deze. In this sentence, the first pronoun (dit) is exophoric, while the second one (deze) refers back to auto.

The exophoric pronoun, when used in a predicative sentence, is always the complement and never the subject. The inflection of the verb follows the other argument instead, and will be plural even when the pronoun is not:

- Dat is een nieuw huis. ("That is a new house")
- Dit is mijn vader. ("This is my father")
- Dat zijn nieuwe huizen. ("Those are new houses", notice singular dat, with plural verb zijn agreeing with plural noun huizen)
- Dit zijn mijn kinderen. ("These are my children", same with dit)

=== Pronominal adverbs ===
A pronominal adverb is a location adverb that corresponds in meaning to a pronoun, and takes its place. They exist in English as well but are formal or outdated; examples are thereby ("by that"), herewith ("with this") and whereupon ("upon what" or "upon which").

Pronominal adverbs are used to replace the combination of prepositions with pronouns. They are very common in Dutch, and in some cases mandatory. The following table shows the pronouns that have adverbial forms:

Type	Pronoun	Adverb	Meaning
personal	hem, haar, het, hun/hen/ze	er	him, her, it, them, there (unspecific)
proximal demonstrative	dit	hier	this, here
distal demonstrative	dat	daar	that, there
interrogative or relative	wat, welk, welke	waar	what, which, where
universal	alles	overal	everything, everywhere
indefinite	iets	ergens	something, somewhere
negative	niets	nergens	nothing, nowhere

Both the combination of preposition+pronoun and the pronominal adverb can often be used, although the adverbial form is more common. The pronoun is used mainly when one needs to be specific about it. The neuter pronoun het can never appear as the object of a preposition; the adverbial form is mandatory. Combinations of a preposition and a relative pronoun are also usually replaced by a pronominal adverb. For example, the combination met dewelke (with which) is distinctly dated and usually replaced by waarmee. The masculine and feminine pronouns are used more often in the pronoun form, particularly when referring to persons, but the adverbial form may be used occasionally as well.

Pronominal adverbs are formed by replacing the pronoun by its corresponding locative adverb and the preposition by its adverbial form and putting them in reverse order. The locative adverbs overal, ergens and nergens are separated from the prepositional part by a space, while the other four are joined to it. For example:

- Ik reken op je steun. ("I'm counting on your support.")
- Ik reken erop. ("I'm counting on it.")
- Ik reken nergens op. ("I'm counting on nothing.", more freely "I'm not counting on anything.")

For most prepositions the adverbial form is identical with the preposition itself, but there are two exceptions:

- met "with" → mee
  - Hij stemt met alle voorstellen in. ("He agrees with all proposals.")
  - Hij stemt ermee in. ("He agrees with it.")
  - Hij stemt overal mee in. ("He agrees with everything.")
- tot "(up) to" → toe
  - Ik kan me niet brengen tot deze wandaden. ("I can't bring myself to (commit) these atrocities.")
  - Ik kan me hiertoe niet brengen. ("I can't bring myself to this.")

There are prepositions like sinds, via, vanwege that do not possess an adverbial form, which makes it difficult to use them in a relative construction, because the relative pronouns like dewelke, hetwelk are becoming obsolete.

Conversely, there are a number of prepositional adverbs like heen or af that cannot be used as prepositions, but they occur regularly as part of a pronominal adverb or of a separable verb.

The adverbial pronoun and the prepositional adverb can be separated from each other, with the prepositional part placed at the end of the clause. This is not always required, however, and some situations allow them to remain together.

- Daar reken ik op. ("That, I am counting on."), they can be combined too: Daarop reken ik. or Ik reken daarop.
- Ik reken er niet op. ("I am not counting on it."), here they must be separated.

Notice that in Dutch the last word op is generally analyzed as an adverb, not a preposition. Thus, the often quoted 'rule' that a sentence should not end in a preposition is strictly adhered to.

== Verbs ==
Dutch verbs inflect for person and number, and for two tenses and three moods. However, there is considerable syncretism among the forms. In modern usage only the present singular indicative has different forms for different persons, all other number, tense and mood combinations have just one form for all persons.

Dutch verbs inflect in two main tenses:

- The present tense is used to indicate present or future time, and may therefore be considered a "non-past" tense. It can express actions that are punctual, progressive or habitual.
- The past tense is used to indicate past time. The actions can be progressive or habitual at the time being discussed, as well as punctual in a sequence of retold events. It is not used to indicate completed punctual events that have relevance for the present; instead the (periphrastic) present perfect is used in this role. Contrast Dutch ik heb gisteren mijn vriend ontmoet with English I met my friend yesterday — the time being discussed is past, but it is considered relevant in the present moment.

Verbs also inflect for the following moods:

- The indicative mood is the default mood of Dutch and is used for general statements.
- The subjunctive mood is used for statements that are perceived as hypothetical or desired. Due to syncretism it is only clearly distinguished from the indicative in the present singular. It is only slightly productive in modern Dutch, and is mainly restricted to formulaic phrases otherwise, such as leve de koning "long live the king" or mogen zij in vrede rusten "may they rest in peace". Usually, it is replaced by the indicative or by a periphrastic conditional phrase.
- The imperative mood is used for commands. It exists only for the second person; imperatives for other persons are expressed periphrastically (laten we... "let's..."). Only one form is used for both the singular and plural imperative in modern Dutch. The older separate plural imperative form has fallen out of use and is now archaic or overly formal in tone.

Other grammatical categories such as future tense, passive voice, progressive or perfect aspect may be expressed periphrastically. Verbs additionally have an infinitive and two participles (present and past).

=== Conjugation ===
Dutch conjugation resembles that of other continental West Germanic languages such as (Standard) German and Low German, and also the other Germanic languages to a lesser degree. Dutch retains the two main types of verb inherited from Proto-Germanic: weak and strong. Preterite-present verbs are also present, but can be considered irregular. All regular verbs conjugate the same in the present tense (including the infinitive and present participle), so the weak versus strong distinction only matters for the past tense.

The following is a general overview of the endings:

Infinitive	-en		
Indicative mood
	Present	Weak past	Strong past
1st sing.	–	-de, -te	–
2nd sing. jij	-(t)	-de, -te	–
2nd sg+pl gij	-t	-de(t), -te(t)	-t
2nd sg+pl u	-t	-de, -te	–
3rd sing.	-t	-de, -te	–
Plural	-en	-den, -ten	-en
Subjunctive mood
	Present	Weak past	Strong past
Singular	-e	-de, -te	-e
Plural	-en	-den, -ten	-en
Imperative mood
General	–		
Plural	-t		
Participles
	Present	Weak past	Strong past
	-end	ge- -d, ge- -t	ge- -en

Weak verbs are the most common type of verb in Dutch, and the only productive type (all newly created verbs are weak). They form their past tense with an ending containing a dental consonant, -d- or -t-. Which of the two is used depends on the final consonant of the verb stem. If the stem ends in a voiceless consonant, then -t- is used, otherwise -d-. It is often summarised with the mnemonic "'t kofschip": if the verb stem ends with one of the consonants of 't kofschip (t, k, f, s, ch, p), then the past tense will have -t-. However, it also applies for c, q and x and any other letter that is voiceless in pronunciation.

- werken, werkte ("to work, worked")
- leren, leerde ("to learn/teach, learned/taught")
- razen, raasde ("to rage, raged")
- lossen, loste ("to lose/get rid of, lost")

Strong verbs are less common in Dutch, but they include many of the most common verbs. They form their past tenses by changing the vowel of the stem (ablaut). For strong verbs one needs to learn three or four principal parts: the infinitive, the past (singular), optionally the past plural, and the past participle. However, the vowel patterns are often predictable and can be divided into seven or so classes, based on the vowels used in those three principal parts. Some verbs are a mixture of two classes.

Examples:

- rijden, reed, gereden ("ride, rode, ridden", class 1)
- binden, bond, gebonden ("bind, bound, bound", class 3a)
- geven, gaf, gegeven ("give, gave, given", class 5)
- lopen, liep, gelopen ("walk/run, walked, walked", class 7b)

A number of verbs mix the strong and weak types of past. They have a strong past participle but all the other past tense forms are weak, or the other way around.

- lachen, lachte, gelachen ("laugh, laughed, laughed", weak past, strong past participle)
- zouten, zoutte, gezouten ("salt, salted, salted", weak past, strong past participle)
- vragen, vroeg, gevraagd ("ask, asked, asked", strong past, weak past participle)

Some of the most common verbs in the Dutch language have irregular conjugations, which do not follow the normal rules. That is especially the case for preterite-present verbs. Those verbs historically had present tense forms that resembled the past tenses of strong verbs, and can be recognised in modern Dutch by the absence of the -t in the third-person singular present (the English equivalents lack the -s in the same way). Preterite-present verbs have weak past tenses, but often irregularly formed. Many such verbs are now used as auxiliary verbs.

The additional -t of the second-person gij form is optional in the past tense for weak verbs and is usually considered archaic. For strong verbs, the -t is always required.

==== Modal verbs ====
Like English, Dutch uses modal verbs, such as kunnen ("can"), mogen ("may"), zullen ("shall/will"), moeten ("must"), and willen ("want"). Those verbs act irregularly and in conjunction with infinitives. Modal verbs are among the few verbs that have irregular conjugation in the present tense.

A special feature of Dutch modal verbs that does not exist in English is that speakers tend to omit the infinitive verb gaan ("go"), komen ("come"), and similar verbs if a modal verb is finite and there is a preposition.

- Ik wil niet naar school. ("I do not want to go to school.")
- Hij wil met een auto. ("He wants to come by car.")

=== Non-finite forms ===
Dutch possesses present and past participles.

==== Present participle ====
The present participle is always progressive in meaning, and indicates that something is performing the action as the subject. It is usually used as an attributive adjective, and inflects as such as well.

- Ik heb een vallende ster gezien. ("I saw a falling star.")
- Blaffende honden bijten niet. ("Barking dogs don't bite.")
- Het nieuws verspreidt zich als een lopend vuurtje. ("The news spreads like wildfire." — literally "like a running fire")

It can also be used as an adverb, meaning "while ...ing". Either the uninflected or inflected form can be used, although the uninflected form is more common outside set phrases.

- Al doende leert men. ("One learns while doing.")
- Dit werk is zo makkelijk, ik word slapend rijk. ("This work is so easy, I'm getting rich while sleeping.")
- Huilend vertelde de jongen wat er die dag gebeurd was. ("Crying, the boy told what had happened that day.")

Rarely, the present participle is used as a predicate, to indicate progressive actions as in English, such as De bal was rollende. ("The ball was rolling."). This is usually associated with a stilted or overly formal style. It is more usual to use aan het plus the infinitive.

The present participle of a transitive verb can be preceded by an object or an adverb. Often, the space between the two words is replaced with a hyphen or removed altogether, creating a compound adjective.

- Ik zat vast in langzaam rijdend verkeer. ("I was stuck in slow-moving traffic.")
- Het hondje slaakte een hartverscheurende kreet. ("The little dog let out a heart-rending cry.")
- Stenengooiende jongeren zijn een steeds ernstiger probleem. ("Rock-throwing youths are an increasingly severe problem.")

==== Past participle ====
The past participle indicates completed actions. It is also used to form the perfect and the passive voice with a variety of auxiliary verbs. Their formation is discussed in the section on "periphrastic forms".

As an adjective, the meaning of the past participle can be either active (having performed the action) or passive (having undergone the action), depending on the type of verb:

- For transitive verbs, the meaning is passive. Examples:
  - De gemaakte keuze bleek niet zo geweldig. ("The made choice (the choice that had been made) turned out to be not so great.")
  - Gebroken glas is gevaarlijk. ("Broken glass is dangerous.")
- For unaccusative intransitive verbs, the meaning is active. Examples:
  - De gevallen man kon niet meer opstaan. ("The fallen man could not get back up again.")
  - Iedereen ging op zoek naar het verdwenen hondje. ("Everyone went looking for the dog that had disappeared.")
- For unergative intransitive verbs, the past participle cannot be used as an adjective at all. Such participles can not be used with a copula such as zijn ("to be") either but only to form the perfect.

Like present participles, past participles can be preceded by an adverb.

- Haastig gemaakte keuzes leiden later vaak tot problemen. ("Hastily-made choices often lead to problems later.")
- Ik heb het liefst versgemaakt sinaasappelsap. ("I prefer freshly-made orange juice.")
- Jong geleerd is oud gedaan. ("Learned young is done old.", a proverb)

==== Infinitive ====
===== Verb phrases =====
The infinitive can be used in larger verb phrases with an auxiliary verb or modal verb, much as in English. Like present participles, the infinitive can be accompanied by an object or adverb.

- Ik kan de auto zien. ("I can see the car")

===== Verbal noun =====
The infinitive also doubles as a verbal noun, corresponding to the English gerund in -ing. The infinitive, when used as a noun, is neuter and has no plural. Dutch also has a feminine gerund in -ing, but it is no longer productive and usually has a concrete, technical meaning: het lenen 'borrowing, lending' vs. de lening 'loan'; het opleiden 'educating' vs. opleiding 'education'.

- Het doden van mensen is verboden. – 'The killing of people is forbidden', or less literally 'Killing people is forbidden'.
- Ik heb een hekel aan wachten. – 'I hate waiting.'

In the past, the infinitive was inflected for the dative and genitive. There are a few remnants of the latter:

- Tot ziens! – 'See you!'
- Een uur gaans. – 'A distance that can be walked in one hour.'

It also occurs in expressions involving tot ... toe (until ... resulted):

- Hij werd tot bloedens toe geslagen. – 'He was beaten until bleeding resulted.'

===== Impersonal imperative =====
The infinitive is also commonly used as a kind of impersonal or polite imperative (infinitivus pro imperativo). That often has a meaning much like the English “one must (not)…” or “please do (not)…” and can be used to soften a direct command into more of a strong request or to make the command more general (such as on signs and in written instructions), rather than being directed at the listener or reader at that specific moment in time. The distinction is not always clear, and both the infinitive and the imperative may often be used without a strong difference in meaning.

- Niet roken 'No smoking' (or less literally 'please refrain from smoking'), versus rook niet 'don't smoke!'.
- Hier betalen 'Pay here', alternatively betaal hier.
- Schudden voor gebruik 'Shake before use'.

===== With te =====
The infinitive is often preceded by the preposition te, analogous to the phrase to + verb in English. It is used in combination with certain verbs like beginnen 'to begin'.

- Hij begon te hoesten ("He started to cough")

In combination with zijn 'to be' it can express a potentiality.

- Dat was te verwachten ("That was to be expected").

The extended form can be used as an adjective:

- De te verwachten menigte ("The crowd that is to be expected")

But it can still carry adverbial expressions or objects:

- De in dat geval te verwachten menigte ("The crowd that is be expected in that case").

Compound infinitives also exist for the perfect and the future, as well as for the passive voice of transitive verbs, and they can be used to form abridged dependent clauses.

- Hij beloofde dat te zullen betalen. ("He promised that he would pay that")

=== Transitivity ===
Depending on their meaning and use, Dutch verbs belong to one of a handful of transitivity classes:

- Unergative intransitive verbs do not take a grammatical object and have active meaning (the subject is the agent). The perfect is formed with the auxiliary hebben. They have an impersonal passive voice.
- Unaccusative intransitive verbs do not take a grammatical object and have passive or middle meaning (the subject is the patient or there is no clear agent). The perfect is formed with the auxiliary zijn.
- Transitive verbs take a grammatical object. The subject is the agent, and the object is either direct (patient) or indirect. The passive voice is formed with the auxiliary worden. The perfect is formed with the auxiliary hebben when the direct object becomes subject, and with the auxiliary krijgen when the indirect object becomes subject. The perfect passive is formed with zijn.
- Ditransitive verbs take two grammatical objects, a direct object (patient) and an indirect object. These act like transitive verbs in most respects.
- Middle verbs, also called verbs of innocence, are essentially transitive unaccusative verbs, and take a grammatical object. The perfect is formed with the auxiliary zijn, while the passive is formed with worden and the perfect passive also with zijn. The use of the perfect auxiliary zijn carries an implication that the subject is not the direct initiator of the action or cannot or does not want to be held responsible for it. That includes verbs such as vergeten "to forget" and verliezen "to lose (an object)".
- Reflexive verbs are accompanied by a reflexive pronoun as object
- Impersonal verbs take only an indefinite pronoun het (it) as subject
- Absolute verbs are similar to unergatives, but they lack an impersonal passive form

Verbs can belong to several classes at once, depending on use. Specifically, many transitive verbs can also be used intransitively, and are thus ambitransitive. For example, ik eet een appel "I eat an apple" contains a transitive verb, while ik eet "I eat" contains an unergative intransitive verb. Most ditransitive verbs can also be used as monotransitive verbs (with only one object, direct or indirect) or even as intransitives.

Whether an intransitive use is unergative or unaccusative depends both on the verb and on the meaning in which it is used. Generally, most transitive verbs become unergatives when the object is removed, and they are accusative verbs. However, there are also a sizable number of so-called ergative verbs, which become unaccusative when there is no object. Such verbs thus switch from active to either passive or middle meaning when the object is dropped. Examples exist in both Dutch and English, such as the transitive ik breek het glas "I break the glass" and the unaccusative het glas breekt "the glass breaks". In both cases, the glass is the patient; in the first case, it is the direct object, but in the second, it is the subject. The auxiliary zijn of such verbs is used for both passive and intransitive use, which makes both uses essentially indistinguishable. The phrase het glas is gebroken can be interpreted as both "the glass has been broken" and "the glass is broken".

Alongside the normal conjugated verb forms, Dutch has a variety of verbal meanings that are expressed using auxiliary verbs or other additional words. The use of auxiliary verbs, particularly of the perfect tenses and the passive voice, if extant, depends on a verb's transitivity.

==== Perfect, future and passive ====
The perfect indicates that an action is complete. In Dutch the completion can take place in present, past, present future or past future:

- Ik heb gegeten 'I ate', literally 'I have eaten' – present perfect (with simple past meaning)
- Ik had gegeten 'I had eaten' or 'I had been eating' – past perfect (with pluperfect meaning)
- Ik zal gegeten hebben 'I shall have eaten' – future perfect
- Ik zou gegeten hebben 'I would have eaten' – past conditional (either as future-in-the-past or conditional mood)

The future tenses all take the auxiliary verb zullen, cognate with English shall. The passive voice indicates that the subject undergoes the action rather than performing it itself. Both categories are formed with a variety of auxiliary verbs.

Verb type	Present	Perfect	Passive	Perfect passive
accusative transitive openen 'to open'	Ik open de doos. 'I am opening the box'.	hebben Ik heb de doos geopend. 'I opened the box.'	worden De doos wordt geopend. 'The box is (being) opened.'	zijn De doos is geopend. 'The box has been opened.'
ergative transitive breken 'to break'	Ik breek het glas. 'I am breaking the glass' Het glas breekt. 'The glass is breaking / breaks.'	hebben Ik heb het glas gebroken. 'I broke the glass.'	worden Het glas wordt gebroken. 'The glass is (being) broken.'	zijn Het glas is gebroken. 'The glass has (been) broken.'
unergative intransitive blaffen 'to bark'	De hond blaft. 'The dog is barking.'	hebben De hond heeft geblaft. 'The dog barked.'	worden Er wordt geblaft (door de hond). ≈ 'Barking can be heard.'	zijn Er is geblaft (door de hond). ≈ 'Barking was heard.'
unaccusative intransitive vallen 'to fall'	De boom valt. 'The tree is falling'.	zijn De boom is gevallen. 'The tree fell.'	—	—

As can be seen in the table, in the case of unaccusative verbs, the auxiliary hebben cannot be used for the perfect, unlike in English. Generally, they are verbs that describe a process (such as to happen, melt, or die) rather than an action. That means that there is no (clear) actor involved.

As in English, ergative verbs can occur both in a transitive (I break the glass) and in an unaccusative mode (the glass breaks). In Dutch the perfect of the latter takes zijn 'to be', so that het glas is gebroken can either be seen as a perfect passive or as a perfect unaccusative. Dutch differs from German in that the latter language would add the participle worden to the passive sentence: Das Glas ist gebrochen worden.

Unergatives generally have passive forms, but they are impersonal. They typically take the adverb er as a dummy subject and are hard to translate directly into English. Er wordt geblaft means something like 'There's barking going on' or 'There's some dog barking'. Impersonal constructions of that kind are quite common in the language. The passives of transitive verbs can also be given an impersonal flavor by adding the dummy adverb er, provided the subject is indefinite: Er worden dozen geopend 'There are boxes being opened' or 'Boxes are being opened'.

Verbs of motion like lopen 'to walk', zwemmen 'to swim', rijden 'to ride, drive' typically occur as unaccusative / unergative pairs. If the motion is directional it is seen as a process and the auxiliary is zijn. If the motion is not directional it is seen as an action and the auxiliary verb is hebben, unless the verb is used in the impersonal passive in which case it can take worden and zijn.

directional

- Ik loop naar huis – 'I am walking home'
- Ik ben naar huis gelopen – 'I walked home'

non-directional

- Ik loop veel – 'I walk a lot'
- Ik heb veel gelopen – 'I walked a lot'
- Er wordt veel gelopen – 'There is a lot of walking going on'

Note also that the meanings of the formations that use zijn correspond to the meaning of the past participle when used as an adjective. Thus, unergative verbs can never use zijn as the auxiliary as their past participles cannot be used as adjectives. Furthermore, for ergative verbs, the passive does not differ significantly in meaning from the regular intransitive present tense. That is also true of English: a glass that breaks is a glass that is (being) broken.

The forms listed above can occur in both present and past tense. The table lists the present tense forms, and the past tense is formed by conjugating the auxiliary verb in the past tense, which creates Ik had de doos geopend. 'I had opened the box.' and so on.

When the perfect is created from a phrase that already uses an auxiliary verb, the auxiliary gets used in the infinitive form, rather than the past participle. That even causes some auxiliary verbs to have no past participle:

- Ik zal morgen komen. 'I will come tomorrow.' → Ik had morgen zullen komen. 'I had been going to come tomorrow.'
- Hij moet de deur sluiten. 'He has to close the door.' → Hij heeft de deur moeten sluiten. 'He has had to close the door.'

===== Ditransitive verbs =====
Ditransitive verbs carry both a direct and an indirect object. In English both objects can become the subject of a passive construction and the same auxiliary is used to form it:

- I give the man a book
- The man is given a book by me
- A book is given to the man by me.

In Dutch a verb like schenken (to donate) follows a similar pattern but the auxiliary krijgen (to get) is used for the pseudo-passive construction that renders the indirect object into the subject, whereas worden is used for passive involving the direct object:

- Ik schenk de man een boek
- De man krijgt van mij een boek geschonken
- Een boek wordt door mij aan de man geschonken.

The following three groups of verbs only take the auxiliary hebben in the perfect tenses.

===== Impersonal verbs =====
Impersonal verbs have no true subject but use a dummy subject pronoun het ("it"). Such verbs often refer to conditions such as the weather:

- Het regent. ("It rains." or "It is raining.")
- Het onweert. ("A thunderstorm is happening.")

===== Reflexive verbs =====
Reflexive verbs take a reflexive pronoun like me, je or zich as their (dummy) direct object and take hebben in the perfect. That contrasts with languages like French in which être (to be) is used as perfect auxiliary.

- Ik vergiste me (I mistook, made an error)
- Ik heb me vergist

Some of them occur in pairs with a transitive form and replace the unaccusative component of an ergative.

- Ratten verspreiden de ziekte – -(Rats spread the disease)
- De ziekte verspreidt zich – (The disease is spreading)

There are no verbs that only occur in a reciprocal form, but those that can take the reciprocal pronoun elkaar (each other) also take hebben in the perfect and thus behavie like reflexive ones.

- Massa's trekken elkaar aan. – (Masses attract each other.)
- De magneten hadden elkaar aangetrokken – (The magnets had attracted each other).

===== Absolute verbs =====
These verbs resemble the unergative ones except that they have no impersonal passive.

- De zon schijnt – (The sun shines)
- *Er wordt geschenen <- does not exist ->

Some of them may carry a direct object but they have neither a personal nor an impersonal passive:

- Een jas aanhebben – (To wear a coat)
- *Een jas wordt aangehad <- does not exist ->

Similarly, the past participle cannot be used as an adjective:

- *De aangehadde jas <- does not exist ->

==== Future ====
Although the present tense can be used to indicate future events, there is also a more explicit future tense in Dutch. It is formed using the auxiliary zullen ("will, shall, be going to"), which can be conjugated in both present and past tense. The "past future" carries a sense having pledged or promised to do something, or having been expected to do it, much as "was/were going to" does in English.

- Ik zal het morgen doen. ("I will do it tomorrow." or "I am going to do it tomorrow.")
- Je zou gisteren de ramen schoonmaken! ("You were going to clean the windows yesterday!")

An alternative future tense is formed using gaan ("to go") as the auxiliary. It is used in its literal meaning to indicate that one is moving to a place to perform an action, or is intending to do so ("be going to go"). More generally, it can indicate any kind of intention or plan to perform the action. It can also imply the start of an action in the future.

- Ik ga morgen met mijn vriendinnen winkelen. ("I'm going to go shopping with my friends tomorrow.")
- Voor vandaag is het werk klaar; morgen gaan ze verder werken. ("For today the work is done; tomorrow they're going to continue working.")
- Het gaat zo hard regenen. ("It's going to start raining hard in a moment.")

==== Conditional ====
The conditional mood is formed using the past tense of zullen, which is zou in the singular and zouden in the plural. It is therefore somewhat analogous to the use of would in English, as the past tense of the future auxiliary will. The conditional is identical in form to the "past future" described above, but is always accompanied by some kind of condition that the verb depends on, usually introduced with conjunctions like als ("if").

- Ik zou dat niet doen als ik jou was. ("I would not do that if I were you.")
- Hij zou de ramen niet hebben schoongemaakt, als ze niet vies waren. ("He would not have cleaned the windows, if they were not dirty.")

Note that Dutch does not have the strict rule "preterite in subclause, conditional in main clause" found in English. While such usage is most common, the reverse is also possible as is using the conditional or preterite in both clauses.

==== Progressive ====
The progressive aspect indicates that an action is ongoing and in progress. It is formed using zijn + aan het + infinitive of action verb. It is equivalent to the English 'be ...-ing' or 'be in the middle of ...-ing', but is not used as often.

- Je zult even moeten wachten, ik ben nu aan het eten. 'You'll have to wait (a while), I am eating now.'
- Hij was de ramen aan het schoonmaken toen de telefoon ging. 'He was cleaning the windows when the phone rang.'

Unlike in English, the progressive cannot be combined with the perfect to make a hypothetical "perfect progressive". Both "I have been eating" and "I had been eating" are expressed using the simple past tense form of the progressive: Ik was aan het eten.

A similar expression is bezig + zijn te + infinitive of action verb or bezig zijn met + action noun.

- Hij is bezig de klok te repareren. 'He's (busy) repairing the clock'.
  - Or: Hij is bezig met de reparatie van de klok. 'Idem'.
- Je bent de hele dag bezig met dat kind te helpen. 'You're spending the whole day helping that child.' (notice the superfluous met which is colloquial).

A different way to render progressive aspect is to use the (static) verbs zitten 'to sit', lopen 'to walk', staan 'to stand' and liggen 'to lie' with te + infinitive. Those verbs, when in the perfect, all use a double infinitive.

- Ik zit te eten. – 'I'm sat down eating' (UK) or 'I'm sitting here eating' (North America).
- Ik sta de ramen schoon te maken. – 'I'm stood (here) cleaning windows' (UK) or 'I'm standing here cleaning windows' (North America).
- Jantje ligt te slapen. – 'Jantje is sleeping'.

The literal meaning of the verbs to sit or to stand etc. is often secondary to their durative aspect.

== Numerals ==
Dutch uses a decimal numeral system. Numerals are not inflected.

=== 0–9 ===
The numbers from 0 to 9 are:

0	1	2	3	4	5	6	7	8	9
nul	een	twee	drie	vier	vijf	zes	zeven	acht	negen

een is the same word as the indefinite article in the written language. When confusion is possible, the number is often written as één to distinguish it from the article. The pronunciation differentiates them in speech: the article is /ən/, the numeral is /eːn/.

=== 10–19 ===
The numbers 10, 11 and 12 are irregular. 13 to 19 are formed by adding -tien ("-teen") to the base number. Two are slightly irregular: 13 is dertien with metathesis (compare English thirteen), and 14 is veertien.

10	11	12	13	14	15	16	17	18	19
tien	elf	twaalf	dertien	veertien	vijftien	zestien	zeventien	achttien	negentien

=== 20–99 ===
The decades 20 to 90 are formed by adding -tig ("-ty") to the base number. However, some are slightly irregular: 20 is twintig, 30 and 40 are dertig and veertig (comparable to 13 and 14 above), 80 is tachtig. The remaining decades, although spelled beginning with v and z, are often pronounced beginning with voiceless /f/ and /s/ even in dialects that normally do not devoice those consonants.

10	20	30	40	50	60	70	80	90
tien	twintig	dertig	veertig	vijftig	zestig	zeventig	tachtig	negentig

Combinations of a decade and a unit are constructed in a regular way: the unit comes first, followed by en ("and"), followed by the decade. No spaces are written between them, and a diaeresis is added when necessary. For example:

- 28 achtentwintig ("eight and twenty")
- 83 drieëntachtig ("three and eighty")
- 99 negenennegentig ("nine and ninety")

=== Hundreds ===
100 is honderd. Multiples of 100 are expressed by placing the multiple before honderd, without any spaces: 200 tweehonderd, 300 driehonderd and so on. Sometimes multiples higher than 10 can be used as synonyms for the thousands, such as 1100 elfhonderd, 2500 vijfentwintighonderd.

Combinations of a hundred and a lower number are expressed by just placing them together, with the hundred coming first. Sometimes, en is added in between, but that is optional and no longer commonly done.

- 112 honderdtwaalf or honderdentwaalf
- 698 zeshonderdachtennegentig
- 1258 twaalfhonderdachtenvijftig

=== Thousands ===
The number 1000 is duizend. Unlike in English, it is not preceded by an article. The same system used for naming the hundreds applies to the thousands as well, so multiples of 1000 are expressed by writing the multiple right before: 2000 tweeduizend, 3000 drieduizend, 20000 twintigduizend, 999000 negenhonderdnegenennegentigduizend.

Combinations of a thousand and a lower number are expressed by placing them together, with the thousand coming first. A space is written between them.

- 1 258 duizend tweehonderdachtenvijftig
- 9 001 negenduizend een
- 32 348 tweeëndertigduizend driehonderdachtenveertig
- 123 456 honderddrieëntwintigduizend vierhonderdzesenvijftig

=== Millions and above ===
Dutch always uses the long scale system.

- 1 000 000 miljoen
- 1 000 000 000 miljard
- 1 000 000 000 000 biljoen
- 1 000 000 000 000 000 biljard
- etc.

Multiples of any of them are similar to the thousands, but a space is written between the multiple and the "million": 2 000 000 twee miljoen, 420 000 000 000 vierhonderdtwintig miljard. If the multiple is 1, it must also be present, unlike with the thousands where it is left out: 1 000 000 een miljoen.

Combinations with lower numbers are much the same as with the thousands.

- 117 401 067 honderdzeventien miljoen vierhonderdeenduizend zevenenzestig
- 10 987 654 321 tien miljard negenhonderdzevenentachtig miljoen zeshonderdvierenvijftigduizend driehonderdeenentwintig

=== Ordinal numbers ===
Ordinal numbers behave and inflect like superlative adjectives. Unlike normal adjectives, they always appear in the inflected form; always ending in -e ignoring whether the following noun is neuter or not, and are usually preceded by a definite article of some kind.

The ordinal adjectives are formed by adding either -de or -ste to the base number. Which one is added depends on the word. The numbers 1 and 3 have irregular ordinals.

1st	2nd	3rd	4th	5th	6th	7th	8th	9th
eerste	tweede	derde	vierde	vijfde	zesde	zevende	achtste	negende
10th	11th	12th	13–19th	20–90th	100th	1 000th	1 000 000th+	1 000 000 000th+
tiende	elfde	twaalfde	-tiende	-tigste	honderdste	duizendste	-joenste	-jardste

When a number is composed of multiple parts, the ending is added only to the last part of the word, and follows the rules for that word. Thus, 21st eenentwintigste, 409th vierhonderdnegende, 9001st negenduizend eerste.

=== Fractional numbers ===
Fractional numbers are expressed using a cardinal number for the numerator, and an ordinal for the denominator, like in English.

- 1/5 een vijfde
- 3/8 drie achtste

1/2 and 1/4 are een half ("a half") and een kwart ("a quarter") respectively, although the regular een tweede and een vierde are also possible, but rarer. In 3/4, the space is often left out: driekwart.

When combined with a full cardinal, the full cardinal comes first and they are separated by en and spaces. The word en can be left out if the numerator is not 1.

- 9 3/4 negen (en) driekwart
- 5 1/6 vijf en een zesde
- 3 1/2 drie en een half

The combination 1 1/2 is usually expressed irregularly as anderhalf, which literally means "other half" (ander was originally a synonym of tweede, and the combination meant "second, minus a half").

=== Iterative numbers ===
These express repetition, like "once" or "five times". They are formed with a cardinal number followed by maal or keer (both meaning "times").

- twee maal/keer ("two times, twice")
- negen maal/keer ("nine times")
- honderd maal/keer ("a hundred times")

The space is often left out for the combinations eenmaal ("once"), tweemaal ("twice") and driemaal ("thrice"), but not with keer.

There are also ordinal forms of those forms. They express an iteration within a sequence of repetitions. They are formed with an ordinal instead of a cardinal, and act as masculine nouns.

- de eerste keer/maal ("the first time")
- de dertigste keer/maal ("the thirtieth time")

=== Multiplicative numbers ===
They express a multiple of something. They are formed with the suffix -voud '-fold' and are neuter nouns.

- tweevoud 'a twofold, multiple of two'
- drievoud 'a threefold, multiple of three'
- honderdvoud 'a hundredfold, multiple of hundred'

For the number 1, enkelvoud 'singular(ity), a onefold' is used, which is derived from enkel 'single' rather than een. The "regular" form eenvoud instead means 'simpleness, uncomplicatedness, ease'.

Adjectives are formed by adding -ig to form the combination -voudig.

- tweevoudig 'double, twofold'
- drievoudig 'triple, threefold'
- honderdvoudig 'hundredfold'

Again, enkelvoudig 'single, simple, onefold' is used for 1, and eenvoudig means 'simple, uncomplicated, easy'. Alternatively, the word enkel 'single' can be used alone. A synonym for tweevoudig is dubbel.

== See also ==
- Dutch declension
- Dutch conjugation
- DT-Manie
- Dutch Wikipedia on hen and hun
