= Tense–aspect–mood =

Grammatical system of a language that covers the expression of tense, aspect, and mood

Tense–aspect–mood (commonly abbreviated TAM in linguistics) or tense–modality–aspect (abbreviated as TMA) is an important group of grammatical categories, which are marked in different ways by different languages.

TAM covers the expression of three major components of words which lead to or assist in the correct understanding of the speaker's meaning:

- Tense—the position of the state or action in time, that is, whether it is in the past, present or future.
- Aspect—the extension of the state or action in time, that is, whether it is unitary (perfective), continuous (imperfective) or repeated (habitual).
- Mood or modality—the reality of the state or action, that is, whether it is actual (realis), a possibility or a necessity (irrealis).

For example, in English the word "walk" would be used in different ways for the different combinations of TAM:

- Tense: He walked (past), He walks (present).
- Aspect: He walked (unitary), He was walking (continuous), He used to walk (habitual).
- Mood: I can walk (possibility), Walk faster! (necessity).

In the last example, there is no difference in the articulation of the word, although it is being used in a different way, one for conveying information, the other for instructing.

In some languages, evidentiality (whether evidence exists for the statement, and if so what kind) and mirativity (surprise) may also be included. Therefore, some authors extend this term as "tense–aspect–mood–evidentiality" (TAME in short).

== Tense–mood–aspect conflation ==
It is often difficult to untangle these features of a language. Several features (or categories) may be conveyed by a single grammatical construction (for instance, English -s is used for the third person singular present). However, this system may not be complete in that not all possible combinations may have an available construction. On the other hand, the same category may be expressed with multiple constructions. In other cases, there may not be delineated categories of tense and mood, or aspect and mood.

For instance, many Indo-European languages do not clearly distinguish tense from aspect.

In some languages, such as Spanish and Modern Greek, the imperfective aspect is fused with the past tense in a form traditionally called the imperfect. Other languages with distinct past imperfectives include Latin and Persian.

In the traditional grammatical description of some languages, including English, many Romance languages, and Greek and Latin, "tense" or the equivalent term in that language refers to a set of inflected or periphrastic verb forms that express a combination of tense, aspect, and mood.

In Spanish, the simple conditional (condicional simple) is classified as one of the simple tenses (tiempos simples), but is named for the mood (conditional) that it expresses. In Ancient Greek, the perfect tense (χρόνος παρακείμενος, khrónos parakeímenos) is a set of forms that express both present tense and perfect aspect (finite forms), or simply perfect aspect (non-finite forms).

However, not all languages conflate tense, aspect and mood. Some analytic languages such as Creole languages have separate grammatical markers for tense, aspect, and/or mood, which comes close to the theoretical distinction.

== Creoles ==
Creoles, both Atlantic and non-Atlantic, tend to share a large number of syntactic features, including the avoidance of bound morphemes. Tense, aspect, and mood are usually indicated with separate invariant pre-verbal auxiliaries. Typically the unmarked verb is used for either the timeless habitual or the stative aspect or the past perfective tense–aspect combination. In general creoles tend to put less emphasis on marking tense than on marking aspect. Typically aspectually unmarked stative verbs can be marked with the anterior tense, and non-statives, with or without the anterior marker, can optionally be marked for the progressive, habitual, or completive aspect or for the irrealis mood. In some creoles the anterior can be used to mark the counterfactual. When any of tense, aspect, and modality are specified, they are typically indicated separately with the invariant pre-verbal markers in the sequence anterior relative tense (prior to the time focused on), irrealis mode (conditional or future), non-punctual aspect.

=== Hawaiian Creole English ===
Hawaiian Creole English (HCE), or Hawaiian Pidgin, is a creole language with most of its vocabulary drawn from its superstrate English, but as with all creoles its grammar is very different from that of its superstrate. HCE verbs have only two morphologically distinct forms: the unmarked form (e.g. teik "take") and the progressive form with the suffix -in appended to the unmarked form (teikin "taking"). The past tense is indicated either by the unmarked form or by the preverbal auxiliary wen (Ai wen see om "I saw him") or bin (especially among older speakers) or haed (especially on Kauai). However, for "to say" the marked past tense has the obligatory irregular form sed "said", and there are optional irregular past tense forms sin or saw = wen si "saw", keim = wen kam "came", and tol = wen tel "told". The past is indicated only once in a sentence since it is a relative tense.

The future marker is the preverbal auxiliary gon or goin "am/is/are going to": gon bai "is going to buy". The future of the past tense/aspect uses the future form since the use of the past tense form to mark the time of perspective retains its influence throughout the rest of the sentence: Da gai sed hi gon fiks mi ap ("The guy said he [was] gonna fix me up").

There are various preverbal modal auxiliaries: kaen "can", laik "want to", gata "have got to", haeftu "have to", baeta "had better", sapostu "am/is/are supposed to". Tense markers are used infrequently before modals: gon kaen kam "is going to be able to come". Waz "was" can indicate past tense before the future marker gon and the modal sapostu: Ai waz gon lift weits "I was gonna lift weights"; Ai waz sapostu go "I was supposed to go".

There is a preverbal auxiliary yustu for past tense habitual aspect: yustu tink so ("used to think so"). The progressive aspect can be marked with the auxiliary ste in place of or in addition to the verbal suffix -in: Wat yu ste it? = Wat yu itin? ("What are you eating?"); Wi ste mekin da plaen ("We're making the plan"). The latter, double-marked, form tends to imply a transitory nature of the action. Without the suffix, ste can alternatively indicate perfective aspect: Ai ste kuk da stu awredi ("I cooked the stew already"); this is true, for instance, after a modal: yu sapostu ste mek da rais awredi ("You're supposed to have made the rice already"). Stat is an auxiliary for inchoative aspect when combined with the verbal suffix -in: gon stat plein ("gonna start playing"). The auxiliary pau without the verbal suffix indicates completion: pau tich "finish(ed) teaching". Aspect auxiliaries can co-occur with tense markers: gon ste plei ("gonna be playing"); wen ste it ("was eating").

== Modern Greek ==
Modern Greek distinguishes the perfective and imperfective aspects by the use of two different verb stems. For the imperfective aspect, suffixes are used to indicate the past tense indicative mood, the non-past indicative mood, and the subjunctive and imperative moods. For the perfective aspect, suffixes are used to indicate the past tense indicative mood, the subjunctive mood, and the imperative mood. The perfective subjunctive is twice as common as the imperfective subjunctive. The subjunctive mood form is used in dependent clauses and in situations where English would use an infinitive (which is absent in Greek).

There is a perfect form in both tenses, which is expressed by an inflected form of the imperfective auxiliary verb έχω "have" and an invariant verb form derived from the perfective stem of the main verb. The perfect form is much rarer than in English. The non-past perfect form is a true perfect aspect as in English.

In addition, all the basic forms (past and non-past, imperfective and perfective) can be combined with a particle indicating future tense/conditional mood. Combined with the non-past forms, this expresses an imperfective future and a perfective future. Combined with the imperfective past it is used to indicate the conditional, and with the perfective past to indicate the inferential. If the future particle precedes the present perfect form, a future perfect form results.

== Indo-Aryan languages ==
=== Hindustani ===
In Hindustani, grammatical aspects are overtly marked. There are four aspects in Hindustani: Simple Aspect, Habitual Aspect, Perfective Aspect and Progressive Aspect. Periphrastic Hindustani verb forms consist of two elements; the first of these two elements is the aspect marker and the second element (the copula) is the tense-mood marker. These three aspects are formed from their participle forms being used with the copula verb of Hindustani. However, the aspectual participles can also have the verbs rêhnā (to stay/remain), ānā (to come) & jānā (to go) as their copula which themselves can be conjugated into any of the three grammatical aspects hence forming sub-aspects. Each copula besides honā (to be) gives a different nuance to the aspect.

Simple Aspect	Perfective Aspect					Habitual Aspect				Progressive Aspect		Translation
honā	huā honā	huā rêhnā	huā jānā	huā ānā	huā karnā	hotā honā	hotā rêhnā	hotā jānā	hotā ānā	ho rahā honā	ho rahā rêhnā	to happen
karnā	kiyā honā	kiyā rêhnā	kiyā jānā	kiyā ānā	kiyā karnā	kartā honā	kartā rêhnā	kartā jānā	kartā ānā	kar rahā honā	kar rahā rêhnā	to do
marnā	marā honā	marā rêhnā	marā jānā	marā ānā	marā karnā	martā honā	martā rêhnā	martā jānā	martā ānā	mar rahā honā	mar rahā rêhnā	to die

The habitual aspect infinitives when formed using the copula rêhnā (to stay, remain) the following sub-aspectual forms are formed:

Habitual Aspect
Habitual Subaspect	Perfective Subaspect	Progressive Subaspect
hotā rêhtā honā	hotā rahā honā	hotā rêh rahā honā
kartā rêhtā honā	kartā rahā honā	kartā rêh rahā honā
martā rêhtā honā	martā rahā honā	martā rêh rahā honā

The main copula honā (to be) in its conjugated form is shown in the table below. These conjugated forms are used to assign a tense and a grammatical mood to the aspectual forms.

Conjugations of the tense/mood marker copula - honā (to be)
mood	person		1P	2P	3P, 2P	3P, 2P, 1P
mood	pronoun		ma͠i	tum	ye/vo, tū	ye/vo, āp, ham
mood	plurality		singular	plural	singular	singular, plural
indicative	present		hū̃	ho	hai	ha͠i
indicative	perfect	♂	huā	hue	huā	hue
indicative	perfect	♀	huī			huī̃
indicative	imperfect	♂	thā	the	thā	the
indicative	imperfect	♀	thī			thī̃
indicative	future	♂	hoū̃gā	hooge	hoegā	hoẽge
indicative	future	♀	hoū̃gī	hoogī	hoegī	hoẽgī
presumptive	present, past, future	♂	hū̃gā	hoge	hogā	honge
presumptive	present, past, future	♀	hū̃gī	hogī		hongī
subjunctive	present		hū̃	ho		hõ
subjunctive	future		hoū̃	hoo	hoe	hoẽ
contrafactual	past	♂	hotā	hote	hotā	hote
contrafactual	past	♀	hotī			hotī̃
imperative	present	♂	—	hoo	ho	hoiye
imperative	future	♀	—	honā	hoiyo	hoiyegā

== Slavic languages ==
In all Slavic languages, most verbs come in pairs with one member indicating an imperfective aspect and the other indicating a perfective one.

=== Russian ===
Most Russian verbs come in pairs, one with imperfective aspect and the other with perfective aspect, the latter usually formed from the former with a prefix but occasionally with a stem change or using a different root. Perfective verbs, whether derived or basic, can be made imperfective with a suffix. Each aspect has a past form and a non-past form. The non-past verb forms are conjugated by person/number, while the past verb forms are conjugated by gender/number. The present tense is indicated with the non-past imperfective form. The future in the perfective aspect is expressed by applying the conjugation of the present form to the perfective version of the verb. There is also a compound future imperfective form consisting of the future of "to be" plus the infinitive of the imperfective verb.

The conditional mood is expressed by a particle (=English "would") after the past tense form. There are conjugated modal verbs, followed by the infinitive, for obligation, necessity, and possibility/permission.

== Romance languages ==
Romance languages have from five to eight simple inflected forms capturing tense–aspect–mood, as well as corresponding compound structures combining the simple forms of "to have" or "to be" with a past participle. There is a perfective/imperfective aspect distinction.

=== French ===
French has inflectionally distinct imperative, subjunctive, indicative and conditional mood forms. As in English, the conditional mood form can also be used to indicate a future-as-viewed-from-the-past tense–aspect combination in the indicative mood. The subjunctive mood form is used frequently to express doubt, desire, request, etc. in dependent clauses. There are indicative mood forms for, in addition to the future-as-viewed-from-the-past usage of the conditional mood form, the following combinations: future; an imperfective past tense–aspect combination whose form can also be used in contrary-to-fact "if" clauses with present reference; a perfective past tense–aspect combination whose form is only used for literary purposes; and a catch-all formulation known as the "present" form, which can be used to express the present, past historical events, or the near-future. All synthetic forms are also marked for person and number.

Additionally, the indicative mood has five compound (two-word) verb forms, each of which results from using one of the above simple forms of "to have" (or of "to be" for intransitive verbs of motion) plus a past participle. These forms are used to shift back the time of an event relative to the time from which the event is viewed. This perfect form as applied to the present tense does not represent the perfect tense/aspect (past event with continuation to or relevance for the present), but rather represents a perfective past tense–aspect combination (a past action viewed in its entirety).

Unlike Italian or Spanish, French does not mark for a continuous aspect. Thus, "I am doing it" and "I do it" both translate to the same sentence in French: Je le fais. However, this information is often clear from context, and when not, it can be conveyed using periphrasis: for example, the expression être en train de [faire quelque chose] ("to be in the middle of [doing something]") is often used to convey the sense of a continuous aspect; the addition of adverbs like encore ("still") may also convey the continuous, repetitive or frequent aspects. The use of the participle mood (at present tense, inherited from the Latin gerundive) has almost completely fallen out of use in modern French for denoting the continuous aspect of verbs, but remains used for other aspects like simultaneity or causality, and this participle mood also competes with the infinitive mood (seen as a form of nominalisation of the verb) for other aspects marked by nominal prepositions.

=== Italian ===
Italian has synthetic forms for the indicative, imperative, conditional, and subjunctive moods. The conditional mood form can also be used for hearsay: Secondo lui, sarebbe tempo di andare "According to him, it would be [is] time to go". The indicative mood has simple forms (one word, but conjugated by person and number) for the present tense, the imperfective aspect in the past tense, the perfective aspect in the past, and the future (and the future form can also be used to express present probability, as in the English "It will be raining now"). As with other Romance languages, compound verbs shifting the action to the past from the point in time from which it is perceived can be formed by preceding a past participle by a conjugated simple form of "to have", or "to be" in the case of intransitive verbs. As with French, this form when applied to the present tense of "to have" or "to be" does not convey perfect aspect but rather the perfective aspect in the past. In the compound pluperfect, the helping verb is in the past imperfective form in a main clause but in the past perfective form in a dependent clause.

Unlike French, Italian has a form to express progressive aspect: in either the present or the past imperfective, the verb stare ("to stand", "to be temporarily") conjugated for person and number is followed by a present gerund (indicated by the suffix -ando or -endo ("-ing")).

=== Portuguese ===
Portuguese has synthetic forms for the indicative, imperative, conditional, and subjunctive moods. The conditional mood form can also express past probability:

Seria ele que falava
{it would be} he that {was speaking}

The subjunctive form seldom appears outside dependent clauses. In the indicative, there are five one-word forms conjugated for person and number: one for the present tense (which can indicate progressive or non-progressive aspect); one for the perfective aspect of the past; one for the imperfective aspect of the past; a form for the pluperfect aspect that is only used in formal writing; and a future tense form that, as in Italian, can also indicate present tense combined with probabilistic modality.

As with other Romance languages, compound verbs shifting the time of action to the past relative to the time from which it is perceived can be formed by preceding a past participle by a conjugated simple form of "to have". Using the past tense of the helping verb gives the pluperfect form that is used in conversation. Using the present tense form of the helping verb gives a true perfect aspect, though one whose scope is narrower than that in English: It refers to events occurring in the past and extending to the present, as in Tem feito muito frio este inverno ("It's been very cold this winter (and still is)").

Portuguese expresses progressive aspect in any tense by using conjugated estar ("to stand", "to be temporarily"), plus the present participle ending in -ando, -endo, or indo: Estou escrevendo uma carta ("I am writing a letter").

Futurity can be expressed in three ways other than the simple future form:

Vou ver João esta tarde
{I go} {to see} John this afternoon

Temos que ver João hoje
{we have} that {to see} John today

Hei de ver João amanhã
{I have} of {to see} John tomorrow

=== Spanish ===
Spanish morphologically distinguishes the indicative, imperative, subjunctive, and conditional moods. In the indicative mood, there are synthetic (one-word, conjugated for person/number) forms for the present tense, the past tense in the imperfective aspect, the past tense in the perfective aspect, and the future tense. The past can be viewed from any given time perspective by using conjugated "to have" in any of its synthetic forms plus the past participle. When this compound form is used with the present tense form of "to have", perfect tense/aspect (past action with present continuation or relevance) is conveyed (as in Portuguese but unlike in Italian or French).

Spanish expresses the progressive similarly to English, Italian, and Portuguese, using the verb "to be" plus the present participle: estoy leyendo "I am reading".

== Germanic languages ==
Germanic languages tend to have two morphologically distinct simple forms, for past and non-past, as well as a compound construction for the past or for the perfect, and they use modal auxiliary verbs. The simple forms, the first part of the non-modal compound form, and possibly the modal auxiliaries, are usually conjugated for person and/or number. A subjunctive mood form is sometimes present. English also has a compound construction for continuous aspect. Unlike some Indo-European languages such as the Romance and Slavic languages, Germanic languages have no perfective/imperfective dichotomy.

=== German ===
The most common past tense construction in German is the haben ("to have") plus past participle (or for intransitive verbs of motion, the sein ("to be") plus past participle) form, which is a pure past construction rather than conveying perfect aspect. The past progressive is conveyed by the simple past form. The future can be conveyed by the auxiliary werden, which is conjugated for person and number; but often the simple non-past form is used to convey the future (in fact, werden is also used to mark an assumptive similar to dürfte, müsste 'should' and wohl 'arguably', such as when it is combined with jetzt 'now', and this may be considered its primary function, from which future marking is derived). Modality is conveyed via conjugated pre-verbal modals: müssen "to have to", wollen "to want to", können "to be able to"; würden "would" (conditional), sollten "should" (the subjunctive form of sollen), sollen "to be supposed to", mögen "to like", dürfen "to be allowed to".

=== Danish ===
Danish has the usual Germanic simple past and non-past tense forms and the compound construction using "to have" (or for intransitive verbs of motion, "to be"), the compound construction indicating past tense rather than perfect aspect. Futurity is usually expressed with the simple non-past form, but the auxiliary modals vil ("want") and skal ("must"—obligation) are sometimes used (see Future tense#Danish). Other modals include kan ("can"), kan gerne ("may"—permission), må ("must"), and må gerne ("may—permission). Progressivity can be expressed periphrastically as in:

er ved at læse
is {in process} to read

er i færd med at vaske
is in process with to wash

sidder og læser
sits and reads

står og taler
stands and talks

The subjunctive mood form has disappeared except for a few stock phrases.

=== Dutch ===
The simple non-past form can convey the progressive, which can also be expressed by the infinitive preceded by liggen "lie", lopen "walk, run", staan "stand", or zitten "sit" plus te. The compound "have" (or "be" before intransitive verbs of motion toward a specific destination) plus past participle is synonymous with, and more frequently used than, the simple past form, which is used especially for narrating a past sequence of events. The past perfect construction is analogous to that in English.

Futurity is often expressed with the simple non-past form, but can also be expressed using the infinitive preceded by the conjugated present tense of zullen; the latter form can also be used for probabilistic modality in the present. Futurity can also be expressed with "go" plus the infinitive:

Hij gaat een brief schrijven
he goes a letter {to write}
"He is going to write a letter."

The future perfect tense/aspect combination is formed by conjugated zullen + hebben ("to have") (or zijn ("to be")) + past participle: Zij zullen naar Breda gegaan zijn ("They will have gone to Breda").

The conditional mood construction uses the conjugated past tense of zullen:

Hij zou graag thuis blijven
he would gladly home {to stay}
"He would gladly stay home."

The past tense/conditional mood combination is formed using the auxiliary "to have" or "to be":

Hij zou graag thuis gebleven zijn
he would gladly home stayed {to be}
"He would gladly have stayed home."

In contemporary use the subjunctive form is mostly, but not completely, confined to set phrases and semi-fixed expressions, though in older Dutch texts the use of the subjunctive form can be encountered frequently.

There are various conjugated modal auxiliaries: kunnen "to be able", moeten "to have to", mogen "to be possible" or "to have permission", willen "to want to", laten "to allow" or "to cause". Unlike in English, these modals can be combined with the future tense form:

Hij zal ons niet kunnen helpen
he will us not {to be able} {to help}
"He will not be able to help us".

=== Icelandic ===
As with other Germanic languages, Icelandic has two simple verb forms: past and non-past. Compound constructions that look to the past from a given time perspective use conjugated "to have" (or "to be" for intransitive verbs of motion) plus past participle. In each voice there are forms for the indicative mood and the subjunctive mood for each of the simple past, the simple non-past, the perfect, the past perfect, the future, and the future perfect, and there are a non-past conditional mood form and a past conditional mood form, as well as an imperative mood. The perfect form is used for a past event with reference to the present or stretching to the present, or for a past event about which there is doubt, so the perfect form represents aspect or modality and not tense. The future tense form is seldom used. The non-past subjunctive form expresses a wish or command; the past subjunctive form expresses possibility. The indicative mood form is used in both clauses of "if [possible situation]...then..." sentences, although "if" can be replaced by the use of the subjunctive mood form. The subjunctive form is used in both clauses of "if [imaginary situation]...then..." sentences, and is often used in subordinate clauses. There are various modal auxiliary verbs. There is a progressive construction using "to be" which is used only for abstract concepts like "learn" and not for activities like "sit": ég er að læra "I am [at] learning".

=== English ===
The English language allows a wide variety of expressions of combinations of tense, aspect, and mood, with a variety of grammatical constructions. These constructions involve pure morphological changes (suffixes and internal sound changes of the verb), conjugated compound verbs, and invariant auxiliaries. For English tam from the perspective of modality, see Palmer; and Nielsen for English tam from the perspective of tense, see Comrie and Fleischman; for English tam from the perspective of aspect, see Comrie.

==== The unmarked verb ====
The unmarked verb form (as in run, feel) is the infinitive with the particle to omitted. It indicates nonpast tense with no modal implication. In an inherently stative verb such as feel, it can indicate present time (I feel well) or future in dependent clauses (I'll come tomorrow if I feel better). In an inherently non-stative verb such as run, the unmarked form can indicate gnomic or habitual situations (birds fly; I run every day) or scheduled futurity, often with a habitual reading (tomorrow I run the 100 metre race at 5:00; next month I run the 100 metre race every day). Non-stative verbs in unmarked form appearing in dependent clauses can indicate even unscheduled futurity (I'll feel better after I run tomorrow; I'll feel better if I run every day next month).

The unmarked verb is negated by preceding it with do/does not (I do not feel well, He does not run every day). Here do has no implication of emphasis, unlike the affirmative (I do feel better, I do run every day).

==== Morphological changes ====
The aspectually and modally unmarked past tense is usually marked for tense by the suffix -ed, pronounced as /t/, /d/, or /əd/ depending on the phonological context. However, over 400 verbs (including over 200 with distinct roots – short verbs for features of everyday life, of Germanic origin) are irregular and their morphological changes are internal (as in I take, I took). (See List of English irregular verbs.) This aspectually unmarked past tense form appears in innately stative verbs ("I felt bad.") and in non-stative verbs, in which case the aspect could be habitual ("I took one brownie every day last week.") or perfective ("I took a brownie yesterday."), but not progressive.

This form is negated with an invariant analytical construction using the morphologically unmarked verb (I / he did not feel bad, I did not take a brownie). As with do and do not, no emphasis is imparted by the use of did in combination with the negative not (compare the affirmative I / he did take the brownie, in which did conveys emphasis).

For the morphological changes associated with the subjunctive mood, see English subjunctive.

==== Conjugated compound verbs ====
There are two types of conjugated compound verbs in English, which can be combined.

- The construction "have/has" + morphologically altered verb (usually with the suffix -"ed") indicates a combination of tense and aspect: For example, "have taken'" indicates a present viewing of a past or past and present event, so the continuing relevance of the event is an aspectual feature of the construction. The event in the past could be either stative, habitual, or perfective aspect, but not progressive.

Furthermore, the time of viewing itself can be placed in the past, by replacing have/has with had: had taken indicates a past viewing of an event prior to the viewing.

The have/has/had + verb + -ed construction is negated by inserting not between the two words of the affirmative (have/has/had not taken).

- The construction "am/is/are" + verb + -"ing" indicates present tense combined with progressive aspect if the verb is innately non-stative, as in "I am taking it," or combined with innate stative aspect, as in "I am feeling better." For some stative verbs such as feel, the innate stative nature can be unmarked, so the simple verb form is used (I feel better), or it can be marked (as in I am feeling better) with no difference in meaning. For some other statives, however, either the unmarked form must be used (I know French, but not *I am knowing French) or the marked form must be used (I am experiencing boredom, I am basking in glory, but not I experience boredom or I bask in glory, which would imply a non-stative (specifically habitual) use of the verb).

The am/is/are + verb + ing construction is negated by inserting not between the two words of the affirmative (am/is/are not taking).

- The above two forms can be combined, to indicate a present or past view of a prior (or prior and current) event that occurred with stative or progressive aspect ("I have/had been feeling well," "I have/had been taking classes"); here the construction is "have/has/had" + "been" + main verb + -"ing". There is a subtle difference in usage between the case where the viewpoint is from the present and the case where it is from a point in the past: have been taking classes implies that the action is not only of present relevance but is continuing to occur; in contrast, had been taking classes indicates relevance at the reference time, and allows but does not require the action to still be occurring (I had been taking classes but was not still doing so; I had been taking classes and still was).

This combined form is negated by inserting not after have/has/had (I have not been taking classes).

Both of these morphological changes can be combined with the compound verbal constructions given below involving invariant auxiliaries, to form verb phrases such as will have been taking.

==== Invariant auxiliaries ====
Aside from the above-mentioned auxiliary verbs, English has fourteen invariant auxiliaries (often called modal verbs), which are used before the morphologically unmarked verb to indicate mood, aspect, tense, or some combination thereof. Some of these have more than one modal interpretation, the choice between which must be based on context; in these cases, the equivalent past tense construction may apply to one but not the other of the modal interpretations. For more details see English modal verbs.

- used to indicates both past tense and habitual aspect ("I used to run every day.") or occasionally stative aspect ("The sun used to shine more brightly"). It cannot be used with the very recent past (*I used to run every day last week is not acceptable, but I used to run every day last summer is acceptable though usually no lexical time marker like last summer is included). The form that negates the main verb is used not to + verb (or used to not + verb); the form that negates habituality is did not use to + verb.
- would has three alternative uses:

- past tense combined with habitual aspect ("Last summer I would run every day.")
- conditional mood for a present or future action (If I could, I would do it now / next week). In the first person, intentional modality may also be present.
- past tense, prospective aspect for an action occurring after the past-tense viewpoint ("After I graduated in 1990, I would work in industry for the next ten years.")
The negative form would not + verb negates the main verb, but in the conditional and intentional mood in the first person the intentional modality may also be negated to indicate negative intention.

- will has a number of different uses involving tense, aspect, and modality:

- It can express aspect alone, without implying futurity: In "He will make mistakes, won't he?", the reference is to a tendency in the past, present, and future and as such expresses habitual aspect.

- It can express either of two types of modality alone, again without implying futurity: In "That will be John at the door", there is an implication of present time and probabilistic mode, while "You will do it right now" implies obligatory mode.

- It can express both intentional modality and futurity, as in "I will do it."

- It can express futurity without modality: "The sun will die in a few billion years."

As with would, the negative form will not negates the main verb but in the intentional mode may also indicate negative intentionality.

In each case the time of viewpoint can be placed in the past by replacing will with would.

- shall indicates futurity or intention in the first person (I shall go); for the other persons, it indicates obligation, often negative as in you shall not lie, but this usage is old-fashioned.
- must can be used either for near-certainty mode (He must understand it by now) or for obligatory mode (You must do that). The past tense form must have understood applies only to the near-certainty mode; expressing obligation in the past requires the lexical construction had to + verb.
- had better and had best both indicate obligatory mode (He had better do that soon). Often had is omitted (He best be gone soon). There is no corresponding past tense form.
- should has several uses:

- present or future tense combined with possibility mode: If he should be here already, ...; If he should arrive tomorrow, ...
- mild obligatory mode in the present or future tense: He should do that now / next week. The past tense can be substituted by using the form He should have done that, with a morphological change to the main verb.
- probabilistic mode in the present or future tense: This approach should work. The corresponding past tense form should have worked implies impersonal obligation rather than probability.

- ought to + verb can mean the same thing as either of the last two mentioned uses of should: mild obligatory mode in present or future (He ought to do that now / next week) or probabilistic mode in the present or future (This approach ought to work). The past tense form ought to have done that, ought to have worked, with a morphological change to the main verb, conveys the same information as the corresponding should have form in both cases.
- may can indicate either the mode of possibility or that of permission:

- possibility in the present or future: He may be there already, He may arrive tomorrow. The form "He may have arrived," with a morphological change to the main verb, indicates not just the mode of possibility but also the aspectual feature of viewing a past event from a present viewpoint. This form applies only to this possibility usage.

- permission in the present or future: You may go now / next week. There is no corresponding way to indicate the presence of permission in the past.

- can has several uses:

- present ability: I can swim. The past tense is expressed by I could swim.
- present permission (in informal speech): You can go now. In the past tense one can use could (When I was a child, according to my parents' rules I could swim once a week).
- present moderate probability (seldom used): That can be true. There is no past form, since the more common that could be true conveys the same (present) tense.

- might conveys slight likelihood in the present or future (He might be there already, he might arrive tomorrow). It can also convey slight advisability (You might try that). The past can be substituted using the form might have + morphologically altered main verb.
- could is used in several ways:

- mild permission or advisability in the present: You could do that. The equivalent past form is could have + morphologically altered main verb (you could have done that).

- permission in the past: She said I could graduate in one more year.

- ability in the past: I could swim when I was five years old.

- slight probability in the present: That could be Mary at the door. The past tense equivalent is That could have been Mary at the door yesterday, with a morphologically altered main verb.

- conditional ability: I could do that if I knew how to swim. In the past one can say I could have done that if I had known how to swim.

- slight intention in the present: I could do that for you (and maybe I will). There is no past equivalent.

- need: Need can be used as a present tense modal auxiliary, indicating necessity, that is invariant for person/number in questions and negatives only: Need he go?, He need not go. The corresponding past tense constructions are Need he have gone?, He need not have gone.
- dare: Dare can be used as a present tense modal auxiliary that is invariant for person/number in questions and negatives only: Dare he go?, He dare not go.

== Basque ==
Although several verbal categories are expressed purely morphologically in Basque, periphrastic verbal formations predominate. For the few verbs that have synthetic conjugations, Basque has forms for past tense continuous aspect (state or ongoing action) and present tense continuous aspect, as well as imperative mood.

In the compound verbal constructions, there are forms for the indicative mood, the conditional mood, a mood for conditional possibility ("would be able to"), an imperative mood, a mood of ability or possibility, a mood for hypothetical "if" clauses in the present or future time, a counterfactual mood in the past tense, and a subjunctive mood (used mostly in literary style in complement clauses and purpose/wish clauses). Within the indicative mood, there is a present tense habitual aspect form (which can also be used with stative verbs), a past tense habitual aspect form (which also can be used with stative verbs), a near past tense form, a remote past tense form (which can also be used to convey past perspective on an immediately prior situation or event), a future-in-the-past form (which can also be used modally for a conjecture about the past or as a conditional result of a counterfactual premise), and a future tense form (which can also be used for the modality of present conjecture, especially with a lexically stative verb, or of determination/intention).

There are also some constructions showing an even greater degree of periphrasis: one for progressive aspect and ones for the modalities of volition ("want to"), necessity/obligation ("have to", "need to"), and ability ("be able to").

== Hawaiian ==
Hawaiian is an isolating language, so its verbal grammar exclusively relies on unconjugated auxiliary verbs. It has indicative and imperative mood forms, the imperative indicated by e + verb (or in the negative by mai + verb). In the indicative its tense/aspect forms are: unmarked (used generically and for the habitual aspect as well as the perfective aspect for past time), ua + verb (perfective aspect, but frequently replaced by the unmarked form), ke + verb + nei (present tense progressive aspect; very frequently used), and e + verb + ana (imperfective aspect, especially for non-present time).

Modality is expressed with different verbal auxiliaries. Pono conveys obligation/necessity as in He pono i na kamali'i a pau e maka'ala 'Children should beware'; ability is conveyed by hiki as in Ua hiki i keia kamali'i ke heluhelu 'This child can read'.

== See also ==
- Nominal TAM
- Screeve, a similar concept in Kartvelian languages
