= Dutch conjugation =

Conjugation of verbs in the Dutch language

This article explains the conjugation of verbs in Dutch by their classification, which is based on conjugational class and derivation. These classifications describe different aspects of verb structure and usage.

== Classification of verbs ==
=== By conjugational class ===
Dutch verbs can be grouped by their conjugational class, as follows:

- Weak verbs: past tense and past participle formed with a dental suffix
  - Weak verbs with past in -de
  - Weak verbs with past in -te
- Strong verbs: past tense formed by changing the vowel of the stem, past participle in -en
  - Class 1: pattern ij-ee-ee
  - Class 2: pattern ie-oo-oo or ui-oo-oo
  - Class 3: pattern i-o-o or e-o-o
  - Class 4: pattern ee-a/aa-oo
  - Class 5: pattern ee-a/aa-ee or i-a/aa-ee
  - Class 6: pattern aa-oe-aa
  - Class 7: pattern X-ie-X (specifically, oo-ie-oo, a-ie-a, a-i-a, ou-iel-ou, aa-ie-aa or oe-ie-oe)
  - Other strong verbs, which do not follow any of the above patterns
- Mixed verbs
  - Weak past tense (-de or -te), but strong past participle (-en)
  - Strong past tense (vowel change), but weak past participle (-d or -t)
- Irregular verbs: verbs that do not clearly conjugate as any of the above
  - Preterite-present verbs: verbs that originally had present tense forms identical to the past of a strong verb
  - Weak verbs with past in -cht
  - Other irregular verbs

=== By derivation ===
Another way to group verbs is by the type of derivation. The following can be distinguished:

- Basic: underived, compounded, or derived without prefixation
- Prefixed: with an unstressed prefix
- Separable: with a stressed adverbial (or rarely object-like) prefix

Most of this article shows the conjugation of basic verbs. The differences in prefixed and separable verbs are described here, and can be applied to any verb regardless of conjugation.

==== Prefixed verbs ====
Prefixed verbs are verbs whose stem begins with an unstressed prefix. The prefix is usually one of be-, ge-, her-, ont-, ver-, but others are also possible, often derived from adverbs or prepositions. Prefixed verbs are conjugated like basic verbs, except in the past participle. In the past participle, the inflectional prefix ge- is replaced by the verb's own prefix, and it is not added on. The past participle of her‧openen ("to reopen") is her‧opend (not *ge‧her‧opend), and for be‧talen ("to pay") it is be‧taald (not *ge‧be‧taald).

In some cases, two verbs exist that are spelled identically, but with one treating an adverb as a prefix, while the other treats it as separable. Such pairs are stressed and thus pronounced differently, and accent marks are sometimes written when there is a chance of confusion: voorkómen ("to prevent", prefixed) versus vóórkomen ("to occur", separable), or onder‧gáán ("to undergo", prefixed) versus ónder‧gaan ("to go under, to set", separable).

Prefixed verbs can be derived from basic verbs or from another prefixed verb. With the prefix her- ("again, re-"), it is also possible to derive prefixed verbs from separable verbs, but such verbs are often defective, with the separated (V2-affected) forms often being avoided by speakers. For example, the verb her‧in‧richten ("to rearrange, to redecorate") is a combination of the prefix her- and the separable verb in‧richten. According to the syntactical rules, this must become Ik richt de kamer herin. ("I redecorate the room"), but using herin as a separable particle is often avoided as it is not an independent word (unlike the separable particles of most other verbs). Many speakers choose to rephrase it using the adverb opnieuw ("again, anew"): Ik richt de kamer opnieuw in. In subordinate clauses or with a non-finite verb, there is less objection: Mijn vriend keek toe, terwijl ik de kamer herinrichtte. ("My friend looked on, while I redecorated the room.") or Ik heb de kamer heringericht. ("I have redecorated the room.").

Compound verbs borrowed from French or Latin are conjugated like prefixed verbs, but their past participle is made with ge-: con-strueren ("to construct"), ge‧con‧strueerd; pro‧duceren ("to produce"), ge‧pro‧duceerd (cf. German pro‧duziert, kon‧struiert).

==== Separable verbs ====
Separable verbs are combinations of a main verb (which can be basic or prefixed) and a particle. This particle is usually an adverb, but sometimes it can be a direct object or adjective instead. The particle is stressed more strongly than the main verb, which distinguishes separable verbs from prefixed verbs in pronunciation. The main verb of a separable verb is conjugated like it otherwise would, and can be basic (with ge- in the past participle) or prefixed (without ge-).

The particle is treated syntactically as a separate verb, and is placed before or after the main verb as syntax dictates:

- When the V2 rule is in effect (in main clauses with a finite verb), the particle is placed after the main verb and separated from it with a space. It can also be separated from it by other words, just like in a sentence with multiple distinct verbs.
- When the V2 rule is not applied (in subordinate clauses or with a non-finite verb), the particle is placed directly before the main verb and is attached to it without a space.

The following table shows some examples of this in practice (the hyphens serve to highlight the various verb parts, but are not part of the official orthography for these verbs):

Infinitive	With V2	Without V2 (subordinate clause)	Without V2 (non-finite verb)
om‧vallen ("to fall over") basic main verb, strong class 7	Ik val om. I fall over.	Hij ziet niet dat ik om‧val. He doesn't see that I fall over.	Ik ben om‧ge‧vallen. I have fallen over.
uit‧komen ("to come true") basic main verb, strong class 4	Mijn wens kwam vandaag uit. My wish came true today.	Het is ongelooflijk dat mijn wens vandaag uit‧kwam. It is unbelievable that my wish came true today.	Mijn wens is vandaag uit‧ge‧komen. My wish has come true today.
uit‧betalen ("to pay out") prefixed main verb, weak in -d	Gisteren betaalde zij het geld uit. Yesterday she paid out the money.	Ik weet niet of zij het geld gisteren uit‧betaalde. I don't know if she paid out the money yesterday.	Zij heeft het geld uit‧betaald. She has paid out the money.

== Forms and endings ==
Dutch verbs conjugate for tense in present and past, and for mood in indicative, subjunctive and imperative. The subjunctive mood in Dutch is archaic or formal, and is rarely used. There are two grammatical numbers (singular and plural) and three grammatical persons. However, many forms are identical to others, so the conjugation does not have distinct forms for all possible combinations of these factors (that is, there is considerable syncretism). In particular, there is always just one form for the plural, and only in the present indicative is there a clear distinction among the different singular persons.

Each second-person pronoun may have its own form. The following can be distinguished:

- singular informal jij
- singular and plural formal u
- singular and plural southern gij
- plural informal jullie

All regular verbs, whether weak, strong or mixed, form the present tense in the same way. This also includes the infinitive and present participle. Only the formation of the past tense differs among regular verbs, depending on whether the verb is strong, weak or mixed. The endings are as follows:

Infinitive		-en		
Mood	Person	Present	Weak past	Strong past
Indicative	1st sg ik	–	-de, -te	–
Indicative	2nd sg jij	-t^{1 2}	-de, -te	–
Indicative	2nd sg+pl gij	-t^{1}	-de(t), -te(t)^{3}	-t^{1 3}
Indicative	2nd sg+pl u	-t^{1}	-de, -te	–
Indicative	3rd sg hij, zij, het	-t^{1}	-de, -te	–
Indicative	pl wij, jullie, zij	-en	-den, -ten	-en
Subjunctive	ik jij, gij, u hij, zij, het	-e	-de, -te	-e
Subjunctive	pl wij, jullie, zij	-en^{5}	-den, -ten	-en
Imperative	General	–		
Imperative	Plural	-t^{1}		
Participles		-end	(ge-) -d, (ge-) -t^{1 4}	(ge-) -en^{4}

Notes:

1. When the stem of a verb ends in -t already, the ending -t is not added on: apart from a few exceptions (putt, watt, etc.) a word cannot end in -tt. Similarly, when the stem ends in -d the additional -d in the weak past participle is not added.
2. When the second-person jij-form is followed immediately by the subject pronoun itself (jij or je), the verb does not end in -t: Jij werkt → Werk jij? ("You work" → "Do you work?"). With the verbs houden, rijden and verbs derived from them, the -d of the stem can be dropped if it is not followed by -t (e.g. hou jij van bloemen 'do you like flowers?'), which in a formal context is usually not done. The -t is added in all other cases, except when the verb stem already ends in t.
3. The additional -t of the second-person gij-form is optional in the past tense for weak verbs and is usually considered archaic. For strong verbs, the -t is always required, except when the stem ends in t, e.g. gij liet.
4. The prefix ge- of the past participle is not added when the verb is a prefixed verb. See above for more information.
5. In archaic language, the ending -t with jullie is also possible (and survives in Brabantian dialect), e.g. jullie loopt naar school 'you walk to school'.

All forms of a given regular verb can be predicted from just three forms, or sometimes four. These are the principal parts of a verb.

- The infinitive, which represents the present tense.
- The past singular, which represents the past tense (except the past participle).
- The past plural, for some strong verbs. Normally, the past plural can be predicted from the past singular, but in class 4 and 5 strong verbs, the past singular has a short vowel while it is long in the plural. The past subjunctive singular, and the past indicative second-person singular gij form have the same long vowel as the past plural, if it is distinct.
- The past participle, by itself.

In the sections that follow, only the principal parts of each verb are given when this is sufficient to describe the full conjugation of the verb.

== Present tense ==
As noted above, the present tense of all regular verbs is formed in the same way, and follows the same rules. The following table shows the conjugation of two verbs in the present tense:

Infinitive		vullen ("to fill")	leren ("to learn, to teach")
Indicative mood	1st sg ik	vul	leer
Indicative mood	2nd sg jij	vult	leert
Indicative mood	2nd sg+pl gij	vult	leert
Indicative mood	2nd sg+pl u	vult	leert
Indicative mood	3rd sg hij, zij, het	vult	leert
Indicative mood	pl wij, jullie, zij	vullen	leren
Subjunctive mood	ik jij, gij, u hij, zij, het	vulle	lere
Subjunctive mood	pl wij, jullie, zij	vullen	leren
Imperative mood	General	vul	leer
Imperative mood	Plural	vult	leert
Participle		vullend	lerend

If the stem ends in -v or -z, then these are spelled -f and -s at the end of a syllable.

Infinitive		leven ("to live")	blozen ("to blush")
Indicative mood	1st sg ik	leef	bloos
Indicative mood	2nd sg jij	leeft	bloost
Indicative mood	2nd sg+pl gij	leeft	bloost
Indicative mood	2nd sg+pl u	leeft	bloost
Indicative mood	3rd sg hij, zij, het	leeft	bloost
Indicative mood	pl wij, jullie, zij	leven	blozen
Subjunctive mood	ik jij, gij, u hij, zij, het	leve	bloze
Subjunctive mood	pl wij, jullie, zij	leven	blozen
Imperative mood	General	leef	bloos
Imperative mood	Plural	leeft	bloost
Participle		levend	blozend

If the stem ends in -t, then no additional -t ending is added when this would otherwise be required, as a word cannot end in a double consonant (-tt in this case) in Dutch spelling. This makes all present singular forms identical.

Infinitive		zetten ("to set, to place")
Indicative mood	ik jij, gij, u hij, zij, het	zet
Indicative mood	pl wij, jullie, zij	zetten
Subjunctive mood	ik jij, gij, u hij, zij, het	zette
Subjunctive mood	pl wij, jullie, zij	zetten
Imperative mood	All	zet
Participle		zettend

== Past tense ==
The past tense is formed differently depending on whether the verb is weak, strong or mixed.

=== Weak verbs ===
Weak verbs are the most common type of verb in Dutch, and the only productive type (all newly created verbs are weak, except most new formations with a strong-verb stem). They form their past tense with an ending containing a dental consonant, -d- or -t-.

Whether -d- or -t- is used depends on the final pronounced phoneme of the verb stem as it sounds in the infinitive verb form. If the stem ends in a voiceless consonant, then -t- is used, otherwise -d-. It is often summarised with the mnemonic "'t kofschip": if the verb stem ends with one of the consonants of 't kofschip (t, k, f, s, ch, p), then the past tense will have -t-. However, it also applies for c, q and x and any other letter that is voiceless in pronunciation.

The following tables show the past tense forms of a weak verb with a past tense in -d- (stem does not end in voiceless consonant), and with a past tense in -t- (stem ends in voiceless consonant).

Infinitive		vullen ("to fill")	werken ("to work")
Indicative mood	1st sg ik	vulde	werkte
Indicative mood	2nd sg jij	vulde	werkte
Indicative mood	2nd sg+pl gij	vulde(t)	werkte(t)
Indicative mood	2nd sg+pl u	vulde	werkte
Indicative mood	3rd sg hij, zij, het	vulde	werkte
Indicative mood	pl wij, jullie, zij	vulden	werkten
Subjunctive mood	ik jij, gij, u hij, zij, het	vulde	werkte
Subjunctive mood	pl wij, jullie, zij	vulden	werkten
Participle		gevuld	gewerkt

If the stem ends in -v or -z, then these are spelled -f and -s at the end of a syllable, as in the present tense. However, they are still pronounced as voiced /v/ and /z/ when the past tense ending is added, so the stem is still considered voiced, and the past tense-endings contain -d-:

- leven, leefde, geleefd ("to live")
- blozen, bloosde, gebloosd ("to blush")

If the stem ends in -d or -t, then no ending is added in the past participle, as a word cannot end in a double consonant (-dd or -tt in this case) in Dutch spelling, with few exceptions. The past tense stem will be pronounced the same as the present, but it is still spelled with -dd- or -tt-, even when the spelling rules would otherwise allow this to be simplified. Thus:

- baden, baadde, gebaad ("to bathe").
- redden, redde, gered ("to save, to rescue").
- praten, praatte, gepraat ("to talk").
- zetten, zette, gezet ("to set, to place").

Compare this to English set, which has a similar homophony between present and past.

Weak verbs with stems ending in a vowel sound also have past-tense forms with -d-:

- opspieën, spiede op, opgespied (“to fixate with pins”)
- sleeën, sleede, gesleed (“to sleigh”)
- keuen, keude, gekeud (“to cue”)

=== Strong verbs ===
Strong verbs form their past tenses by changing the vowel of the stem, a process known as ablaut. There are far fewer strong verbs than weak verbs in Dutch, but many of the most commonly used verbs are strong, so they are encountered frequently. There are about 200 strong roots, giving rise to about 1500 strong verbs in total, if all derived verbs with separable and inseparable prefixes are included.

Strong verbs use a different set of endings from weak verbs. However, the same rules for final -t, -v, -z apply.

Infinitive		schijnen ("to shine")	geven ("to give")	sluiten ("to close")
Indicative mood	1st sg ik	scheen	gaf	sloot
Indicative mood	2nd sg jij	scheen	gaf	sloot
Indicative mood	2nd sg+pl gij	scheent	gaaft	sloot
Indicative mood	2nd sg+pl u	scheen	gaf	sloot
Indicative mood	3rd sg hij, zij, het	scheen	gaf	sloot
Indicative mood	pl wij, jullie, zij	schenen	gaven	sloten
Subjunctive mood	ik jij, gij, u hij, zij, het	schene	gave	slote
Subjunctive mood	pl wij, jullie, zij	schenen	gaven	sloten
Participle		geschenen	gegeven	gesloten

The vowels that occur in present and past are not random, but follow clear patterns. These patterns can be divided into seven "classes", some with subgroups. Some verbs are a mixture of two classes or belong to none of the existing classes.

In the following subsections, the vowel patterns of each class are described. For clarity, long vowels are always written doubled in the patterns. In the actual conjugated verb, they will be single or double according to normal Dutch spelling rules.

==== Class 1 ====
Class 1 follows the vowel pattern ij-ee-ee:

- schijnen, scheen, geschenen ("to shine").
- blijven, bleef, gebleven ("to stay, to remain").

==== Class 2 ====
Class 2 is divided into two subclasses.

Class 2a follows the vowel pattern ie-oo-oo:

- bieden, bood, geboden ("to offer").
- schieten, schoot, geschoten ("to shoot").

Class 2b follows the vowel pattern ui-oo-oo:

- sluiten, sloot, gesloten ("to close").
- buigen, boog, gebogen ("to bend").

The verbs vriezen and verliezen show grammatischer Wechsel, with s/z changing to r in the past tense:

- vriezen, vroor, gevroren ("to freeze").
- verliezen, verloor, verloren ("to lose"; a prefixed verb, so no ge- in the past participle).

==== Class 3 ====
Class 3 is divided into two subclasses.

Class 3a follows the vowel pattern i-o-o:

- drinken, dronk, gedronken ("to drink").
- binden, bond, gebonden ("to bind").

The vowel is usually followed by m or n and another consonant.

Class 3b follows e-o-o:

- smelten, smolt, gesmolten ("to melt").
- vechten, vocht, gevochten ("to fight").

The vowel is usually followed by l or r and another consonant.

==== Class 4 ====
Class 4 follows the vowel pattern ee-a/aa-oo:

- stelen, stal/stalen, gestolen ("to steal").
- nemen, nam/namen, genomen ("to take").

The vowel in these verbs is usually followed by l, r, m or n and no other consonant.

The verb komen has an irregular pattern with short o in the present singular, long oo in the remaining present tense, and an additional w in the past:

- kom/komen, kwam/kwamen, gekomen ("to come").

==== Class 5 ====
Class 5 follows the vowel pattern ee-a/aa-ee, with the same change in length as in class 4:

- geven, gaf/gaven, gegeven ("to give").
- lezen, las/lazen, gelezen ("to read").

The vowel is usually followed by an obstruent consonant.

The verbs bidden, liggen and zitten follow the pattern i-a/aa-ee instead:

- bidden, bad/baden, gebeden ("to pray").
- liggen, lag/lagen, gelegen ("to lie (down)").
- zitten, zat/zaten, gezeten ("to sit").

These three verbs are descended from the old Germanic j-present verbs, which had an additional suffix -j- before the endings in the present tense. This suffix caused doubling of the preceding consonant (the West Germanic gemination) and changed the preceding vowel from e to i.

The verb eten is regular but has an extra -g- in the past participle:

- eten, at/aten, gegeten ("to eat").

Originally, it was simply geten, contracted from earlier ge‧eten. An additional ge- was added on later. Compare German essen, gegessen, which shows the same development.

==== Class 6 ====
Class 6 follows the vowel pattern aa-oe-aa. It is the smallest of the strong verb classes, with only a few verbs.

- graven, groef, gegraven ("to dig").
- dragen, droeg, gedragen ("to carry").

==== Class 7 ====
Class 7 follows the vowel pattern X-ie-X, where the two X's are identical. There were originally five subgroups depending on the vowel of the present tense. Class 7a (with ee or ei in the present) has disappeared in Dutch, so only four subgroups remain.

Class 7b has oo in the present tense:

- lopen, liep, gelopen ("to walk, to run").

Class 7c has a in the present tense:

- vallen, viel, gevallen ("to fall").

Two verbs have shortened the past tense vowel to i:

- hangen, hing, gehangen ("to hang").
- vangen, ving, gevangen ("to catch").

In present tense of the verb houden, the original combination -ald- underwent L-vocalization, and became -oud-.

- houden, hield, gehouden ("to hold, to keep").

It also has an alternative form which lacks -d when it occurs at the end: hou alongside the regular houd.

Class 7d has aa in the present tense:

- laten, liet, gelaten ("to let, to allow").

Class 7e has oe in the present tense:

- roepen, riep, geroepen ("to call").

==== Other strong verbs ====
Several strong verbs have vowel patterns that do not fit with any of the above types.

A number of class 3b strong verbs have replaced their original past tense vowel with the -ie- of class 7, creating a "hybrid" class. The past participle vowel o of class 3 remains.

- helpen, hielp, geholpen ("to help")
- sterven, stierf, gestorven ("to die")
- werpen, wierp, geworpen ("to throw")
- werven, wierf, geworven ("to recruit")
- zwerven, zwierf, gezworven ("to wander, to roam")

The verb worden also belonged to class 3b, but the past and present vowels appear to have been swapped:

- worden, werd, geworden ("to become").

Contrast this with German werden, which kept the older vowel.

Class 6 originally had three j-present verbs, like liggen of class 5. These verbs originally followed the pattern e-oe-aa. All three have changed this in one way or another in modern Dutch:

- heffen, hief, geheven ("to lift, to raise"). This now has a class 7 past, and its past participle vowel was changed to ee.
- scheppen, schiep, geschapen ("to create"). This now has a class 7 past.
- zweren, zwoer, gezworen ("to swear, (an oath)"). This kept its class 6 past, but replaced the past participle vowel with the oo of class 4.

Three verbs appear to follow a class 3b pattern, but have a long vowel instead of a short one:

- wegen, woog, gewogen ("to weigh"). Originally class 5.
- scheren, schoor, geschoren ("to shave, to shear"). Originally class 4.
- zweren, zwoor, gezworen ("to fester"). Originally class 4.

The verb uitscheiden is the only remaining class 7a verb, but it now has a class 1 past (note that ei and ij are pronounced the same):

- uitscheiden, scheed uit, uitgescheiden ("to excrete"; this is a separable verb).

Even the form scheed uit is falling out of use, and is being replaced with a weak past scheidde uit, making it a mixed verb.

=== Mixed verbs ===
Some verbs have a mixture of strong and weak forms. These are called "mixed verbs" and are relatively common in Dutch. Most mixed verbs are originally strong verbs that have replaced some strong forms with weak forms. However, a few were originally weak but have become strong by analogy.

The most common type of mixed verb has a weak past tense, but a strong past participle in -en. Most mixed verbs of this type have the same vowel in the present and in the past participle, and therefore appear to be original class 6 and 7 verbs. A few still have the older strong past as an archaic form.

Mixed verbs that originally had class 6 pasts:

- bakken, bakte, gebakken ("to bake").
- lachen, lachte, gelachen ("to laugh"). The strong past loech still exists, but is archaic.
- laden, laadde, geladen ("to load").
- malen, maalde, gemalen ("to grind").
- varen, vaarde, gevaren ("to fare"). The sense "to travel by boat" has a class 6 past voer.

Mixed verbs that originally had class 7 pasts:

- bannen, bande, gebannen ("to ban").
- brouwen, brouwde, gebrouwen ("to brew").
- houwen, houwde, gehouwen ("to hew"). The strong past hieuw still exists, but is archaic.
- raden, raadde, geraden ("to guess"). The strong past ried still exists.
- scheiden, scheidde, gescheiden ("to separate"). But note uitscheiden has the alternative past scheed uit.
- spannen, spande, gespannen ("to span, to stretch").
- stoten, stootte, gestoten ("to bump, to knock"). The strong past stiet still exists, but is archaic.
- vouwen, vouwde, gevouwen ("to fold"). From older vouden with loss of -d- as is common in Dutch; the past originally had -ield- like houden.
- wassen, waste, gewassen ("to wash"). The strong past wies still exists, but is archaic.
- zouten, zoutte, gezouten ("to salt"). The past originally had -ielt-, like houden.

Mixed verbs from other classes:

- barsten, barstte, gebarsten ("to burst, to crack"). Originally class 3; the older vowels e and o changed to a in standard Dutch, but are still found in some dialects.
- wreken, wreekte, gewroken ("to take revenge"). Originally class 4, like breken.
- weven, weefde, geweven ("to weave"). Originally class 5, like geven.

A smaller group of verbs, all belonging to class 6, has the reverse situation. The past tense is strong, but the past participle is weak.

- jagen, joeg, gejaagd ("to hunt"). The weak past jaagde also occurs.
- vragen, vroeg, gevraagd ("to ask"). The weak past vraagde also occurs, rarely.
- waaien, woei, gewaaid ("to blow (of the wind)"). The weak past waaide also occurs.

== Irregular verbs ==
The following verbs are very irregular, and may not fit neatly into the strong-weak split.

An important subset of these verbs are the preterite-present verbs, which are shared by all Germanic languages. In the present tense, they originally conjugated like the past tense of a strong verb. In Dutch, this means that they lack the -t in the third-person singular present indicative, much like their English equivalents which lack the -s. Their past tense forms are weak, but irregularly so. Most of these verbs have become auxiliary verbs, so they may be missing imperative forms, and perhaps the participles as well.

=== zijn ===
The verb zijn "to be" is suppletive, and uses a different root in the present and past. Its present tense is highly irregular, and the past shows grammatischer Wechsel like the strong verb vriezen (s/z becomes r). The subjunctive mood is generally considered archaic.

Infinitive		zijn, wezen (Note: Archaic), bennen (Note: South Holland colloquial) "to be"	
Mood	Person	Present	Past
Indicative	1st sg ik	ben	was
Indicative	2nd sg jij	bent	was
Indicative	2nd sg+pl gij	zijt	waart
Indicative	2nd sg+pl u	bent, is (Note: Dated form. Nowadays u bent is preferred.), zijt (rare)	was
Indicative	3rd sg hij, zij, het	is	was
Indicative	pl wij, jullie, zij	zijn (Note: The form jullie bent is dated. Nowadays jullie zijn is preferred.)	waren
Subjunctive	ik jij, gij, u hij, zij, het	zij, weze	ware
Subjunctive	pl wij, jullie, zij	zijn, wezen	waren
Imperative	General (Note: Please notice the less common imperative form weest u)	wees, zij (Note: Flemish regional form), ben (Note: Colloquial)	-
Imperative	Plural (Note: Please notice the less common imperative form wezen jullie.)	weest, zijt	-
Participles		zijnd, wezend	geweest

=== hebben ===
The verb hebben "to have" is weak in origin, but has many other irregularities.

Infinitive		hebben "to have"	
Mood	Person	Present	Past
Indicative	1st sg ik	heb	had
Indicative	2nd sg jij	hebt	had
Indicative	2nd sg+pl gij	hebt	hadt
Indicative	2nd sg+pl u	hebt, heeft	had
Indicative	3rd sg hij, zij, het	heeft	had
Indicative	pl wij, jullie, zij	hebben	hadden
Subjunctive	ik jij, gij, u hij, zij, het	hebbe	hadde
Subjunctive	pl wij, jullie, zij	hebben	hadden
Imperative	General	heb	-
Imperative	Plural	hebt	-
Participles		hebbend	gehad

=== weten ===
The verb weten is regular in the present. The past ends in -st.

Infinitive		weten "to know (have knowledge)"	
Mood	Person	Present	Past
Indicative	ik jij, gij, u hij, zij, het	weet	wist
Indicative	pl wij, jullie, zij	weten	wisten
Subjunctive	ik jij, gij, u hij, zij, het	wete	wiste
Subjunctive	pl wij, jullie, zij	weten	wisten
Imperative	All	weet	-
Participles		wetend	geweten

=== moeten ===
The verb moeten is very similar to weten.

Infinitive		moeten "must, to have to"	
Mood	Person	Present	Past
Indicative	ik jij, gij, u hij, zij, het	moet	moest
Indicative	pl wij, jullie, zij	moeten	moesten
Subjunctive	ik jij, gij, u hij, zij, het	moete	moeste
Subjunctive	pl wij, jullie, zij	moeten	moesten
Imperative	—		
Participles		moetend	gemoeten

=== mogen ===
The verb mogen is relatively regular. It has a vowel change in the present between singular and plural, reflecting the original vowel change between the singular and plural strong past. The past ends in -cht.

Infinitive		mogen "may, to be allowed"	
Mood	Person	Present	Past
Indicative	1st sg ik	mag	mocht
Indicative	2nd sg jij	mag	mocht
Indicative	2nd sg+pl gij	moogt	mocht
Indicative	2nd sg+pl u	mag	mocht
Indicative	3rd sg hij, zij, het	mag	mocht
Indicative	pl wij, jullie, zij	mogen	mochten
Subjunctive	ik jij, gij, u hij, zij, het	moge	mochte
Subjunctive	pl wij, jullie, zij	mogen	mochten
Imperative	—		
Participles		mogend	gemogen, gemoogd, gemocht

=== kunnen ===
The verb kunnen also has a vowel change in the present, and a variety of alternative forms. In the past tense, it has both a vowel change and, in the plural, the weak dental suffix. With 'u' and 'jij' both 'kunt' and 'kan' are possible. While 'kan' is usually used in speech, in writing 'kunt' is preferred in the Netherlands. 'Kan' is considered to be more informal.

Infinitive		kunnen "can, to be able"	
Mood	Person	Present	Past
Indicative	1st sg ik	kan	kon
Indicative	2nd sg jij	kunt, kan	kon
Indicative	2nd sg+pl gij	kunt	kondt
Indicative	2nd sg+pl u	kunt, kan	kon
Indicative	3rd sg hij, zij, het	kan	kon
Indicative	pl wij, jullie, zij	kunnen	konden
Subjunctive	ik jij, gij, u hij, zij, het	kunne	konde
Subjunctive	pl wij, jullie, zij	kunnen	konden
Imperative	—		
Participles		kunnende	gekund

=== zullen ===
The verb zullen is the most irregular of the preterite-presents. In the present, the forms strongly resemble those of kunnen. The past is different, and has changed earlier -old- to -oud-, and then dropped the -d- in many forms.

Like its English equivalent would, the past tense zou does not literally indicate past time. Instead, the distinction is one of certainty: the present indicates certain future time, while the past indicates a conditional event. Compare:

- Zonder eten zal ik niet kunnen slapen. "Without food, I will not be able to sleep." (The speaker knows this for sure.)
- Zonder eten zou ik niet kunnen slapen. "Without food, I would not be able to sleep." (The speaker expects this, hypothetically.)

Infinitive		zullen "will, shall, to be going to"	
Mood	Person	Present	Past
Indicative	1st sg ik	zal	zou
Indicative	2nd sg jij	zult, zal	zou
Indicative	2nd sg+pl gij	zult	zoudt
Indicative	2nd sg+pl u	zult, zal	zou
Indicative	3rd sg hij, zij, het	zal	zou
Indicative	pl wij, jullie, zij	zullen	zouden
Subjunctive	ik jij, gij, u hij, zij, het	zulle	zoude
Subjunctive	pl wij, jullie, zij	zullen	zouden
Imperative	—		
Participles		zullend	—

=== willen ===
The verb willen is not a preterite-present verb in origin, but nowadays it inflects much the same.

There are two different past tense forms. The original form wou(den) has a change of -old- to -oud-, like in zullen, but this form is now considered colloquial or dialectal. The newer, regular form wilde(n) is considered more standard.

Infinitive		willen "to want"	
Mood	Person	Present	Past
Indicative	1st sg ik	wil	wilde, wou
Indicative	2nd sg jij	wil(t)	wilde, wou
Indicative	2nd sg+pl gij	wilt	wilde(t), woudt
Indicative	2nd sg+pl u	wilt, wil	wilde, wou
Indicative	3rd sg hij, zij, het	wil	wilde, wou
Indicative	pl wij, jullie, zij	willen	wilden, wouden
Subjunctive	ik jij, gij, u hij, zij, het	wille	wilde, woude
Subjunctive	pl wij, jullie, zij	willen	wilden, wouden
Imperative	General	wil	-
Imperative	Plural	wilt	-
Participles		willend	gewild

=== Contracted vowel stems ===
A handful of common verbs have a stem ending in a vowel in the present tense. The endings contract with the stem, losing any -e- in the ending. The following table shows an example.

Infinitive		gaan ("to go")
Indicative mood	1st sg ik	ga
Indicative mood	2nd sg jij	ga(at)
Indicative mood	2nd sg+pl gij	gaat
Indicative mood	2nd sg+pl u	gaat
Indicative mood	3rd sg hij, zij, het	gaat
Indicative mood	pl wij, jullie, zij	gaan
Subjunctive mood	ik jij, gij, u hij, zij, het	ga
Subjunctive mood	pl wij, jullie, zij	gaan
Imperative mood	General	ga
Imperative mood	Plural	gaat
Present Participle		gaand
Past Participle		gegaan

The verbs have a variety of past tense forms, reflecting their differing origins:

- zien, zag/zagen, gezien ("to see"). This is a class 5 strong verb that originally had -h- in the stem, which disappeared. Grammatischer Wechsel occurred in the past.
- slaan, sloeg, geslagen ("to hit, to beat"). As zien, but class 6.
- doen, deed, gedaan ("to do, to put"). The past looks like it's weak, but actually shows the remnants of older reduplication.
- gaan, ging, gegaan ("to go"). The past comes from a different, extended form of the stem (gang-), which was class 7 like vangen and hangen.
- staan, stond, gestaan ("to stand"). The past comes from a different, extended form of the stem (stand-, like the English verb).

=== Weak verbs with past in -cht ===
A few verbs form their past irregularly because of an early Germanic development called the "Germanic spirant law". Both the vowel and the consonant change, sometimes in rather unexpected ways. However, these verbs are still weak even though the vowel changes, because the past tense and participle have a dental suffix (-t-). The vowel change is not caused by ablaut (which is the origin of the vowel changes in strong verbs), but by an entirely different phenomenon called Rückumlaut.

Six verbs have this type of conjugation. Note that their English equivalents often have similar changes.

- brengen, bracht/brachten, gebracht ("to bring").
- denken, dacht/dachten, gedacht ("to think").
- dunken, docht/dochten, gedocht ("to seem, to be considered"). The irregular past is rare and archaic, the regular weak dunkte is more common.
- kopen, kocht/kochten, gekocht ("to buy"). In this case the -cht is from earlier -ft (a regular change in Dutch).
- plegen, placht/plachten, geplogen/geplacht ("to do habitually"). Rarely used.
- zoeken, zocht/zochten, gezocht ("to seek, to look for")

=== zeggen ===
The verb zeggen ("to say") is weak, but is often conjugated irregularly in the past. There is also a regular conjugation, which is more common in the south. In some dialects, a similar conjugation is followed for leggen ("to lay").

- Irregular: zeggen, zei/zeiden, gezegd. The irregular gij- form of the past is zeidt.
- Regular: zeggen, zegde/zegden, gezegd. The regular gij- form of the past is zegde(t).

Infinitive		zeggen "to say"	
Mood	Person	Present	Past
Indicative	1st sg ik	zeg	zei, zegde
Indicative	2nd sg jij	zeg(t)	zei, zegde
Indicative	2nd sg+pl gij	zegt	zeidt, zegde(t)
Indicative	2nd sg+pl u	zegt	zei, zegde
Indicative	3rd sg hij, zij, het	zegt	zei, zegde
Indicative	pl wij, jullie, zij	zeggen	zeiden, zegden
Subjunctive	ik jij, gij, u hij, zij, het	zegge	zeide, zegde
Subjunctive	pl wij, jullie, zij	zeggen	zeiden, zegden
Imperative	General	zeg	
Imperative	Plural	zegt	
Participles		zeggend	gezegd
