= Nominal TAM =

Nominal TAM is the indication of tense–aspect–mood by inflecting a noun, rather than a verb. In clausal nominal TAM, the noun indicates TAM information about the clause (as opposed to the noun phrase).

Whether or not a particular language can best be understood as having clausal nominal TAM can be controversial, and there are various borderline cases. A language that can indicate tense by attaching a verbal clitic to a noun (such as the -'ll clitic in English) is not generally regarded as using nominal TAM.

== Examples ==
=== Clausal nominal TAM ===
Various languages have been shown to have clausal nominal TAM. In the Niger-Congo language Supyire, the form of the first person and second pronouns reflects whether the clause has declarative or non-declarative mood. In the Gǀwi language of Botswana, subject pronouns reflect the imperative or non-imperative mood of the clause (while the verb itself does not). In the Chamicuro language of Peru, the definite article accompanying the subject or object of a clause indicates either past or non-past tense. In the Pitta Pitta language of Australia, the mandatory case marking system differs depending on the tense of the clause. Other languages exhibiting clausal nominal TAM include Lardil (Australia), Gurnu (Australia), Yag Dii (Cameroon), Sahidic Coptic (Egypt), Gusiilay (Niger-Congo), Iai (Oceania), Tigak (Oceania), and Guaymi (Panama and Costa Rica).

=== Non-clausal nominal TAM ===
In the Guarani language of Paraguay, nouns can optionally take several different past and future markers to express ideas such as "our old house (the one we no longer live in)", "the abandoned car", "what was once a bridge", "bride-to-be" or even "my ex-future-wife," or rather, "the woman who at one point was going to be my wife."

== Related grammatical phenomena ==
=== Verbal clitics ===
Although verbal clitics such as -'ll in English are attached to nouns and indicate TAM information, they are not really examples of nominal TAM because they are clitics rather than inflections and therefore not part of the noun at all. This is easily seen in sentences where the clitic is attached to another part of speech, such as "The one you want'll be in the shed".

Another way to tell the difference is to consider the following hypothetical dialogue:

- "I thought you said that she read the book."
- "No, I said she will read the book." [as opposed to] "No, I said she'll read the book." [wrong in this context]

The speaker cannot emphasise the future time by placing voice stress on she'll, and so instead uses the expanded phrase she will. This is characteristic of clitics as opposed to inflections (i.e. clitics cannot be emphasised by placing voice stress on the word to which they are attached).

The significance of this can be seen by comparison with a second hypothetical dialogue, using the English negative suffix -n't (which is best understood as an inflection rather than a clitic):

- "I thought you said that it is a good book."
- "No, I said it is not a good book." [or] "No, I said it isn't a good book." [equally correct]

In this case the speaker could choose to say isn't rather than is not. Even though the stress then falls on the syllable IS, the meaning of the sentence is understood as emphasising the NOT. This indicates that isn't is one inflected word rather than a word with a clitic attached.
