= Subjunctive in Dutch =

Verb mood

The subjunctive in Dutch is a verb mood typically used in dependent clauses to express a wish, command, emotion, possibility, uncertainty, doubt, judgment, opinion, necessity, or action that has not yet occurred.

It is also referred to as the conjunctive mood (Dutch: aanvoegende wijs) as it often follows a conjunction. As in English the subjunctive mood in Dutch has gradually been replaced by modal auxiliary verbs. As a consequence of this, its contemporary use is mostly—but not completely—confined to set phrases and semi-fixed expressions. Readers of older Dutch texts frequently encounter the use of the subjunctive, especially in legal, judicial, literary and religious texts.

== Formation ==
=== Present subjunctive ===
Onvoltooid Tegenwoordige Tijd (OTT), imperfect present tense:

- First person: present root + e (ik kome) or if the root ends on a vowel: root (ik ga)
- Second person: present root +et or root +e: gij nemet', zij je, u lette
- Third person: present root +e: hij spele
- Plural: present infinitive: wij mogen
- VTT: OTT of hebben or zijn + past participle: ik hebbe gespeeld, u zij gegaan.

=== Past subjunctive ===
Onvoltooid Verleden Tijd (OVT), imperfect past tense:

- First person: past root + e: Ik kwame.
- Third person: past root + e: Hij speelde.
- Plural: past infinitive: Wij mochten.
- One exception: the past subjunctive of the Dutch verb worden ('to become') is wierde(n), not werde(n).
- VVT: OVT of hebben ('to have') or zijn ('to be') + past participle: Ik hadde gespeeld, gij waret gegaan.

=== Future subjunctive ===
The future subjunctive is mostly a theoretical construct, which has almost never been used.

- OTkT (imperfect future tense): OTT of zullen + present infinitive: ik zulle spelen.
- OVTkT (imperfect past future tense): OVT of zullen + present infinitive: ik zoude spelen.
- VTkT (perfect future tense): OTkT of hebben or zijn + past participle: Ik zulle gespeeld hebben, gij zullet gegaan zijn.
- VVTkT (perfect past future tense): OVTkT of hebben or zijn + past participle: Ik zoude gespeeld hebben, gij zoudet gegaan zijn.

== Usage ==
In Dutch, the subjunctive mood can express a

- wish: hence, it fulfills the function of the optative mood (wensende wijs) in other languages.
- command
- condition: hence, it fulfills the function of the conditional mood (voorwaardelijke wijs) in other languages.
- irreality: hence, it fulfills the function of the irrealis mood in other languages.
- possibility: potentialis
- doubt
- uncertainty
- concession
- purpose
- exhortation: it fulfills the function of the hortative mood in other languages.

The subjunctive was quite common in the past, and is often encountered in older Dutch texts. It underwent a slow but steady decline in use, first in the spoken language and later in the written language. It was already noted by linguists in the early 20th century that the use of the subjunctive in oral language was rare. By that time the use of the subjunctive in writing was also dwindling, a process that continued throughout the 20th century.

If the subjunctive is used in accordance with the rules mentioned in this article, it is still considered grammatically correct but often sounds archaic or formal. In contemporary Dutch the subjunctive is no longer actively used, save for a few exceptions and a large range of set phrases. Instead the function of the subjunctive has been replaced by a range of auxiliary verbs, the most important of which is zullen ('will'), especially its past tense: zouden ('would').

=== Command or wish ===
The subjunctive can express a wish or command. As such the subjunctive fulfills the function of what is known as the optative mood in some other languages. Example sentences:

- Lang leve de koningin! ('Long live the queen!')
- Mogen zij in vrede rusten. ('May they rest in peace.')
- Het ga je goed! ('May things go well for you!')
- God zegene en beware je. ('May God bless and save you.')
- Het geluk zij met u! ('May luck be with you!')
- Hiermede moge ik u berichten dat wij uw brief goed hebben ontvangen. ('I may inform you that we have received your letter.')
- Ware hij toch verstandiger geweest! ('I wish he had been wiser!')

In contemporary Dutch, the optative function of the subjunctive has to a large extent been replaced by the auxiliary verb zullen ('will') and to a much lesser extent by laten ('to let'). Example sentences: Ik hoop dat hij op tijd zal komen. (I hope he will come on time) and Laat Uw Naam geheiligd worden. ('Let Thy Name be hallowed', instead of Geheiligd zij Uw Naam or 'Hallowed be Thy Name'). In addition, wishes (especially toasts) are sometimes expressed using elliptical clauses introduced by dat ('that'), often combined with the modal verb mogen ('may'), as in Dat je nog veel mooie avonturen mag beleven! ('That you may have many more beautiful adventures'). Many religious texts and official government or business letters still make use of the optative subjunctive.

=== Exhortation ===
The subjunctive can express an exhortation. This form is archaic and is usually expressed in modern Dutch with the auxiliary verb moeten ('must' or 'should') or the imperative is used. Exceptions may be found in cookbook recipe formulas, normally in combination with the third person form men ('one' or 'you').

- Men neme drie eieren. ('You should take three eggs.')
- De lezer bedenke wel dat dit boek vijftig jaar geleden geschreven is./Modern Dutch: De lezer moet wel bedenken dat dit boek vijftig jaar geleden geschreven is. ('The reader should keep in mind that this book was written fifty years ago.')
- Men zegge het voort./Modern Dutch: Zeg(t) het voort. ('One should tell others.')
- Men herleze mijn brief./Modern Dutch: Men moet mijn brief herlezen. ('One should reread my letter.')
- De gebruiker lette hierop./Modern Dutch: De gebruiker moet hierop letten. ('The user should take note of this.')

=== Irreality ===
The subjunctive can be used to express an irrealis situation. Example sentences:

- De man sprak over de bankoverval als ware het een zondaguitstapje. ('The man spoke about the bank robbery as if it were a Sunday trip.')

=== Concession ===
The subjunctive can express a concession. Example sentences:

- Wie hij ook zij. ('Whoever he may be.')
- Wat hij ook moge doen. ('Whatever he may do.')
- Hoe het ook zij. ('However it may be.')
- Ik ben het met zijn standpunten eens, zij het niet geheel van harte. ('I agree with his views, though not wholeheartedly.')

== Set phrases ==
In contemporary Dutch, a wide range of fixed expressions that make use of the subjunctive exist. Some examples are mentioned here.

=== Proverbs ===
Some examples:

- Gebeure wat gebeuren zal. ('What will be, will be.')
- Kome wat komen zal. ('Come what may...')
- Koste wat het kost. ('Cost what it will...')
- Redde wie zich redden kan. ('Every one for oneself' [lit. 'Be saved who can save oneself'])

=== Formal and religious language ===
Some examples:

- Lord's Prayer: Onze Vader Die in de Hemelen zijt, geheiligd zij Uw Naam, Uw Rijk kome, Uw Wil geschiede op aarde als in de Hemel. ('Our Father in heaven, hallowed be your name, your kingdom come, your will be done, on earth as in heaven.')
- Oath phrase: Zo waarlijk helpe mij God almachtig. ('So help me God,' as used in swearing an oath.)
- Formal request: Gelieve gepast te betalen. from U gelieve gepast te betalen. ('Please pay with exact change.')

== Set words ==
In some words, the use of the subjunctive can be seen:

- Dankzij from dank zij ('thanks to')
- Hetzij from het zij ('be it', either)
- Tenzij from 't en zij (lit. 'it not be', unless)
- Godbetert from God betere het. ('(I wish that) God improve it')
- Godverdomme from God verdoeme (het) ('(I wish that) Goddamn (it)')
- Godzijdank from God zij dank. ('God be thanked')

The composite words can also be split in their components and form a full-fledged sentence.

== See also ==
- Grammatical mood
- Subjunctive in English
- Archaic Dutch declension
