= 't kofschip =

Mnemonic for Dutch language

The 't kofschip (Dutch pronunciation: [ət ˈkɔfsxɪp], the merchant-ship), 't fokschaap (the breeding sheep), also often referred to as kofschiptaxi or soft ketchup (among foreign language learners), rule is a mnemonic that determines the endings of a regular Dutch verb in the past indicative/subjunctive and the ending of the past participle.

== Rule ==
The rule goes as follows:

If the verb-root of a weak verb ends in one of the consonants of 't kofschip, being ⟨t⟩, ⟨k⟩, ⟨f⟩, ⟨s⟩, ⟨ch⟩, and ⟨p⟩, the past tense ends in -te(n) and the past participle (voltooid deelwoord) in -t. If the verb-root ends in any other consonant or in a vowel, the past tense ends in -de(n) and the past participle in -d.

For example:

Infinitive	Verb root	Past tense	Past participle
rusten "to rest"	rust-	rustte(n)	gerust
werken "to work"	werk-	werkte(n)	gewerkt
kloppen "to knock"	klop-	klopte(n)	geklopt
landen "to land"	land-	landde(n)	geland
legen "to empty"	leeg-	leegde(n)	geleegd
redden "to save"	red-	redde(n)	gered
spelen "to play"	speel-	speelde(n)	gespeeld
leren "to learn/teach"	leer-	leerde(n)	geleerd
proeven "to taste"	proev-	proefde(n)	geproefd
blozen "to blush"	blooz-	bloosde(n)	gebloosd
bingoën "to play bingo"	bingoo-	bingode(n)	gebingood

Because of the idiosyncrasies of Dutch spelling, some forms are spelled in unexpected ways. The past tense forms of proeven and blozen are written with f and s, as Dutch spelling rules permit the letters v and z only at the beginning of a syllable; however the pronunciation remains /v/ and /z/. Words may not end in a double consonant, so the past participles gerust, geland and gered do not get an additional -d. See Dutch orthography for more information.

Because of regular final-obstruent devoicing, the past participle ending is pronounced with a voiceless /t/ even though d is spelled. When the participle is inflected (in accordance with a following noun), the devoicing is undone, like in other words. Thus geland /ɣəˈlɑnt/, geleegd /ɣəˈleːxt/, geproefd /ɣəˈpruft/ inflect to gelande /ɣəˈlɑndə/, geleegde /ɣəˈleːɣdə/, geproefde /ɣəˈpruvdə/ respectively.

== Further details ==
On a phonological level, the rule is a form of voicing assimilation: the consonant of the past-tense ending takes on the voicing of whatever sound precedes it. Thus, the endings beginning with voiceless -t- are used after voiceless consonants, while the endings beginning with voiced -d- are used after voiced consonants and vowels (which are always voiced). Similar rules appear in several other Germanic languages, such as Swedish and English. In English, the rule is not usually reflected in spelling, but is still regular in pronunciation: compare raced /ɹeɪst/ and razed /ɹeɪzd/.

Because the rule is intended only as an educational tool, it only covers the basic Dutch vocabulary which consists mostly of native Germanic verbs. It cannot be applied to verbs with "new" phonemes such as /ʃ/ and /ʒ/, nor to foreign words whose spelling was not completely adapted to Dutch spelling. It also cannot be used for initialisms. In these cases, only the underlying voicing of the pronounced final consonant can be used to determine the ending. For example:

Infinitive	Inf. pronunc.	Verb root	Past tense	Past pronunc.	Past participle	Past ptc. pronunc.
faxen "to fax"	/ˈfɑksə(n)/	fax-	faxte(n)	/ˈfɑkstə(n)/	gefaxt	/ɣəˈfɑkst/
timen "to time"	/ˈtɑimə(n)/	time-	timede(n)	/ˈtɑimdə(n)/	getimed	/ɣəˈtɑimt/
racen "to race"	/ˈreːsə(n)/	race-	racete(n)	/ˈreːstə(n)/	geracet	/ɣəˈreːst/
deleten "to delete"	/diˈliːtə(n)/	delete-	deletete(n)	/diˈliːtə(n)/	gedeletet	/ɣədiˈliːt/
roetsjen "to whizz"	/ˈrutʃə(n)/	roetsj-	roetsjte(n)	/ˈrutʃtə(n)/	geroetsjt	/ɣəˈrutʃt/
crashen "to crash"	/ˈkrɛʃə(n)/	crash-	crashte(n)	/ˈkrɛʃtə(n)/	gecrasht	/ɣəˈkrɛʃt/
managen "to manage"	/ˈmɛnədʒə(n)/	manage-	managede(n)	/ˈmɛnədʒdə(n)/	gemanaged	/ɣəˈmɛnətʃt/
petanquen "to play pétanque"	/peːˈtɑŋkə(n)/	petanque-	petanquete(n)	/peːˈtɑŋktə(n)/	gepetanquet	/ɣəpeːˈtɑŋkt/
sms'en "to send a text message"	/ɛsɛmˈɛsə(n)/	sms'-	sms'te(n)	/ɛsɛmˈɛstə(n)/	ge-sms't	/ɣə(ʔ)ɛsɛmˈɛst/
gsm'en "to phone using a mobile phone"	/ɣeːɛsˈɛmə(n)/	gsm'-	gsm'de(n)	/ɣeːɛsˈɛmdə(n)/	ge-gsm'd	/ɣəɣeːɛsˈɛmt/
cc'en "to CC (an email)"	/seːˈseːə(n)/	cc'-	cc'de(n)	/seːˈseːdə(n)/	ge-cc'd	/ɣəseːˈseːt/
