= V2 word order =

Word order common in Germanic languages

In syntax, verb-second (V2) word order is a sentence structure in which the finite verb of a sentence or a clause is placed in the clause's second position, so that the verb is preceded by a single word or group of words (a single constituent).

Examples of V2 in English include (brackets indicating a single constituent):

- "Neither do I", "[Never in my life] have I seen such things"

If English used V2 in all situations, then it would feature such sentences as:

- "*[In school] learned I about animals", "*[When she comes home from work] takes she a nap"

V2 word order is common in the Germanic languages and is also found in Northeast Caucasian Ingush, Uto-Aztecan O'odham, and fragmentarily across Rhaeto-Romance varieties and Finno-Ugric Estonian. Of the Germanic family, English is exceptional in having predominantly SVO order instead of V2, although there are vestiges of the V2 phenomenon.

Most Germanic languages do not normally use V2 order in embedded clauses, with a few exceptions. In particular, German, Dutch, and Afrikaans revert to VF (verb final) word order after a complementizer; Yiddish and Icelandic do, however, allow V2 in all declarative clauses: main, embedded, and subordinate. Kashmiri (an Indo-Aryan language) has V2 in 'declarative content clauses' but VF order in relative clauses.

== Examples ==
The example sentences in (1) from German illustrate the V2 principle, which allows any constituent to occupy the first position as long as the second position is occupied by the finite verb. Sentences (1a) through to (1d) have the finite verb spielten 'played' in second position, with various constituents occupying the first position: in (1a) the subject is in first position; in (1b) the object is; in (1c) the temporal modifier is in first position; and in (1d) the locative modifier is in first position.

Die Kinder spielten vor der Schule im Park Fußball.
The-NOM-PL child-NOM-PL play-PRET-3PL before the-DAT-SG school-DAT-SG {in the-DAT-SG} park-DAT-SG football/soccer-ACC-SG.
The children played football/soccer in the park before school.

Fußball spielten die Kinder vor der Schule im Park.
Football/soccer-ACC-SG play-PRET-3PL the-NOM-PL child-NOM-PL before the-DAT-SG school-DAT-SG {in the-DAT-SG} park-DAT-SG.
The children played football/soccer in the park before school.

Vor der Schule spielten die Kinder im Park Fußball.
Before the-DAT-SG school-DAT-SG play-PRET-3PL the-NOM-PL child-NOM-PL {in the-DAT-SG} park-DAT-SG football/soccer-ACC-SG.
The children played football/soccer in the park before school.

Im Park spielten die Kinder vor der Schule Fußball.
{In the-DAT-SG} park-DAT-SG play-PRET-3PL the-NOM-PL child-NOM-PL before {} school-DAT-SG football/soccer-ACC-SG.
The children played football/soccer in the park before school.

In this example, English is more straightforward to compare to a North Germanic language: The same inversions occur regularly in the North Germanic languages, and in Dutch, for that matter, but English uses the North Germanic word order apart from having lost the inversions in common use. If the same example in Norwegian were translated to English with the inversions intact:

Barna spilte fotball i parken før skoletid.
child-DEF-PL play-PRET football/soccer in park-DEF-SG before schooltime-SG.
The children played football/soccer in the park before schooltime.

Fotball spilte barna i parken før skoletid.
football/soccer play-PRET child-DEF-PL in park-DEF-SG before schooltime-SG.
Football/soccer played the children in the park before schooltime.

Før skoletid spilte barna fotball i parken.
Before schooltime play-PRET child-DEF-PL football/soccer in park-DEF-SG.
Before schooltime played the children football/soccer in the park.

I parken spilte barna fotball før skoletid.
in park-DEF-SG play-PRET child-DEF-PL football/soccer before schooltime.
In the park played the children football/soccer before schooltime.

The caveat here (unlike in German) is that in languages without grammatical case, the form with the object first (2b) can only be used unambiguously when the object is unmistakable from the subject, such as if it is a personal pronoun, or as in this example, cannot meaningfully be the subject. In speech, such inversions are usually marked with emphasis: Apart from inversions that are obligatory in their grammatical context, such as "jeg tenker, derfor er jeg" (I think, therefore am I), when an inversion occurs for no other reason than emphasis, which is what opens up for possible ambiguity, the word in the emphasized position before the verb is usually also emphasized in speech.

== Non-finite verbs and embedded clauses ==
=== Non-finite verbs ===
The V2 principle regulates the position of finite verbs only; its influence on non-finite verbs (infinitives, participles, etc.) is indirect. Non-finite verbs in V2 languages appear in varying positions depending on the language. In German and Dutch, for instance, non-finite verbs appear after the object (if one is present) in clause final position in main clauses (OV order). Swedish and Icelandic, in contrast, position non-finite verbs after the finite verb but before the object (if one is present) (VO order). That is, V2 operates on only the finite verb.

=== Embedded clauses ===
(In the following examples, finite verb forms are in bold, non-finite verb forms are in italics and subjects are underlined.)

Germanic languages vary in the application of V2 order in embedded clauses. They fall into three groups.

==== Swedish, Danish, Norwegian, Faroese ====
In these languages, the word order of clauses is generally fixed in two patterns of conventionally numbered positions. Both end with positions for (5) non-finite verb forms, (6) objects, and (7), adverbials.

In main clauses, the V2 constraint holds. The finite verb must be in position (2) and sentence adverbs in position (4). The latter include words with meanings such as 'not' and 'always'. The subject may be position (1), but when a topical expression occupies the position, the subject is in position (3).

In embedded clauses, the V2 constraint is absent. After the conjunction, the subject must immediately follow; it cannot be replaced by a topical expression. Thus, the first four positions are in the fixed order (1) conjunction, (2) subject, (3) sentence adverb, (4) finite verb.

The position of the sentence adverbs is important to those theorists who see them as marking the start of a large constituent within the clause. Thus the finite verb is seen as inside that constituent in embedded clauses, but outside that constituent in V2 main clauses.

Swedish

main clause embedded clause		**Front** —	**Finite verb** **Conjunction**	**Subject**; **Subject**	**Sentence adverb** **Sentence adverb**	— **Finite verb**	**Non-finite verb** **Non-finite verb**	**Object**; **Object**	**Adverbial**; **Adverbial**
main clause	a.	I dag	**ville**	Lotte	inte		läsa	tidningen
		1	2	3	4		5	6
		today	wanted	Lotte	not		read	the newspaper		...
		'Lotte didn't want to read the paper today.'
embedded clause	b.		att	Lotte	inte	**ville**	koka	kaffe	i dag
			1	2	3	4	5	6	7
			that	Lotte	not	wanted	brew	coffee	today	...
		'that Lotte didn't want to make coffee today'

Main clause           Front    Finite verb    Subject    Sentence adverb    __            Non-finite verb     Object           Adverbial
Embedded clause       __       Conjunction    Subject    Sentence adverb    Finite verb   Non-finite verb     Object           Adverbial

Main clause      (a)  I dag    ville          Lotte      inte                             läsa                tidningen
                      today    wanted         Lotte      not                              read                the newspaper
                      "Lotte didn't want to read the paper today."


Embedded clause  (b)           att            Lotte      inte               ville         koka                kaffe             i dag
                               that           Lotte      not                wanted        brew                coffee            today
                      "that Lotte didn't want to make coffee today."

Danish

main clause embedded clause		**Front** —	**Finite verb** **Conjunction**	**Subject**; **Subject**	**Sentence adverb** **Sentence adverb**	— **Finite verb**	**Non-finite verb** **Non-finite verb**	**Object**; **Object**	**Adverbial**; **Adverbial**
main clause	a.	Klaus	**er**		ikke		kommet
		1	2		4		5
		Klaus	is		not		come
		...'Klaus hasn't come.'
embedded clause	b.		når	Klaus	ikke	**er**	kommet
			1	2	3	4	5
			when	Klaus	not	is	come
		...'when Klaus hasn't come'

So-called Perkerdansk is an example of a variety that does not follow the above.

Norwegian
(with multiple adverbials and multiple non-finite forms, in two varieties of the language)

main embedded		**Front** —	**Finite verb** **Conjunction**	**Subject**; **Subject**	**Sentence adverb** **Sentence adverb**	— **Finite verb**	**Non-finite verb** **Non-finite verb**	**Object**; **Object**	**Adverbial**; **Adverbial**
main clause	a.	Den gangen	**hadde**	han	dessverre ikke		villet sende	sakspapirene	før møtet.		(Bokmål variety)
		1	2	3	4		5	6	7
		that time	had	he	unfortunately not		wanted to send	the documents	before the meeting	...
		'This time he had unfortunately not wanted to send the documents before the meeting.'
embedded clause	b.		av di	han	denne gongen diverre ikkje	**hadde**	vilja senda	sakspapira	føre møtet.		(Nynorsk variety)
			1	2	3	4	5	6	7
			because	he	this time unfortunately not	had	wanted to send	the documents	before the meeting	...
		'because this time he had unfortunately not wanted to send the documents before the meeting.'

Faroese
Unlike continental Scandinavian languages, the sentence adverb may either precede or follow the finite verb in embedded clauses. A (3a) slot is inserted here for the following sentence adverb alternative.

main clause embedded clause		**Front** —	**Finite verb** **Conjunction**	**Subject**; **Subject**	**Sentence adverb** **Sentence adverb**	— **Finite verb**	— **Sentence adverb**	**Non-finite verb** **Non-finite verb**	**Object**; **Object**	**Adverbial**; **Adverbial**
main clause	a.	Her	**man**	fólk	ongantíð			hava fingið	fisk	fyrr
		1	2	3	4			5	6	7
		here	must	people	never			have caught	fish	before	...
		'People have surely never caught fish here before.'
embedded clause	b.		hóast	fólk	ongantíð	**hevur**		fingið	fisk	her
			1	2	3	4		5	6	7
			although	people	never	have		caught	fish	here
	c.		hóast	fólk		**hevur**	ongantíð	fingið	fisk	her
			1	2		4	(3a)	5	6	7
			although	people		have	never	caught	fish	here	...
		'although people have never caught fish here'

==== German ====
In main clauses, the V2 constraint holds. As with other Germanic languages, the finite verb must be in the second position. However, any non-finite forms must be in final position. The subject may be in the first position, but when a topical expression occupies the position, the subject follows the finite verb.

In embedded clauses, the V2 constraint does not hold. The finite verb form must be adjacent to any non-finite at the end of the clause.

German grammarians traditionally divide sentences into fields. Subordinate clauses preceding the main clause are said to be in the first field (Vorfeld), clauses following the main clause in the final field (Nachfeld).
The central field (Mittelfeld) contains most or all of a clause, and is bounded by left bracket (Linke Satzklammer) and right bracket (Rechte Satzklammer) positions.

In main clauses, the initial element (subject or topical expression) is said to be located in the first field, the V2 finite verb form in the left bracket, and any non-finite verb forms in the right bracket.
In embedded clauses, the conjunction is said to be located in the left bracket, and the verb forms in the right bracket. In German embedded clauses, a finite verb form follows any non-finite forms.

Examples

**First field**	**Left bracket**	**Central field**	**Right bracket**
Main clause	a.	Er	**hat**	dich	gestern	nicht	angerufen
he	has	you	yesterday	not	rung
... 'He didn't ring you yesterday because he didn't want to disturb you.'
b.	Sobald er Zeit hat	**wird**	er	dich	anrufen
As soon as he has time	will	he	you	ring
...'When he has time he will ring you.'
Embedded clause	c.	dass	er	dich	gestern	nicht	angerufen **hat**
that	he	you	yesterday	not	rung has
...'that he didn't ring you yesterday'

**Final field**
weil er dich nicht stören wollte.

==== Dutch and Afrikaans ====
V2 word order is used in main clauses; the finite verb must be in the second position. However, in subordinate clauses two word orders are possible for the verb clusters.

Main clauses:

Dutch

**First field**	**Left bracket**	**Central field**
Main clause	a.	De Māori	**hebben**	Nieuw-Zeeland
The Māori	have	New Zealand
...'The Māori have discovered New Zealand.'
b.	Tussen ongeveer 1250 en 1300	**ontdekten**	de Māori	Nieuw-Zeeland
Between approximately 1250 and 1300	discovered	the Māori	New Zealand
...'Between about 1250 and 1300, the Māori discovered New Zealand.'
c.	Niemand	**had**
Nobody	had
...'Nobody figured that anything would happen.'
Embedded clause	d.	dat	de Māori	Nieuw-Zeeland
that	the Māori	New Zealand
...'that the Māori have discovered New Zealand'

**Right bracket**
ontdekt
discovered
gedacht
thought
**hebben** ontdekt
have discovered

**Final field**
dat ook maar iets zou gebeuren.

This analysis suggests a close parallel between the V2 finite form in main clauses and the conjunctions in embedded clauses. Each is seen as an introduction to its clause-type, a function which some modern scholars have equated with the notion of specifier. The analysis is supported in spoken Dutch by the placement of clitic pronoun subjects. Forms such as ze cannot stand alone, unlike the full-form equivalent zij. The words to which they may be attached are those same introduction words: the V2 form in a main clause, or the conjunction in an embedded clause.

		**First field**	**Left bracket**	**Central field**		**Right bracket**	**Final field**
Main clause	e.	Tussen ongeveer 1250 en 1300	**ontdekten**-ze	Nieuw-Zeeland
		between approximately 1250 and 1300	discovered-they	New Zealand
		...'Between about 1250 and 1300, they discovered New Zealand.'
Embedded clause	f.		dat-ze	tussen ongeveer 1250 en 1300	Nieuw-Zeeland	**hebben** ontdekt
			that-they	between approximately 1250 and 1300	New Zealand	have discovered
		...'that they have discovered New Zealand between about 1250 and 1300'

Subordinate clauses:

In Dutch subordinate clauses two word orders are possible for the verb clusters and are referred to as the "red": omdat ik heb gewerkt, "because I have worked": like in English, where the auxiliary verb precedes the past particle, and the "green": omdat ik gewerkt heb, where the past particle precedes the auxiliary verb, "because I worked have": like in German. In Dutch, the green word order is the most used in speech, and the red is the most used in writing, particularly in journalistic texts, but the green is also used in writing as is the red in speech. Unlike in English however adjectives and adverbs must precede the verb: ''dat het boek groen is'', "that the book green is".

		**First field**	**Left bracket**	**Central field**			**Right bracket**	**Final field**
Embedded clause	g.		omdat	ik	het	dan	gezien **zou** hebben	most common in the Netherlands
			because	I	it	then	seen would have
	h.		omdat	ik	het	dan	**zou** gezien hebben	most common in Belgium
			because	I	it	then	would seen have
	i.		omdat	ik	het	dan	**zou** hebben gezien	often used in writing in both countries, but common in speech as well, most common in Limburg
			because	I	it	then	would have seen
	j.		omdat	ik	het	dan	gezien hebben **zou**	used in Friesland, Groningen and Drenthe, least common but used as well
			because	I	it	then	seen have would
		...'because then I would have seen it'

==== V2 in Icelandic and Yiddish ====
These languages freely allow V2 order in embedded clauses.

Icelandic
Two word-order patterns are largely similar to continental Scandinavian. However, in main clauses an extra slot is needed for when the front position is occupied by Það. In these clauses the subject follows any sentence adverbs. In embedded clauses, sentence adverbs follow the finite verb (an optional order in Faroese).

main clause embedded clause		**Front** —	**Finite verb** **Conjunction**	**Subject**; **Subject**	— **Finite verb**	**Sentence adverb** **Sentence adverb**	**Subject** —	**Non-finite verb** **Non-finite verb**	**Object**; **Object**	**Adverbial**; **Adverbial**
main clause	a.	Margir	**höfðu**			aldrei		lokið	verkefninu.
		Many	had			never		finished	the assignment		...	'Many had never finished the assignment.'
	b.	Það	**höfðu**			aldrei	margir	lokið	verkefninu.
		there	have			never	many	finished	the assignment		...	'There were never many people who had finished the assignment.'
	c.	Bókina	**hefur**	María		ekki		lesið.
		the book	has	Mary		not		read			...	'Mary hasn't read the book.'
embedded clause	d.		hvort	María	**hefur**	ekki		lesið	bokina.
			whether	Mary	has	not		read	the book		...	'whether Mary hasn't read the book'

In more radical contrast with other Germanic languages, a third pattern exists for embedded clauses with the conjunction followed by the V2 order: front-finite verb-subject.

			**Conjunction**	**Front** **(Topic adverbial)**	**Finite verb**	**Subject**
e.	Jón	**efast**	um að	á morgun	**fari**	María	snemma	á fætur.
	John	doubts	that	tomorrow	get	Mary	early	up	...	'John doubts that Mary will get up early tomorrow.'
			**Conjunction**	**Front** **(Object)**	**Finite verb**	**Subject**
f.	Jón	**harmar**	að	þessa bók	**skuli**	ég	hafa	lesið.
	John	regrets	that	this book	shall	I	have	read	...	'John regrets that I have read this book.'

Yiddish
Unlike Standard German, Yiddish normally has verb forms before Objects (SVO order), and in embedded clauses has conjunction followed by V2 order.

	**Front** **(Subject)**	**Finite verb**				**Conjunction**	**Front** **(Subject)**	**Finite verb**
a.	ikh	**hob**		gezen	mitvokh,	az	ikh	**vel**	nit	kenen	kumen	donershtik
	I	have		seen	Wednesday	that	I	will	not	can	come	Thursday	...	'I saw on Wednesday that I wouldn't be able to come on Thursday.'
	**Front** **(Adverbial)**	**Finite verb**	**Subject**			**Conjunction**	**Front** **(Adverbial)**	**Finite verb**	**Subject**
b.	mitvokh	**hob**	ikh	gezen,		az	donershtik	**vel**	ikh	nit	kenen	kumen
	Wednesday	have	I	seen		that	Thursday	will	I	not	can	come	...	On Wednesday I saw that on Thursday I wouldn't be able to come.'

=== Root clauses ===
One type of embedded clause with V2 following the conjunction is found throughout the Germanic languages, although it is more common in some than it is otherwise. These are termed root clauses. They are declarative content clauses, the direct objects of so-called bridge verbs, which are understood to quote a statement. For that reason, they exhibit the V2 word order of the equivalent direct quotation.

Danish
Items other than the subject are allowed to appear in front position.

			**Conjunction**	**Front** **(Subject)**		**Finite verb**
a.	Vi	**ved**	at	Bo	ikke	**har**	læst	denne bog
	We	know	that	Bo	not	has	read	this book	...	'We know that Bo has not read this book.'
			**Conjunction**	**Front** **(Object)**	**Finite verb**	**Subject**
b.	Vi	**ved**	at	denne bog	**har**	Bo	ikke	læst
	We	know	that	this book	has	Bo	not	read	...	'We know that Bo has not read this book.'

Swedish
Items other than the subject are occasionally allowed to appear in front position. Generally, the statement must be one with which the speaker agrees.

			**Conjunction**	**Front** **(Adverbial)**	**Finite verb**	**Subject**
d.	Jag	**tror**	att	i det fallet	**har**	du	rätt
	I	think	that	in that respect	have	you	right	...	'I think that in that respect you are right.'

This order is not possible with a statement with which the speaker does not agree.

				**Conjunction**	**Front** **(Adverbial)**	**Finite verb**	**Subject**
e.	*Jag	**tror**	inte	att	i det fallet	**har**	du	rätt			(The asterisk signals that the sentence is not grammatically acceptable.)
	I	think	not	that	in that respect	have	you	right	...	'I don't think that in that respect you are right.'

Norwegian

			**Conjunction**	**Front** **(Adverbial)**	**Finite verb**	**Subject**
f.	hun	**fortalte**	at	til fødselsdagen	**hadde**	hun	fått	kunstbok			(Bokmål variety)
	she	told	that	for her birthday	had'	she	received	art-book	...	'She said that for her birthday she had been given a book on art.'

German
Root clause V2 order is possible only when the conjunction dass is omitted. In such cases, formal usage also places the finite verb form into the present subjunctive (German Konjunktiv I) if the verb form is clearly distinguishable from the indicative; if not, the past subjunctive (German Konjunktiv II) is used.

			**Conjunction**	**Front** **(Subject)**	**Finite verb**
g.	*Er	**behauptet**,	dass	er	**hat**	es	zur Post	gebracht			(The asterisk signals that the sentence is not grammatically acceptable.)
h.	Er	**behauptet**,		er	**habe**	es	zur Post	gebracht
	he	claims	(that)	he	has	it	to the post office	taken	...	'He claims that he took it to the post office.'

By contrast, a form with an embedded first-person subject would usually use the past subjunctive here, since the present indicative and subjunctive appear identical: Er behauptet, ich hätte (instead of habe) es zur Post gebracht.

Compare the normal embed-clause order after dass

			**Left bracket** **(Conjunction)**	**Central field**	**Right bracket** **(Verb forms)**
i.	Er	**behauptet**,	dass	er es zur Post	gebracht **hat**
	he	claims	that	he it to the post office	taken has

=== Perspective effects on embedded V2 ===
There are a limited number of V2 languages that can allow for embedded verb movement for a specific pragmatic effect similar to that of English. This is due to the perspective of the speaker. Languages such as German and Swedish have embedded verb second. The embedded verb second in these kinds of languages usually occur after 'bridge verbs'.

(Bridge verbs are common verbs of speech and thoughts such as "say", "think", and "know", and the word "that" is not needed after these verbs. For example: I think he is coming.)

Jag ska säga dig att jag är inte ett dugg intresserad.
I will say you that I am not a dew interested.
"I tell you that I am not the least bit interested."
→ In this sentence, "tell" is the bridge verb and "am" is an embedded verb second.

Based on an assertion theory, the perspective of a speaker is reaffirmed in embedded V2 clauses. A speaker's sense of commitment to or responsibility for V2 in embedded clauses is greater than a non-V2 in embedded clause. This is the result of V2 characteristics. As shown in the examples below, there is a greater commitment to the truth in the embedded clause when V2 is in place.

Maria denkt, dass Peter glücklich ist.
Maria-NOM-SG think-PRES-3SG, that Peter-NOM-SG happy be-PRES-3SG
→ In a non-V2 embedded clause, the speaker is only committed to the truth of the statement "Maria thinks ..."

Maria denkt, Peter ist glücklich.
Maria-NOM-SG think-PRES-3SG, Peter-NOM-SG be-PRES-3SG happy.
→ In a V2 embedded clause, the speaker is committed to the truth of the statement "Maria thinks ..." and also the proposition "Peter is happy".

== Variations ==
Variations of V2 order such as V1 (verb-initial word order), V3 and V4 orders are widely attested in many Early Germanic and Medieval Romance languages. These variations are possible in the languages however it is severely restricted to specific contexts.

=== V1 word order ===
V1 (verb-initial word order) is a type of structure that contains the finite verb as the initial clause element. In other words, the verb appears before the subject and the object of the sentence.

          (a) Max y-il    [s no' tx;i;] [o naq Lwin].    (Mayan) 
              PFV A3-see  CLF dog       CLF Pedro 
              'The dog saw Pedro.'

=== V3 word order ===
V3 (verb-third word order) is a variation of V2 in which the finite verb is in third position with two constituents preceding it.

In V3, like in V2 word order, the constituents preceding the finite verb are not categorically restricted, as the constituents can be a DP, a PP, a CP and so on.

[_{DP} Jedes Jahr] [_{Pn} ich] kauf mir bei Deichmann
{} every year {} I buy.PRS.1SG me.DAT.SG at Deichmann.DAT.SG
"Every year I buy (shoes) at Deichmann's"

[_{PP} Ab jetzt] [_{Pn} ich] krieg immer zwanzig Euro
{} from now {} I get.PRS.SG always twenty euro.ACC.PL
"From now on, I always get twenty euros"

== Left edge filling trigger (LEFT) ==
V2 is fundamentally derived from a morphological obligatory exponence effect at sentence level. The left edge filling trigger (LEFT) effects are usually seen in classical V2 languages such as Germanic languages and Old Romance languages. The left edge filling trigger is independently active in morphology as EPP effects are found in word-internal levels. The obligatory exponence derives from absolute displacement, ergative displacement and ergative doubling in inflectional morphology. In addition, second position rules in clitic second languages demonstrate post-syntactic rules of LEFT movement. Using the Breton language as an example, absence of a pre-tense expletive will allow for the LEFT to occur to avoid tense-first. The LEFT movement is free from syntactic rules which is evidence for a post-syntactic phenomenon. With the LEFT movement, V2 word order can be obtained as seen in the example below.

Bez 'nevo hennex traou
EXPL Fin.[will.have] he things
"He will have goods"

In this Breton example, the finite head is phonetically realized and agrees with the category of the preceding element. The pre-tense "Bez" is used in front of the finite verb to obtain the V2 word order. (finite verb "nevo" is bolded).

== Syntactic verb second ==
It is said that V2 patterns are a syntactic phenomenon and therefore have certain environments where it can and cannot be tolerated. Syntactically, V2 requires a left-peripheral head (usually C) with an occupied specifier and paired with raising the highest verb-auxiliary to that head. V2 is usually analyzed as the co-occurrence of these requirements, which can also be referred to as "triggers". The left-peripheral head, which is a requirement that causes the effect of V2, sets further requirements on a phrase XP that occupies the initial position, so that this phrase XP may always have specific featural characteristics.

== English ==
Modern English differs greatly in word order from other modern Germanic languages, but earlier English shared many similarities. For this reason, some scholars propose a description of Old English with V2 constraint as the norm. The history of English syntax is thus seen as a process of losing the constraint.

=== Old English ===
In these examples, finite verb forms are in green, non-finite verb forms are in orange and subjects are blue.

==== Main clauses ====
Se mæssepreost sceal manum bodian þone soþan geleafan
the masspriest shall people preach the true faith
'The mass priest shall preach the true faith to the people.'

Hwi wolde God swa lytles þinges him forwyrman
Why would God so small thing him deny
'Why would God deny him such a small thing?'

on twam þingum hæfde God þæs mannes sawle geododod
in two things has God the man's soul endowed
'With two things God had endowed man's soul.'

þa wæs þæt folc þæs micclan welan ungemetlice brucende
then was the people of-the great prosperity excessively partaking
'Then the people were partaking excessively of the great prosperity.'

Ne sceal he naht unaliefedes don
not shall he nothing unlawful do
'He shall not do anything unlawful.'

Ðas ðreo ðing forgifð God he gecorenum
these three things gives God his chosen
'These three things God gives to his chosen

==== Position of object ====
In examples b, c and d, the object of the clause precedes a non-finite verb form. Superficially, the structure is verb-subject-object- verb. To capture generalities, scholars of syntax and linguistic typology treat them as basically subject-object-verb (SOV) structure, modified by the V2 constraint. Thus Old English is classified, to some extent, as an SOV language. However, example a represents a number of Old English clauses with object following a non-finite verb form, with the superficial structure verb-subject-verb object. A more substantial number of clauses contain a single finite verb form followed by an object, superficially verb-subject-object. Again, a generalisation is captured by describing these as subject–verb–object (SVO) modified by V2. Thus Old English can be described as intermediate between SOV languages (like German and Dutch) and SVO languages (like Swedish and Icelandic).

==== Effect of subject pronouns ====
When the subject of a clause was a personal pronoun, V2 did not always operate.

forðon we sceolan mid ealle mod & mægene to Gode gecyrran
therefore we must with all mind and power to God turn
'Therefore, we must turn to God with all our mind and power

However, V2 verb-subject inversion occurred without exception after a question word or the negative ne, and with few exceptions after þa even with pronominal subjects.

for hwam noldest þu {ðe sylfe} me gecyðan þæt...
for what not-wanted you yourself me make-known that...
'wherefore would you not want to make known to me yourself that...'

Ne sceal he naht unaliefedes don
not shall he nothing unlawful do
'He shall not do anything unlawful.'

þa foron hie mid þrim scipum ut
then sailed they with three ships out
'Then they sailed out with three ships.'

Inversion of a subject pronoun also occurred regularly after a direct quotation.

"Me is," cwæð hēo "Þīn cyme on miclum ðonce"
{to me} is said she your coming in much thankfulness
'"Your coming," she said, "is very gratifying to me".'

==== Embedded clauses ====
Embedded clauses with pronoun subjects were not subject to V2. Even with noun subjects, V2 inversion did not occur.

...þa ða his leorningcnichtas hine axodon for hwæs synnum se man wurde swa blind acenned
...when his disciples him asked for whose sins the man became thus blind {}
'...when his disciples asked him for whose sins the man was thus born blind'

==== Yes–no questions ====
In a similar clause pattern, the finite verb form of a yes–no question occupied the first position

Truwast ðu nu þe selfum and þinum geferum bet þonne ðam apostolum...?
trust you now you self and your companions better than the apostles
'Do you now trust yourself and your companions better than the apostles...?'

=== Middle English ===
==== Continuity ====
Early Middle English generally preserved V2 structure in clauses with nominal subjects.

On þis gær wolde þe king Stephne tæcen Rodbert
in this year wanted the king Stephen seize Robert
'During this year King Stephen wanted to seize Robert.'

Nu loke euerich man toward himseleun
now look every man to himself
'Now it's for every man to look to himself.'

As in Old English, V2 inversion did not apply to clauses with pronoun subjects.

bi þis ȝe mahen seon ant witen...
by this you may see and know

alle ðese bebodes ic habbe ihealde fram childhade
all those commandments I have kept from childhood

==== Change ====
Late Middle English texts of the fourteenth and fifteenth centuries show increasing incidence of clauses without the inversion associated with V2.

sothely se ryghtwyse sekys þe loye and...
Truly the righteous seeks the joy and...

And by þis same skyle hop and sore shulle jugen us
And by this same skill hope and sorrow shall judge us

Negative clauses were no longer formed with ne (or na) as the first element. Inversion in negative clauses was attributable to other causes.

why ordeyned God not such ordre
why ordained God not such order
'Why did God not ordain such an order?' (not follows noun phrase subject)

why shulde he not...
why should he not

Ther nys nat oon kan war by other be
there not-is not one can aware by other be
'There is not a single person who learns from the mistakes of others'

He was despeyred; {no thyng} dorste he seye
He was {in despair}; nothing dared he say

=== Vestiges in Modern English ===
As in earlier periods, Modern English normally has subject-verb order in declarative clauses and inverted verb-subject order in interrogative clauses. However these norms are observed irrespective of the number of clause elements preceding the verb.

==== Classes of verbs in Modern English: auxiliary and lexical ====
Inversion in Old English sentences with a combination of two verbs could be described in terms of their finite and non-finite forms. The word which participated in inversion was the finite verb; the verb which retained its position relative to the object was the non-finite verb. In most types of Modern English clause, there are two verb forms, but the verbs are considered to belong to different syntactic classes. The verbs which participated in inversion have evolved to form a class of auxiliary verbs which may mark tense, aspect and mood; the remaining majority of verbs with full semantic value are said to constitute the class of lexical verbs. The exceptional type of clause is that of declarative clause with a lexical verb in a present simple or past simple form.

==== Questions ====
Like Yes/No questions, interrogative Wh- questions are regularly formed with inversion of subject and auxiliary. Present Simple and Past Simple questions are formed with the auxiliary do, a process known as do-support.

a. Which game is Sam watching?
b. Where does she live?

(see subject-auxiliary inversion in questions)

==== With topic adverbs and adverbial phrases ====
In certain patterns similar to Old and Middle English, inversion is possible. However, this is a matter of stylistic choice, unlike the constraint on interrogative clauses.

negative or restrictive adverbial first

c. At no point will he drink Schnapps.
d. No sooner had she arrived than she started to make demands.

(see negative inversion)

comparative adverb or adjective first

e. So keenly did the children miss their parents, they cried themselves to sleep.
f. Such was their sadness, they could never enjoy going out.

After the preceding classes of adverbial, only auxiliary verbs, not lexical verbs, participate in inversion

locative or temporal adverb first

g. Here comes the bus.
h. Now is the hour when we must say goodbye.

prepositional phrase first

i. Behind the goal sat many photographers.
j. Down the road came the person we were waiting for.

(see locative inversion, directive inversion)

After the two latter types of adverbial, only one-word lexical verb forms (Present Simple or Past Simple), not auxiliary verbs, participate in inversion, and only with noun-phrase subjects, not pronominal subjects.

==== Direct quotations ====
When the object of a verb is a verbatim quotation, it may precede the verb, with a result similar to Old English V2. Such clauses are found in storytelling and in news reports.

k. "Wolf! Wolf!" cried the boy.
l. "The unrest is spreading throughout the country," writes our Jakarta correspondent.

(see quotative inversion)

==== Declarative clauses without inversion ====
Corresponding to the above examples, the following clauses show the normal Modern English subject-verb order.

Declarative equivalents

a′. Sam is watching the Cup games.
b′. She lives in the country.

Equivalents without topic fronting

c′. He will at no point drink Schnapps.
d′. She had no sooner arrived than she started to make demands.
e′. The children missed their parents so keenly that they cried themselves to sleep.
g′. The bus is coming here.
h′. The hour when we must say goodbye is now.
i′. Many photographers sat behind the goal.
j′. The person we were waiting for came down the road.
k′. The boy cried "Wolf! Wolf!"
l′. Our Jakarta correspondent writes, "The unrest is spreading throughout the country" .

== French ==
Modern French is a subject-verb-object (SVO) language like other Romance languages (though Latin was a subject-object-verb language). However, V2 constructions existed in Old French and were more common than in other early Romance language texts. It has been suggested that this may be due to influence from the Germanic Frankish language. Modern French has vestiges of the V2 system similar to those found in modern English.

The following sentences have been identified as possible examples of V2 syntax in Old French:

a.	Old French	Longetemps	fu	ly	roys	Elinas	en	la	montaigne
	Modern French	Longtemps	fut	le	roi	Elinas	dans	la	montagne	....	'Pendant longtemps le roi Elinas a été dans les montagnes.'
	English	For a long time	was	the	king	Elinas	in	the	mountain	...	'King Elinas was in the mountains for a long time.'

b.	Old French	Iteuses	paroles	distrent	li	frere	de	Lancelot
	Modern French	Telles	paroles	dirent	les	frères	de	Lancelot	....	'Les frères de Lancelot ont dit ces paroles'
	English	Such	words	uttered	the	brothers	of	Lancelot	....	'Lancelot's brothers spoke these words.'

c.	Old French	Atant	regarda	contreval	la	mer
	Modern French	Alors	regarda	en bas	la	mer	....	'Alors Il a regardé la mer plus bas.'
	English	Then	looked at	downward	the	sea	....	'Then he looked down at the sea.' (Elision of subject pronoun, contrary to the general rule in other Old French clause structures.)

=== Old French ===
Similarly to Modern French, Old French allows a range of constituents to precede the finite verb in the V2 position.

Il oste ses armes
He removes.3sg his weapons
'He removes his weapons'

=== Old Occitan ===
A language that is compared to Old French is Old Occitan, which is said to be the sister of Old French. Although the two languages are thought to be sister languages, Old Occitan exhibits a relaxed V2 whereas Old French has a much more strict V2. However, the differences between the two languages extend past V2 and also differ in a variation of V2, which is V3. In both language varieties, occurrence of V3 can be triggered by the presence of an initial frame-setting clause or adverbial (1).

Car s'il ne me garde de pres, je ne dout mie
For if-he NEG me.CL= look.3SG of close I NEG doubt.1SG NEG
'Since he watches me so closely, I do not doubt'

== Other languages ==
=== Estonian ===
In Estonian, V2 is the norm in main clauses in the literate register, as illustrated in (1).

Kiiresti lahku-s-id õpilase-d koolimaja-st.
quickly leave-PST-3PL student-NOM.PL schoolhouse-ELA
'The students departed quickly from the schoolhouse.'

However, there are frequent deviations from V2 in the spoken register. Even in the written register, V2 does not apply to embedded clauses. Formal relative clauses typically show the SOV word order, while this one chiefly involves the nonfinite verb elsewhere. Estonian differs from Germanic V2 languages in not using V2 in certain main clauses such as wh-interrogatives (2), exclamatives (3), and non-subject-initial negative clauses (4).

Kes mei-le täna külla tule-b?
who.NOM we-ALL today village/visit.ILL come-PRS.3SG
'Who will visit us today?'

Küll ta täna tule-b.
EMP s/he.NOM today come-PRS.3SG
'S/he's sure to come today!'

Täna ta mei-le külla ei tule.
today s/he.NOM we-ALL village/visit.ILL not come
'Today s/he won't come to visit us.'

=== Kotgarhi and Kochi ===
In his 1976 three-volume study of two languages of Himachal Pradesh, Hendriksen reports on two intermediate cases: Kotgarhi and Kochi. Although neither language shows a regular V2 pattern, they have evolved to the point that main and subordinate clauses differ in word order and auxiliaries may separate from other parts of the verb:

hyunda-baassie jaa gõrmi hõ-i
winter-after goes summer become-GER
"After winter comes summer." (Hendriksen III:186)

Hendriksen reports that relative clauses in Kochi show a greater tendency to have the finite verbal element in clause-final position than matrix clauses do (III:188).

=== Ingush ===
In Ingush, "for main clauses, other than episode-initial and other all-new ones, verb-second order is most common. The verb, or the finite part of a compound verb or analytic tense form (i.e. the light verb or the auxiliary), follows the first word or phrase in the clause."

muusaa vy hwuona telefon jettazh
Musa V.PROG 2sg.DAT telephone striking
'Musa is telephoning you.'

=== O'odham ===
O'odham has relatively free V2 word order within clauses; for example, all of the following sentences mean "the boy brands the pig":

          ceoj ʼo g ko:jĭ ceposid
          ko:jĭ ʼo g ceoj ceposid
          ceoj ʼo ceposid g ko:jĭ
          ko:jĭ ʼo ceposid g ceoj
          ceposid ʼo g ceoj g ko:jĭ
          ceposid ʼo g ko:jĭ g ceoj

The finite verb is "'o" and appears after a constituent in the second position.

Despite the general freedom of sentence word order, O'odham is fairly strictly V2 in its placement of the auxiliary verb (in the sentences above, it is ʼo; in the sentences below, it is ʼañ):

          Affirmative: cipkan ʼañ = "I am working"
          Negative: pi ʼañ cipkan = "I am not working" [not *pi cipkan ʼañ]

=== Sursilvan ===
Among dialects of the Romansh, V2 word order is limited to Sursilvan, the insertion of entire phrases between auxiliary verbs and participles occurs, as in 'Cun Mariano Tschuor ha Augustin Beeli discurriu ' ('Mariano Tschuor has spoken with Augustin Beeli'), as compared to Engadinese 'Cun Rudolf Gasser ha discurrü Gion Peider Mischol' ('Rudolf Gasser has spoken with Gion Peider Mischol'.)

The constituent that is bounded by the auxiliary, ha, and the participle, discurriu, is known as a Satzklammer or 'verbal bracket'.

=== Welsh ===
In Welsh, V2 word order is found in Middle Welsh but not in Old and Modern Welsh, which have only verb-initial order. Middle Welsh displays three characteristics of V2 grammar:

         (1)	A finite verb in the C-domain
         (2)	The constituent preceding the verb can be any constituent (often driven by pragmatic features). 
         (3)	Only one constituent preceding the verb in subject position

As can be seen in the following examples of V2 in Welsh, there is only one constituent preceding the finite verb, but any kind of constituent (such as a noun phrase NP, adverb phrase AP and preposition phrase PP) can occur in this position.

[_{DP} 'r guyrda a] doethant {y gyt}.
{} the nobles PRT came together.
"The nobles came together"
→ This sentence has a constituent with a subject, followed by the verb in second position.

[_{DP} deu drws a] welynt yn agoret.
{} two door PRT saw PRED open.
"They saw two doors that were open"
→ This sentence has a constituent with an object, followed by the verb in second position.

[_{AdvP} yn diannot y] doeth tan o r nef.
{} PRED immediate PRT came fire from the heaven.
"Immediately there came fire from the heavens"
→ This sentence has a constituent that is an adverb phrase, followed by the verb in second position.

[_{PP} y r neuad y] kyrchyssant.
{} to the hall PRT went.
"They made for the hall"
→ This sentence has a constituent that is a preposition phrase, followed by the verb in second position.

Middle Welsh can also exhibit variations of V2 such as cases of V1 (verb-initial word order) and V3 orders. However, these variations are restricted to specific contexts, such as in sentences with impersonal verbs, imperatives, answers or direct responses to questions or commands and idiomatic sayings. A preverbal particle can also precede the verb in V2, but such sentences are limited as well.

=== Wymysorys ===
Wymysorys is classified as a West Germanic language but can exhibit various Slavonic characteristics. It is argued that Wymysorys enables its speaker to operate between two word order system, which represent both forces driving its grammar: Germanic and Slavonic. The Germanic system is not as flexible and allows for V2 to exist in it form, but the Slavonic system is relatively free. The rigid word order in the Germanic system causes the placement of the verb to be determined by syntactic rules in which V2 is commonly respected.

Wymysorys, like with other languages that exhibit V2, has the finite verb in second position, and a constituent of any category precedes the verb such as DP, PP, AP and so on.

[_{DP} Der klop] kuzt wymyioerys.
{} The man speaks Wymysorys.
"The man speaks Wymysorys"
→ This sentence has a constituent with a subject, followed by the verb in second position.

[_{DP} Dos bihɫa] hot yh gyśrejwa.
{} This book had I written.
"I had written that book"
→ This sentence has a constituent with an object, followed by the verb in second position.

[_{PP} Fjyr ejn] ej do.
{} For him is this.
"This is for him"
→ This sentence has a preposition phrase, followed by the verb in second position.

=== Classical Portuguese ===
V2 word order existed in Classical Portuguese much longer than in other Romance languages. Although Classical Portuguese was a V2 language, V1 occurred more frequently and so it is argued whether or not Classical Portuguese really is a V2-like language. However, Classical Portuguese was a relaxed V2 language, and V2 co-exist with its variations: V1 and V3. Classical Portuguese had a strong relationship between V1 and V2 since V2 clauses were derived from V1 clauses.

In languages where both V1 and V2 exist, both patterns depend on the movement of the verb to a high position of the CP layer. The difference is whether or not a phrase is moved to a preverbal position.

Although V1 occurred more frequently in Classical Portuguese, V2 was more frequently found in matrix clauses. Post-verbal subjects could also occupy a high position in the clause and precede VP adverbs. In (1) and (2), it can be seen that the adverb 'bem' could be before or after the post-verbal subject.

E nos gasalhados e abraços mostraram os cardeais legados
and in-the welcome and greetings showed the cardinals delegates
'In the welcome and greetings the cardinal delegates showed this satisfaction well.'

E quadra-lhe bem o nome de Piemonte...
and fits-CL.3.DAT well the name of Piemonte
'And the name of Piemonte fits it well...'

In (2), the post-verbal subject is understood as an informational focus, but the same cannot be said for (1) because the different positions determine how the subject is interpreted.

== Structural analysis ==
Various structural analyses of V2 have been developed, including within the model of dependency grammar and generative grammar.

=== Dependency grammar ===
Dependency grammar (DG) can accommodate the V2 phenomenon simply by stipulating that one and only one constituent must be a predependent of the finite verb (i.e. a dependent which precedes its head) in declarative (matrix) clauses (in this, Dependency Grammar assumes only one clausal level and one position of the verb, instead of a distinction between a VP-internal and a higher clausal position of the verb as in Generative Grammar, cf. the next section). On this account, the V2 principle is violated if the finite verb has more than one predependent or no predependent at all. The following DG structures of the first four German sentences above illustrate the analysis (the sentence means 'The kids play soccer in the park before school'):

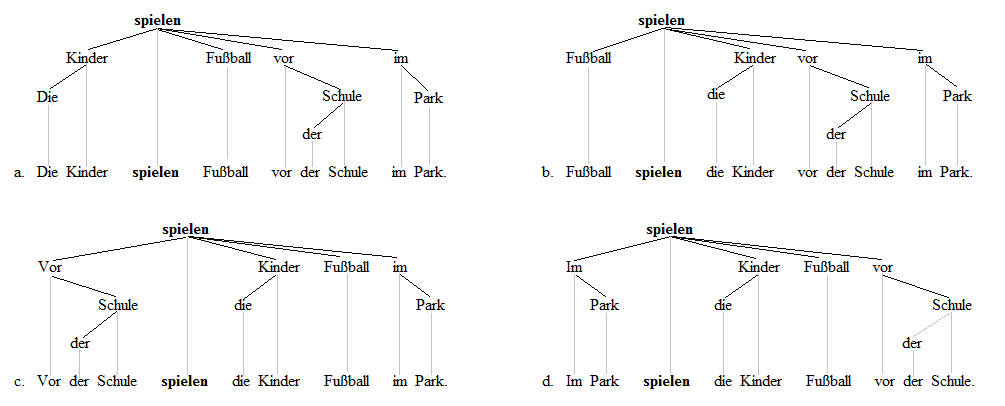

The finite verb spielen is the root of all clause structure. The V2 principle requires that this root have a single predependent, which it does in each of the four sentences.

The four English sentences above involving the V2 phenomenon receive the following analyses:

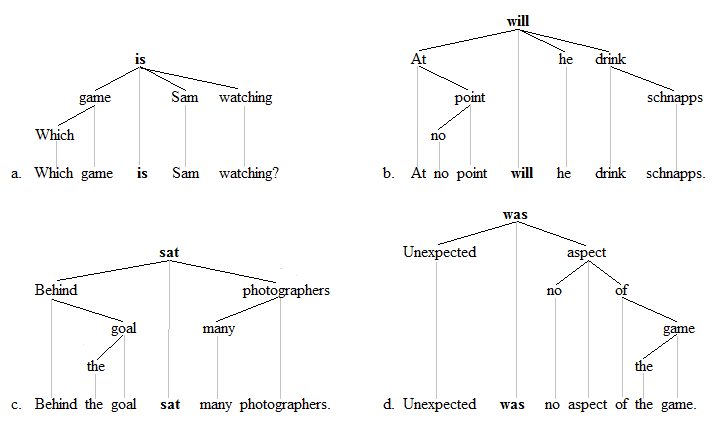

=== Generative grammar ===
In the theory of Generative Grammar, the verb second phenomenon has been described as an application of X-bar theory. The combination of a first position for a phrase and a second position for a single verb has been identified as the combination of specifier and head of a phrase. The part after the finite verb is then the complement. While the sentence structure of English is usually analysed in terms of three levels, CP, IP, and VP, in German linguistics the consensus has emerged that there is no IP in German.

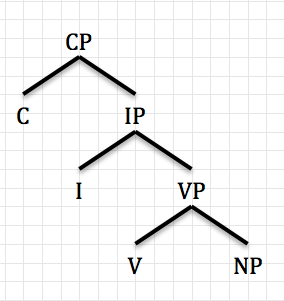
Tree structure for the English clause. German does not use an "I" position and has a VP with the verb at the end.

The VP (verb phrase) structure assigns position and functions to the arguments of the verb. Hence, this structure is shaped by the grammatical properties of the V (verb) which heads the structure. The CP (complementizer phrase) structure incorporates the grammatical information which identifies the clause as declarative or interrogative, main or embedded. The structure is shaped by the abstract C (complementiser) which is considered the head of the structure. In embedded clauses the C position accommodates complementizers. In German declarative main clauses, C hosts the finite verb. Thus the V2 structure is analysed as

1 Topic element (specifier of CP)
2 Finite-verb form (C=head of CP) i.e. verb-second
3 Remainder of the clause

In embedded clauses, the C position is occupied by a complementizer. In most Germanic languages (but not in Icelandic or Yiddish), this generally prevents the finite verb from moving to C.

The structure is analysed as

1 Complementizer (C=head of CP)
2 Bulk of clause (VP), including, in German, the subject.
3 Finite verb (V position)

This analysis does not provide a structure for the instances in some language of root clauses after bridge verbs.

Example: Danish Vi ved at denne bog har Bo ikke læst with the object of the embedded clause fronted.
(Literally 'We know that this book has Bo not read')

The solution is to allow verbs such as ved to accept a clause with a second (recursive) CP.

The complementizer occupies C position in the upper CP.
The finite verb moves to the C position in the lower CP.

== See also ==
- Second position clitics

== Literature ==
- Adger, David (2003). Core syntax: A minimalist approach. Oxford: Oxford University Press. ISBN 9780199243709. OCLC 50768042.
- Ágel, Vilmos; Eichinger, Ludwig M.; Eroms, Hans Werner; Hellwig, Peter; Heringer, Hans Jürgen; Lobin, Henning, eds. (2003). Dependency and valency: An international handbook of contemporary research (in German and English). Vol. 1. Berlin: Walter de Gruyter. doi:10.1515/9783110141900.1. ISBN 978-3-11-014190-0.
- Ágel, Vilmos; Eichinger, Ludwig M.; Eroms, Hans Werner; Hellwig, Peter; Heringer, Hans Jürgen; Lobin, Henning, eds. (2006). Dependency and valency: An international handbook of contemporary research (in German and English). Vol. 2. Berlin: Walter de Gruyter. doi:10.1515/9783110171525.2. ISBN 978-3-11-019984-0.
- Borsley, Robert D. (1996). Modern phrase structure grammar. Cambridge, MA: Blackwell. ISBN 9780631184065. OCLC 33971140.
- Carnie, Andrew (2007). Syntax: A generative introduction (2nd ed.). Malden, MA: Blackwell. ISBN 9781405133845. OCLC 64897498.
- Emonds, Joseph (1976). A transformational approach to English syntax: Root, structure-preserving, and local transformations. New York: Academic Press. ISBN 9780122385506. OCLC 1602318.
- Fagan, Sarah M. B. (2009). German: A linguistic introduction. Cambridge: Cambridge University Press. ISBN 9780511650789. OCLC 592756250.
- Fischer, Olga; van Kermenade, Ans; Koopman, Willem; van der Wurff, Wim (2000). The Syntax of Early English. Cambridge: Cambridge University Press. doi:10.1017/CBO9780511612312. ISBN 978-0-521-55626-2. OCLC 51296812.
- Fromkin, Victoria, ed. (2000). Linguistics: An introduction to linguistic theory. Malden, MA: Blackwell. ISBN 9780631197096. OCLC 43577669.
- Harbert, Wayne (2007). The Germanic Languages. Cambridge: Cambridge University Press. doi:10.1017/CBO9780511755071. ISBN 978-0-521-80825-5.
- Hook, Peter Edwin (1976). "Is Kashmiri an SVO Language?". Indian Linguistics. 37: 133–142.
- König, Ekkehard; van der Auwera, Johan, eds. (1994). The Germanic Languages. Routledge. ISBN 9780415280792.
- Liver, Ricarda (2009). "Deutsche Einflüsse im Bündnerromanischen". In Elmentaler, Michael (ed.). Deutsch und seine Nachbarn (in German). Peter Lang. ISBN 978-3-631-58885-7.
- Migdalski, Krzysztof (2009). "On the relation between V2 and the second position cliticization". Lingua. 120 (2): 329–353. doi:10.1016/j.lingua.2008.05.005.
- Nichols, Johanna (2011). Ingush Grammar. University of California Publications in Linguistics. Vol. 143. Berkeley: University of California Press. ISBN 978-0-520-09877-0. LCCN 2011921478.
- Osborne, Timothy (2005). "Coherence: A dependency grammar analysis". SKY Journal of Linguistics. 18: 223–286.
- Ouhalla, Jamal (1994). Introducing transformational grammar: From rules to principles and parameters. London: Edward Arnold. ISBN 0-340-55630-7.
- Peters, Pam (2013). The Cambridge Dictionary of English Grammar. Cambridge: Cambridge University Press. doi:10.1017/CBO9781139050623. ISBN 978-1-139-05062-3.
- Posner, Rebecca (1996). The Romance languages. Cambridge: Cambridge University Press. ISBN 0-521-23654-1. OCLC 33242988.
- Rowlett, Paul (2007). The Syntax of French (PDF). Cambridge: Cambridge University Press. doi:10.1017/CBO9780511618642. ISBN 978-0-521-83532-9.
- van Riemsdijk, H.; Williams, E. (1986). Introduction to the theory of grammar. Cambridge, MA: The MIT Press. ISBN 9780262720090.
- Tesnière, Lucien (1959). Éleménts de syntaxe structurale (in French). Paris: Klincksieck.
- Thráinsson, Höskuldur (2007). The Syntax of Icelandic. Cambridge: Cambridge University Press. doi:10.1017/CBO9780511619441. ISBN 978-0-521-59190-4.
- Walkden, George (2017). "Language contact and V3 in germanic varieties new and old". The Journal of Comparative Germanic Linguistics. 20 (1): 49–81. doi:10.1007/s10828-017-9084-2.
- Wolfe, Sam; Woods, Rebecca, eds. (2020). Rethinking Verb Second. Oxford University Press. doi:10.1093/oso/9780198844303.001.0001. ISBN 978-0-19-884430-3.
  - Andrason, Alexander (2020). "Verb second in Wymysorys". In Wolfe, Sam; Woods, Rebecca (eds.). Rethinking Verb Second. Oxford University Press. pp. 700–722. doi:10.1093/oso/9780198844303.003.0030. ISBN 978-0-19-884430-3.
  - Jouitteau, Mélanie (2020). "Verb second and the left edge filling trigger". In Wolfe, Sam; Woods, Rebecca (eds.). Rethinking Verb Second. Oxford University Press. pp. 455–481. doi:10.1093/oso/9780198844303.003.0019. ISBN 978-0-19-884430-3.
  - Meelen, Marieke (2020). "Reconstructing the rise of verb second in Welsh". In Wolfe, Sam; Woods, Rebecca (eds.). Rethinking Verb Second. Oxford University Press. pp. 426–454. doi:10.1093/oso/9780198844303.003.0018. ISBN 978-0-19-884430-3.
  - Woods, Rebecca (2020). "A different perspective on embedded verb second". In Wolfe, Sam; Woods, Rebecca (eds.). Rethinking Verb Second. Oxford University Press. pp. 297–322. doi:10.1093/oso/9780198844303.003.0013. ISBN 978-0-19-884430-3.
- Zwart, Jan-Wouter (2011). The Syntax of Dutch. Cambridge: Cambridge University Press. doi:10.1017/CBO9780511977763. ISBN 978-0-521-87128-0.
