= Pro-verb =

Word that replaces a verb

In linguistics, a pro-verb is a word or partial phrase that substitutes for a contextually recognizable verb phrase (via a process known as grammatical gapping), obviating the need to repeat an antecedent verb phrase. A pro-verb is a type of anaphora that falls within the general group of word classes called pro-forms (pro-verb is an analog of the pronoun that applies to verbs instead of nouns). Many languages use a replacement verb as a pro-verb to avoid repetition: English "do" (for example, "I like pie, and so does he"), French: faire, Swedish: göra.

The parallels between the roles of pronouns and pro-verbs on language are "striking": both are anaphoric and coreferential, able to replace very complex syntactic structures. The latter property makes it sometimes impossible to replace a pro-verb with a verb, thus its utility (like the one of a pronoun) goes beyond the stylistic variation of word substitution. When choosing between substituting a pro-verb and repeating a verb, in multiple languages, including English, French, and Swedish the repetition is preferred by a wide margin (up to 80% to 20% ratio in the modern French). In many cases this is due to the presence of different objects, like in "I will read your letter every day, as a Christian reads the Gospels". Chance of using a pro-verb increases as the complexity of the verb phrase being replaced grows; verbs in the passive voice have lower chance of being substituted by a pro-verb.

The pro-verb construction can be applied when a "direct construction" (without preposition before the object) is used in the verb phrase, or with an "indirect construction" with a preposition. In the latter case, the preposition, depending on the language and context, can be either omitted from the pro-verb construct, added, copied, or modified. For example, in modern Swedish any preposition in a verb phrase is replaced by Swedish: med in the pro-verb (cf. insertion of "with" in English, "You can organize voicemail in folders as you do with email.")

== In English ==
The term "pro-verb" has been used in English linguistics since the 19th century. A standard example is provided by variations of the verb "do": "I liked the movie; she did too" (did stands for "liked it"). The discussions about the precise role of "do" (and "do it") in this context are ongoing in the 21st century.

English does not have dedicated pro-verbs. Auxiliary and catenative verbs that take bare infinitives can be said to double as pro-verbs by implying rather than expressing them (including most of the auxiliary verbs). Similarly, the auxiliary verbs have and be can double as pro-verbs for perfect, progressive, and passive constructions by eliding the participle. When there is no other auxiliary or catenative verb, do can be used as with do-support unless the antecedent verb is to be.

The following are some examples of these kinds of pro-verb:

- Who can tell? —No one can [tell].
- Why can't he do it? —He can [do it]; he just won't [do it].
- I like pie, as does he [like pie].
- Can you go to the park? No, I cannot [go to the park].

Note that, when there are multiple auxiliary verbs, some of these may be elided as well. For example, in reply to "Who's been leaving the milk out of the refrigerator?", any of "You've been doing it", "You have been", or "You have" would have the same meaning.

Since a to-infinitive is just the particle to plus a bare infinitive, and a bare infinitive can be elided, the particle to doubles as a pro-verb for a to-infinitive:

- Clean your room! —I don't want to [clean my room].
- He refused to clean his room when I told him to [clean his room].

Finally, even in dialects where bare infinitives and participles can be elided, there does exist the pro-verb do so: "He asked me to leave, so I did so". This pro-verb, unlike the above-described pro-verbs, can be used in any grammatical context; however, in contexts where another pro-verb could be used, it can be overly formal. For example, in "I want to get an 'A', but to do so, I need to get a perfect score on the next test," there is no other pro-verb that could be used; whereas in "I want to get an 'A', but I can't do so," the do so could simply be elided, and doing so would make the sentence sound less formal.

Some works, like A Comprehensive Grammar of the English Language, would consider pro-verbs in English as purely substitutional, unlike the coreferential pronouns.

English primarily uses direct objects, and absence of propositions is usually mirrored in the pro-verb ("You don't love me as much as I do you"). However, in the past, a preposition could have been affixed to the pro-verb: "She let him go — as a cat might have done to a mouse" (Dickens). In the modern English, as found online, there is a tendency to insert "with", especially if the verb phrase is complex or pro-verb precedes the verb phrase ("As you do with your driver, you need to swing this club with a sweeping motion").

== In Swedish ==
Swedish: göra ("do"/"make") is considered by the scholars of Swedish language as a Swedish: pronominellt verb or Swedish: pronominell verbfras (a "pronominal verb phrase"), the latter term reflects the typical use with pronoun, like Swedish: göra det ("do it").

The pro-verb phrases in Swedish use indirect construction for the object. While in the past the preposition appears to be typically omitted in the pro-verb, the modern language requires to use a single preposition, med, regardless of the preposition in the verb phrase (or absence of it), even if it produces an awkward syntax, Den här boken kan du läsa som man gör med de flesta böcker ("You can read this book as one does with most books").

== In French ==
In French, terms French: pronom verbal, verbe vicaire ("vicarious do", from Latin: verbum vicarium) are used to describe the pro-verb. The role of pro-verb is played by the verb faire ("make" or "do").

Olof Eriksson, a professor of French linguistics, offers the following example to illustrate that pro-verbs in French are not purely substitutional: Les ouvriers de l'entreprise Dardart se rendirent au café Le Transatlantique pour prendre l'apéritif, comme ils le faisaient une fois par semaine. Here, the replacement se rendirent au café Le Transatlantique pour prendre l'apéritif with faisaient enables une fois par semaine to start in the proper syntactic context of a comparative clause attached to the whole of se rendirent au café Le Transatlantique pour prendre l'apéritif.

The pronominal object in French naturally precludes the use of pro-verbs: "You don't love me as much as I do you" cannot be translated to French using the pro-verb fais. Four prepositions can be used between a pro-verb and an object: de, pour, avec, à. De is the most used one, but avec, currently in the third place by the frequency of use, is rapidly catching up. Ericsson explains the tendency by close proximity of this proposition to English "with" and med.

== In Russian ==
Pro-verbs are generally absent in Russian. One of the rare exceptions, "делать это" ("do it"), is used similarly to its English equivalent (but rarely). The other example is provided by the colloquial use of the extremely obscene expressions ("mat") where the verb derivatives from the most used obscene roots (the "obscene triad") lost their original semantics and their meaning is defined almost entirely by the affixes and context.

== In Chinese ==
In Chinese, the pro-verb role is sometimes played by the character Chinese: 来 ("to come"): in 你画的不象，等我来 lit. 'Your drawing is not like the real thing, wait for me to come!', the meaning of 来 is actually "do it". Understanding that 来 can be an equivalent of the pronoun for verbs was first suggested by Zhao Yuanren in 1968.

== See also ==
- Do-support

== Sources ==
- "Pro-Verb: The Complement to the Pronoun". Merriam-Webster. 2019-01-28.
- Austin, Frances (2007). "Points of Modern English Usage LXXXIII". English Studies. 88 (1): 95–107. doi:10.1080/00138380601042782. ISSN 0013-838X.
- Colapinto, Andrés (2020). "Do it anaphora without covert events: In defense of a pro-verb analysis". Lingua. 245. doi:10.1016/j.lingua.2020.102921.
- Eriksson, Olof (2008-11-28). "A contrastive study of proverbalization". Languages in Contrast. 8 (2). John Benjamins Publishing Company: 235–261. doi:10.1075/lic.8.2.06eri. ISSN 1387-6759.
- Fedyuneva, G. V. (2011). "О статусе местоглаголия в языке" [On the language status of a pro-verb]. Вопросы языкознания [Topics in Linguistics] (in Russian) (2): 89–96. Archived from the original on 7 November 2016.
- García-Castanyer, María Teresa (1992). "Le verbe <FAIRE>, pro-verbe et verbe opérateur, dans quelques textes sur la langue frangaise du XVIIe au XIXe siecles". Anales de filología Francesa (in French) (4): 43–55.
- Levin, Yu. I. (1998). "Об обсценных выражениях русского языка" [On the obscene expressions in Russian language]. Избранные труды. Поэтика. Семиотика [Selected Works. Poetics. Semiotics] (in Russian). Moscow. pp. 809–819. Archived from the original on 29 November 2014.
- Viberg, Åke (2006). "What One Verb Can Do: The Swedish Verb göra in a Crosslinguistic Perspective". Finnish Journal of Linguistics (19): 243–257.
- Zhang, Bojiang (2014). "从 "来" 的代动词用法谈汉语句法语义的修辞属性" [On the rhetorical attributes of Chinese syntax and semantics from the pro-verb usage of "来"] (PDF). 当代修辞学 [Contemporary Rhetoric] (in Chinese) (4).
