= Subject–verb–object word order =

Sentence structure; the default word order in English

In linguistic typology, subject–verb–object (SVO) is a sentence structure where the subject comes first, the verb second, and the object third. Languages may be classified according to the dominant sequence of these elements in unmarked sentences (i.e., sentences in which an unusual word order is not used for emphasis). English is included in this group. An example is "Sam ate apples."

SVO is the second-most common order by number of known languages, after subject–object–verb (SOV). Together, SVO and SOV account for more than 87% of the world's languages, while the three "subject before object" orders make up almost 96%. The label SVO often includes ergative languages although they do not have nominative subjects.

Order	Example	Usage	Languages
SOV	"Sam apples ate."	45%	Ainu, Akkadian, Amharic, Ancient Greek, Armenian, Aymara, Bambara, Basque, Bengali, Burmese, Burushaski, Chukchi, Cushitic languages, Dravidian languages, Elamite, Hindustani, Hittite, Hopi, Itelmen, Japanese, Korean, Kurdish, Kurukh, Latin, Lhasa Tibetan, Manchu, Mongolian, Munda languages, Nahuatl, Navajo, Nepali, Nivkh, Northeast Caucasian languages, Northwest Caucasian languages, Pali, Pashto, Persian, Quechua, Sanskrit, Sinhala, Siouan-Catawban languages, Tamil, Tigrinya, Turkic languages, Yukaghir
SVO	"Sam ate apples."	42%	Arabic (modern spoken varieties), Chinese (Mandarin, Cantonese, etc.), English, Estonian, Finnish, Hausa, Hebrew, Indonesian, Kashmiri, Malay, most European languages, Pa'O, Swahili, Thai, Vietnamese, Yucatec Maya
VSO	"Ate Sam apples."	9%	Arabic (classical and modern standard), Berber languages, Biblical Hebrew, Celtic languages, Filipino, Geʽez, Kariri, Mayan languages, Polynesian languages
VOS	"Ate apples Sam."	3%	Algonquian languages, Arawakan languages, Car, Chumash, Fijian, K'iche, Malagasy, Otomanguean languages, Qʼeqchiʼ, Salishan languages, Terêna
OVS	"Apples ate Sam."	1%	Äiwoo, Hixkaryana, Urarina
OSV	"Apples Sam ate."	0%	Haida, Tobati, Warao
Frequency distribution of word order in languages surveyed by Russell S. Tomlin in the 1980s

== Properties ==
Subject–verb–object languages almost always place relative clauses after the nouns which they modify and adverbial subordinators before the clause modified, with varieties of Chinese being notable exceptions.

Although some subject–verb–object languages in West Africa, the best known being Ewe, use postpositions in noun phrases, the vast majority of them, such as English, have prepositions. Most subject–verb–object languages place genitives after the noun, but a significant minority, including the postpositional SVO languages of West Africa, the Hmong–Mien languages, some Sino-Tibetan languages, and European languages like Swedish, Danish, Lithuanian, and Latvian have prenominal genitives (as would be expected in an SOV language).

Non-European SVO languages usually have a strong tendency to place adjectives, demonstratives, and numerals after the nouns that they modify, but Chinese, Vietnamese, Malaysian, and Indonesian place numerals before nouns, as in English. Some linguists have come to view the numeral as the head in the relationship to fit the rigid right-branching of these languages.

There is a strong tendency, as in English, for main verbs to be preceded by auxiliaries: I am thinking. He should reconsider.

== Language differences and variation ==
An example of SVO order in English is:

Andy ate cereal.

In an analytic language such as English, subject–verb–object order is relatively inflexible because it identifies which part of the sentence is the subject and which one is the object. ("The dog bit Andy" and "Andy bit the dog" mean two completely different things, while, in case of "Bit Andy the dog", it may be difficult to determine whether it is a complete sentence or a fragment, with "Andy the dog" the object and an omitted/implied subject.)

The situation is more complex in languages that have no strict order of V and O imposed by their grammar. e.g. Russian, Finnish, Ukrainian, Hungarian, or Swedish. Here, the ordering is rather governed by emphasis.

Russian allows the use of subject, verb, and object in any order and "shuffles" parts to bring up a slightly different contextual meaning each time. E.g. "любит она его" (loves she him) may be used to point out "she acts this way because she LOVES him", or "его она любит" (him she loves) is used in the context "if you pay attention, you'll see that HE is the one she truly loves", or "его любит она" (him loves she) may appear along the lines "I agree that cat is a disaster, but since my wife adores it and I adore her...". Regardless of order, it is clear that "его" is the object because it is in the accusative case.

In Polish, SVO order is basic in an affirmative sentence, and a different order is used to either emphasize some part of it or to adapt it to a broader context logic. For example, "Roweru ci nie kupię" (I won't buy you a bicycle), "Od piątej czekam" (I've been waiting since five).

In Turkish, it is normal to use SOV, but SVO may be used sometimes to emphasize the verb. For example, "John terk etti Mary'yi" (Lit. John/left/Mary: John left Mary) is the answer to the question "What did John do with Mary?" instead of the regular [SOV] sentence "John Mary'yi terk etti" (Lit. John/Mary/left).

Swedish, while generally SVO, also allows flexibility in word order for emphasis or topicalization. For example, ”Sam åt äpplen” (“Sam ate apples”) follows the canonical SVO order, but ”Äpplen åt Sam” is also grammatically correct, placing emphasis on the object. This flexibility is facilitated by the verb-second (V2) constraint and the grammatical markings on verbs, which maintain clarity of meaning despite variations in word order.

German, Dutch, and Kashmiri display the order subject-verb-object in some, especially main clauses, but really are verb-second languages, not SVO languages in the sense of a word order type. They have SOV in subordinate clauses, as given in Example 1 below. Example 2 shows the effect of verb second order: the first element in the clause that comes before the V need not be the subject. In Kashmiri, the word order in embedded clauses is conditioned by the category of the subordinating conjunction, as in Example 3.

1. "Er weiß, dass ich jeden Sonntag das Auto wasche."/"Hij weet dat ik elke zondag de auto was." (German & Dutch respectively: "He knows that I wash the car each Sunday", lit. "He knows that I each Sunday the car wash".) Cf. the simple sentence "Ich wasche das Auto jeden Sonntag."/ "Ik was de auto elke zondag.", "I wash the car each Sunday."
2. "Jeden Sonntag wasche ich das Auto."/"Elke zondag was ik de auto." (German & Dutch respectively: "Each Sunday I wash the car.", lit. "Each Sunday wash I the car."). "Ich wasche das Auto jeden Sonntag"/"Ik was de auto elke zondag" translates perfectly into English "I wash the car each Sunday", but preposing the adverbial results in a structure that is different from the English one.
3. Kashmiri:

mye ees phyikyir yithi.ni tsi temyis ciThy dyikh
to.me was worry lest you to.him letter will.give
"I was afraid you might give him the letter"

If the embedded clause is introduced by the transparent conjunction zyi the SOV order changes to SVO. "mye ees phyikyir (zyi) tsi maa dyikh temyis ciThy".

English developed from such a reordering language and still bears traces of this word order, for example in locative inversion ("In the garden sat a cat.", "Here Comes the Sun", "There appeared before me..., Dexter E. Clapp...") and some clauses beginning with negative expressions: "only" ("Only then do we find X."), "not only" ("Not only did he storm away but also slammed the door."), "under no circumstances" ("under no circumstances are the students allowed to use a mobile phone"), "never" ("Never have I done that."), "on no account" and the like. In such cases, do-support is sometimes required, depending on the construction.

SVO order is permitted in Ho, although the predominant clausal constituent order of the language is SOV. For example:

tʃimiŋ hoːko jagar-tan-a ho kaji
how.many people speak-MID.PROG-IND Ho language?
'How many people speak Ho language?'

== See also ==
- Subject–object–verb word order
- Object–subject–verb word order
- Object–verb–subject word order
- Verb–object–subject word order
- Verb–subject–object word order
- V2 word order
- Category:Subject–verb–object languages
