= West Frisian grammar =

West Germanic language grammar

The grammar of the West Frisian language, a West Germanic language spoken mostly in the province of Friesland (Fryslân) in the north of the Netherlands, is similar to other West Germanic languages, most notably Dutch. West Frisian is more analytic than its ancestor language Old Frisian, largely abandoning the latter's case system. It features two genders and inflects nouns in the singular and plural numbers.

Verbs inflect for person, number, mood, and tense, though many forms are formed using periphrastic constructions. There are two conjugations of weak verbs, in addition to strong and irregular verbs.

== Nouns ==
=== Gender ===
In West Frisian there are two grammatical genders for nouns: the common gender (de-words), and the neuter gender (it-words). All plural nouns and common singular nouns take the definite article de, while singular neuter nouns take the definite article it. Regardless of gender, all nouns take the indefinite article in.

	Common	Neuter
Definite singular	de	it
Definite plural	de	
Indefinite singular	in	

=== Number ===
West Frisian nouns inflect for two numbers: singular and plural. There are two productive suffixes used to form the plural: "-(e)n" and "-s". The suffix "-(e)n" is used for nouns in which the final syllable is stressed. The suffix "-s" is appended to plural nouns that end (in the singular) with unstressed syllables "-el", "-em", "-en", "-er", "-ert", "-ier", "-mer", "-ter", "-ster", "-sje". It also appears after the diminutive suffixes "-je", "-ke", and "-tsje", or as "-'s" at the end of many borrowed words.

- wurd "word" → wurden
- boarne "source" → boarnen
- doar "door" → doarren
- see "sea" → seeën
- hoekje "little hook" → hoekjes
- skrapke "comma" → skrapkes
- provinsje "province" → provinsjes
- tv "TV" → tv's

In rare cases, usually with nouns that generally come in pairs, a "double plural" is used, where both suffixes appear.

- reed "skate" → redens
- lears "boot" → learzens

A few nouns have irregular plural forms:

- bern "child" → bern
- skiep "sheep" → skiep
- ko "cow" → kij
- skoech "shoe" → skuon
- dei "day" → dagen
- wei "way" → wegen
- lid "member" → leden
- âlder "parent, elder" → âlden
- man "man" → manlju
- frou "woman" → froulju

=== Diminutive ===
In West Frisian, there are three productive diminutive suffixes: "-je", "-ke", and "-tsje". The first of these three is used with nouns that end with the sounds /x/, /ɣ/, /k/ and /ŋ/, "-tsje" with nouns that end with /d/, /l/, /n/ and /t/, and "-ke" with all other sounds.

- stik "piece" → stikje
- esk "ash (tree)" → eskje
- bult "pile" → bultsje
- hart "deer" → hartsje
- aai "egg" → aike
- hynder "horse" → hynderke

All nouns that are derived as diminutives are neuter and take the ending "-s" when pluralizing.

=== Case ===
Old Frisian's system of four grammatical cases (nominative, genitive, dative and accusative) has not survived in modern West Frisian. The only remainder of the old declension system is the genitive case suffix "-s", which is used to denote possession.

The genitive form may be "-(e)" or "-(e)s".

The ending "-(e)" ("-e" or zero) is used with monosyllabic nouns ending with a consonant or the vowel "-e". Also, it may be used with kinship terms and some plural nouns, mostly in idiomatic, fixed expressions: Ruerde mêm "Ruerd's mom", memme mûs "mom's mouse", fammene pronkjen "the girls' talk".

In most other cases, the "-(e)s" ending is used: har mans bern "her man's child(ren)", Fryslâns wâlden "Friesland's forests".

In the spoken language, genitive forms are rare and are normally replaced by analytical constructions with the preposition "fan (of)" or a possessive pronoun: de heit fan Anneke "Anneke's father", Anneke har heit (-//-, lit. "Anneke her father").

== Adjectives ==
=== Inflected forms ===
Adjectives in West Frisian have a "base" and an "inflected" form. The inflected form consists of the base form of the adjective and the suffix "-e". Adjectives are inflected when they are used in pronominal position before a definitely articulated neuter noun, any plural noun, or any common noun.

	Common		Neuter	
	Definite	Indefinite	Definite	Indefinite
Singular	Inflected	Inflected	Inflected	Uninflected
Plural	Inflected	Inflected	Inflected	Inflected

De wite kat "the white cat" (common, singular, definite)

It lytse famke "the little girl" (neuter, singular, definite)

In lyts famke "a little girl" (neuter, singular, indefinite)

=== Comparative and superlative ===
There are three degrees of adjectives: positive, comparative, and superlative. The positive is the base form of the adjective, the comparative degree is formed with the suffix "-er", and the superlative degree is formed with the suffix "-ste" and the definite article. If the base form of the adjective ends in /r/ or sometimes /l/ or /n/, then there is an obligatory /d/ inserted before the comparative suffix "-er". Thus, the degrees for the adjective fyn "fine" look as such:

Positive	Comparative	Superlative
fyn	fynder	de/it fynste

The comparative and superlative forms can also be formed with the words mear and meast, though this is far rarer than in English and usually only occurs with adjectives that would be hard to pronounce if formed regularly or already end in "-er" or "-st". Also rarely, an even higher superlative degree can be formed with the prefix "alder-" alongside the suffix "-ste", as in the phrase de aldergrutst "the very biggest".

== Verbs ==
West Frisian verbs inflect for person, number, tense, and mood.

There are only two inflected tenses, present and past. Other tenses are formed using auxiliary and modal verbs.

There are also only two moods, indicative and imperative, with the imperative only being used in the second person.

There are 3 groups of verbs: weak, strong and irregular verbs. Strong verbs are those that change to past tense with ablaut, i.e. a change in the stem vowel. Weak verbs follow one of two paradigms, depending on whether their ending is "-e" or "-je".

=== Weak -e verbs ===
	-e infinitive: pakk^{1}e				-n infinitive: pakken
	Present tense				Past tense
person	singular		plural		singular		plural
1st	ik	pak	wy	pakk^{1}e	ik	pakt^{2}e	wy	pakt^{2}en
2nd	do/dû	pakst	jimme	pakk^{1}e	do/dû	pakt^{2}est	jimme	pakt^{2}en
3rd	hy/sy/it	pakt	hja	pakk^{1}e	hy/sy/it	pakt^{2}e	hja	pakt^{2}en
	Present participle		Imperative		Auxiliary		Past participle
	pakk^{1}end		pak		hawwe		pakt^{2}

^{1} If necessary a consonant at the end of the stem is doubled to avoid a change of the pronunciation of the preceding syllable.
^{2} An unvoiced consonant at the end of the stem takes an unvoiced dental suffix; a voiced consonant takes a voiced dental.

=== Weak -je verbs ===
	-e infinitive: wurkje				-n infinitive: wurkjen
	Present tense				Past tense
person	singular		plural		singular		plural
1st	ik	wurkje	wy	wurkje	ik	wurke	wy	wurken
2nd	do/dû	wurkest	jimme	wurkje	do/dû	wurkest	jimme	wurken
3rd	hy/sy/it	wurket	hja	wurkje	hy/sy/it	wurke	hja	wurken
	Present participle		Imperative		Auxiliary		Past participle
	wurkjend		wurkje		hawwe		wurke

=== Irregular verbs ===
==== Hawwe – To Have ====
	-e infinitive: hawwe				-n infinitive: hawwen
	Present tense				Past tense
person	singular		plural		singular		plural
1st	ik	ha	wy	hawwe	ik	hie	wy	hienen
2nd	do/dû	hast	jimme	hawwe	do/dû	hiest	jimme	hienen
3rd	hy/sy/it	hat	hja	hawwe	hy/sy/it	hie	hja	hienen
	Present participle		Imperative		Auxiliary		Past participle
	hawwend		haw		hawwe		hân

==== Wêze – To Be ====
	-e infinitive: wêze				-n infinitive: wêzen
	Present tense				Past tense
person	singular		plural		singular		plural
1st	ik	bin	wy	binne	ik	wie	wy	wienen
2nd	do/dû	bist	jimme	binne	do/dû	wiest	jimme	wienen
3rd	hy/sy/it	is	hja	binne	hy/sy/it	wie	hja	wienen
	Present participle		Imperative		Auxiliary		Past participle
	wêzend		wês		hawwe		west

==== Gean – To Go ====
	infinitive: gean
	Present tense				Past tense
person	singular		plural		singular		plural
1st	ik	gean	wy	geane	ik	gie, gong, gyng	wy	gienen, gongen, gyngen
2nd	do/dû	giest	jimme	geane	do/dû	giest, gongst, gyngst	jimme	gienen, gongen, gyngen
3rd	hy/sy/it	giet	hja	geane	hy/sy/it	gie, gong, gyng	hja	gienen, gongen, gyngen
	Present participle		Imperative		Auxiliary		Past participle
	geanend		gean		wêze		gien, gongen
