= Inverse copular constructions =

Type of grammatical construction

In linguistics, inverse copular constructions, named after Moro (1997), are a type of inversion in English where canonical SCP word order (subject-copula-predicative expression, e.g. Fred is the plumber) is reversed in a sense, so that one appears to have the order PCS instead (predicative expression-copula-subject, e.g. The plumber is Fred). The verb in these constructions is always the copula be (am, are, is, was, were). Inverse copular constructions are intriguing because they render the distinction between subject and predicative expression difficult to maintain. The confusion has led to focused study of these constructions, and their impact on the theory of grammar may be great since they appear to challenge the initial binary division of the sentence (S) into a subject noun phrase (NP) and a predicate verb phrase (VP) (S → NP VP), this division being at the core of all phrase structure grammars (as opposed to dependency grammars, which do not acknowledge the binary division).

== Examples ==
Inverse copular constructions involve nouns and noun phrases, but they do not allow the post-copula nominal to be a personal pronoun:

a. The cause of the riot is a picture on the wall.
b. A picture on the wall is the cause of the riot. - Inverse copular construction
c. *A picture on the wall is it. - Post-verb subject cannot be a personal pronoun.

a. Fred is the plumber.
b. The plumber is Fred. - Inverse copular construction
c. *The plumber is he. - Post-verb subject cannot be a personal pronoun.

The defining trait of the inverse copular constructions is that two counts of inversion appear to have occurred: the normal subject has inverted to a post-verb position, and the predicative nominal has inverted to the pre-verb position. The verb is a finite form of the copula 'be' (am, are, is, was, were). This type of inversion is generally NOT possible with other verbs.

== Subject-verb agreement ==
Inverse copular constructions where the inverted predicative expression is a noun phrase are noteworthy in part because subject-verb agreement can (at least in English) be established with the pre-verb predicative NP as opposed to with the post-verb subject NP, e.g.

a. The pictures are a problem. - Canonical word order, standard subject-verb agreement
b. A problem is/^{??}are the pictures. - Inverse copular construction, subject-verb agreement reversed in a sense

a. Those kids are an annoyance. - Canonical word order, standard subject-verb agreement
b. An annoyance is/^{??}are those kids. - Inverse copular construction, subject-verb agreement reversed in a sense

In the inverse copular constructions, the copula agrees with the singular predicative expression to its left as opposed to with the plural subject to its right. This phenomenon seems to be limited to English (and possibly French); it does not occur in related languages such as German, e.g.

a. Die Bilder sind ein Problem. - Canonical subject-verb agreement

'The pictures are a problem.'

b. Ein Problem sind/*ist die Bilder. - Plural agreement with inverted subject maintained

'A problem are/is the pictures.'

Nor does it occur in some Romance languages, e.g. Italian:

a. Queste foto sono la causa della rivolta. - Canonical subject-verb agreement

'These photos are the cause of the revolt.'

b. La causa della rivolta sono/*è queste foto. - Plural agreement with inverted subject maintained

'The cause of the revolt are/is the photos.'

The fact that English (unlike German and Italian) demands subject-verb agreement to occur with the pre-verb NP generates confusion about what should qualify as the subject NP. From a morphological point of view, the pre-verb NP in inverse copular constructions should count as the subject, but from the perspective of information structure (e.g. definiteness, old information, specificity), the post-verb NP should be the subject.

== Importance for the theory of grammar ==
Inverse copular constructions challenge one of the major dogmas of the theory of clause or sentence structure, i.e. that the two basic constituents of a sentence - the noun phrase (NP) and the verb phrase (VP) - are associated with the logical/grammatical functions of subject and predicate (cf. phrase structure rules and sentence). In fact, copular sentences that maintain the canonical groupings are not adequate on empirical grounds, since a very unorthodox left-branching structure is necessary, or if one rejects the canonical groupings and positions the subject inside a VP-like constituent, then one has to assume that the subject NP and copula verb can form a type of VP to the exclusion of the predicative expression.

== See also ==
- Copula
- Dependency grammar
- Discontinuity
- Inversion
- Subject-auxiliary inversion
- Phrase structure grammar
- Predicate
- Predicative expression
- Subject-verb inversion
