= Do-support =

Using 'do' in negated clauses, questions, and other constructions

Do-support (sometimes referred to as do-insertion or periphrastic do) in English grammar is the use of the auxiliary verb do (or one of its inflected forms, e.g. does) to form negated clauses and constructions which require subject–auxiliary inversion, such as questions.

The verb do can be used optionally as an auxiliary even in simple declarative sentences, usually as a means of adding emphasis (e.g. "I did shut the fridge."). However, in negated and inverted clauses, do is usually used in today's Modern English. For example, in idiomatic English, the negating word not cannot attach directly to just any finite lexical verb; rather, it can only attach to an auxiliary or copular verb. For example, the sentence I am not with the copula be is fully idiomatic, but I know not with the finite lexical verb know, while grammatical, is archaic. If there is no other auxiliary present when negation is required, the auxiliary do is used to produce a form like I do not (don't) know. The same applies in clauses requiring inversion, including most questions: inversion must involve the subject and an auxiliary verb, so it is not idiomatic to say Know you him?; today's English usually substitutes Do you know him?

Do-support is not used when there is already an auxiliary or copular verb present or with non-finite verb forms (infinitives and participles). It is sometimes used with subjunctive forms. Furthermore, the use of do as an auxiliary should be distinguished from the use of do as a normal lexical verb, as in They do their homework.

== Common uses ==
Do-support appears to accommodate a number of varying grammatical constructions:

1. question formation,
2. the appearance of the negation not, and
3. negative inversion.

These constructions often cannot occur without do-support or the presence of some other auxiliary verb.

=== In questions ===
The presence of an auxiliary (or copular) verb allows subject–auxiliary inversion to take place, as is required in most interrogative sentences in English. If there is already an auxiliary or copula present, do-support is not required when forming questions:

- He will laugh. → Will he laugh? (the auxiliary will inverts with the subject he)
- She is at home. → Is she at home? (the copula is inverts with the subject she)

This applies not only in yes–no questions but also in questions formed using interrogative words:

- When will he laugh?

However, if there is no auxiliary or copula present, inversion requires the introduction of an auxiliary in the form of do-support:

- I know. → Do I know? (Compare: *Know I? (Note: This article uses asterisks to indicate ungrammatical examples.))
- He laughs. → Does he laugh? (Compare: *Laughs he?)
- She came home. → Did she come home? (Compare: *Came she home?)

The finite (inflected) verb is now the auxiliary do; the following verb is a bare infinitive which does not inflect: does he laugh? (not laughs); did she come? (not came).

In negated questions, the negating word not may appear either following the subject or attached to the auxiliary in the contracted form n't. This applies to both do-support and other auxiliaries:

- Why are you not playing? / Why aren't you playing?
- Do you not want to try? / Don't you want to try?

The above principles do not apply to wh-questions if the interrogative word is the subject or part of the subject. Then, there is no inversion and so there is no need for do-support: Who lives here?, Whose dog bit you?

The verb have, in the sense of possession, is sometimes used without do-support as if it were an auxiliary, but this is considered dated. The version with do-support is also correct:

- Have you any idea what is going on here?
- Do you have any idea what is going on here?
- (Have you got any idea what is going on here? – the order is similar to the first example, but have is an auxiliary verb here)

For elliptical questions and tag questions, see the elliptical sentences section below.

=== With not ===
In the same way that the presence of an auxiliary allows question formation, the appearance of the negating word not is allowed as well. Then too, if no other auxiliary or copular verb is present, do-support is required.

- He will laugh. → He will not laugh. (not attaches to the auxiliary will)
- She laughs. → She does not laugh. (not attaches to the added auxiliary does)

In the second sentence, do-support is required because idiomatic Modern English does not allow forms like *She laughs not. The verb have, in the sense of possession, is sometimes negated thus:

- I haven't the foggiest idea.

Most combinations of auxiliary/copula plus not have a contracted form ending in suffix -n't, such as isn't, won't, etc. The relevant contractions for negations formed using do-support are don't, doesn't and didn't. Such forms are used very frequently in informal English.

Do-support is required for negated imperatives even when the verb is the copula be:

- Do not do that.
- Don't be silly.

However, there is no do-support with non-finite verb forms, as they are negated by a preceding not:

- It would be a crime not to help him. (the infinitive to help is negated)
- Not knowing what else to do, I stood my ground. (the present participle knowing is negated)
- Not eating vegetables can harm your health. (the gerund eating is negated)

With subjunctive verb forms, such as a present subjunctive, do is infrequently used for negation, which is frequently considered ambiguous or incorrect because it resembles the indicative. The usual method to negate the present subjunctive is to precede the verb with a not, especially if it is be (since using do-support with it, whether indicative or subjunctive, is ungrammatical):

- I suggest that he not receive any more funding. (the present subjunctive receive is negated)
- It is important that he not be there. (the present subjunctive be is negated)

As a past subjunctive, however, did is needed for negation (unless the verb is be, whose past subjunctive is were):

- I wish that he did not know it.
- I wish that he were not here.

The negation in the examples negates the non-finite predicate. Compare the following competing formulations:

- I did not try to laugh. vs. I tried not to laugh.
- They do not want to go. vs. They want not to go.

There are two predicates in each of the verb chains in the sentences. Do-support is needed when the higher of the two is negated; it is not needed to negate the lower nonfinite predicate.

For negated questions, see the questions section above. For negated elliptical sentences, see the elliptical sentences section below.

=== Negative inversion ===
The same principles as for question formation apply to other clauses in which subject–auxiliary inversion is required, particularly after negative expressions and expressions involving only (negative inversion):

- Never did he run that fast again. (wrong: *Never he did run that fast again. *Never ran he that fast again.)
- Only here do I feel at home. (wrong: *Only here feel I at home.)

== Further uses ==
In addition to providing do-support in questions and negative clauses, the auxiliary verb do can also appear in contexts where it is not grammatically required. In such cases, its use often serves pragmatic functions, such as emphasis or contrast.

=== For emphasis ===
The auxiliary generally appears for purposes of emphasis, for instance to establish a contrast or to express a correction:

- Did Bill eat his breakfast? Yes, he did eat his breakfast. (did emphasizes the positive answer, which may be unexpected)
- Bill doesn't sing, then. No, he does sing. (does emphasizes the correction of the previous statement)

As before, the main verb following the auxiliary becomes a bare infinitive, which is not inflected (one cannot say *did ate or *does sings in the above examples).

As with typical do-support, that usage of do does not occur with other auxiliaries or a copular verb. Then, emphasis can be obtained by adding stress to the auxiliary or copular:

- Would you take the risk? Yes, I would take the risk.
- Bill isn't singing, then. No, he is singing.

(Some auxiliaries change their pronunciation when stressed, such as can /kən/ → /kæn/; see Weak and strong forms in English.)

In negative sentences, emphasis can be obtained by adding stress either to the negating word (if used in full) or to the contracted form ending in n't. That applies whether or not do-support is used:

- I wouldn't (or would not) take the risk.
- They don't (or do not) appear on the list.

Emphatic do can also be used with imperatives, including with the copula be:

- Do take care! Do be careful!

=== In elliptical sentences ===
The auxiliary do is also used in various types of elliptical sentences, where the main verb is omitted. (It can be said to be "understood", usually because it would be the same verb as was used in a preceding sentence or clause.) That includes the following types:

- Tag questions:
  - He plays well, doesn't he?
  - You don't like Sara, do you?
- Elliptical questions:
  - I like pasta. Do you?
  - I went to the party. Why didn't you?
- Elliptical answers:
  - Do you want to come along? — I do. (emphasis on do)
  - Who took the car? — He did. (emphasis on he)
- Elliptical statements:
  - They swam, but I didn't.
  - He looks smart, and so do you.
  - You fell asleep, and I did, too.

Such uses include cases that do-support would have been used in a complete clause (questions, negatives, inversion) but also cases that (as in the last example) the complete clause would normally have been constructed without do (I fell asleep too). In such instances do may be said to be acting as a pro-verb since it effectively takes the place of a verb or verb phrase: did substitutes for fell asleep.

As in the principal cases of do-support, do does not normally occur when there is already an auxiliary or copula present; the auxiliary or copula is retained in the elliptical sentence:

- He is playing well, isn't he?
- I can cook pasta. Can you?
- You should get some sleep, and I should too.

However, it is possible to use do as a pro-verb (see below section #Pro-verbs and do-so substitution) even after auxiliaries in some dialects:

- Have you put the shelf up yet? — I haven't done (or I haven't), but I will do (or I will).

(However it is not normally used in this way as a to-infinitive: Have you put the shelf up? I plan to, rather than *I plan to do; or as a passive participle: Was it built? Yes, it was, not *Yes, it was done.)

Pro-verbal uses of do are also found in the imperative:

- Please do. — Don't!

=== Pro-verbs and do-so substitution ===
The phrases do so and do what for questions are pro-verb forms in English. They can be used as substitutes for verbs in X-bar theory grammar to test verb phrase completeness. Bare infinitive forms often are used in place of the missing pro-verb forms.

Examples from Santorini and Kroch:

| Type | Sample | Sample with replacement |
|---|---|---|
| Substitution | She will write a book. | She will do so. |
| Substitution | The two boys could order tuna salad sandwiches. | The two boys could do so. |
| Question/short answer | What will she do? | Write a book. |
| Question/short answer | What could the two boys do? | Order tuna salad sandwiches. |

==== Tests for constituenthood of a verb-phrase in X'-grammar ====
The do-so construction can be used to test if a verb-phrase is a constituent phrase in X'-grammar by substitution similarly to how other pro-forms can be used to test for noun-phrases, etc.

In X-bar theory, the verb-phrase projects three bar-levels such as this:

An example from Santorini and Kroch using a simple sentence:

After the do-so construction substitution

== Use of do as main verb ==
Apart from its uses as an auxiliary, the verb do (with its inflected forms does, did, done, doing) can be used as an ordinary lexical verb (main verb):

- Do your homework!
- What are you doing?

Like other non-auxiliary verbs, do cannot be directly negated with not and cannot participate in inversion so it may itself require do-support, with both auxiliary and lexical instances of do appearing together:

- They didn't do the laundry on Sunday. (did is the auxiliary, do is the main verb)
- Why do you do karate? (the first do is the auxiliary, the second is the main verb)
- How do you do? (a set phrase used as a polite greeting)

== Meaning contribution ==
In the various cases seen above that require do-support, the auxiliary verb do makes no apparent contribution to the meaning of the sentence so it is sometimes called a dummy auxiliary. Historically, however, in Middle English, auxiliary do apparently had a meaning contribution, serving as a marker of aspect (probably perfective aspect, but in some cases, the meaning may have been imperfective). In Early Modern English, the semantic value was lost, and the usage of forms with do began to approximate that found today.

== Origins ==
Some form of auxiliary do occurs in all West Germanic languages except Afrikaans. It is generally accepted that the past tense of Germanic weak verbs (in English, -ed) was formed from a combination of the infinitive with a past tense form of do, as exemplified in Gothic. The origins of the construction in English are debated: some scholars argue it was already present in Old English, but not written due to stigmatization. Scholars disagree whether the construction arose from the use of do as a lexical verb in its own right, or whether periphrastic do arose from a causative meaning of the verb or vice versa. Examples of auxiliary do in Old English writing appear to be limited to its use in a causative sense, which is parallel to the earliest uses in other West Germanic languages.

Some scholars, such as linguist John McWhorter, argue that the construction arose via the influence of Celtic speakers; for instance Welsh uses the verb gwneud 'to do' to optionally form periphrastic alternatives to inflected verbs (with no difference in meaning). Others contend that the construction arose as a form of creolization when native speakers addressed foreigners and children.

== See also ==
- English verbs
- English clause syntax
- Intensifier
