= Hypothetical mood =

Epistemic grammatical mood

Hypothetical mood (abbreviated HYP) is an epistemic grammatical mood found in some languages (for example Lakota) which indicates that while a statement is not actually true, it could easily have been. For instance, in English, "You know you shouldn't play with knives! You could have hurt someone!" conveys a meaning that would be expressed with the hypothetical mood in Lakota.
