= Deductive mood =

Epistemic grammatical mood

The deductive mood is an epistemic grammatical mood that indicates that the truth of the statement was deduced from other information, rather than being directly known. In English, deductive mood is often indicated by the word must, which is also used for many other purposes. By contrast, some other languages have special words or verb affixes to indicate deductive mood specifically.

An example in English:
I can smell gas in the house! Someone must have left the stove on!
(deductive indicated by must)
