= Subject (grammar) =

Part of a sentence

A subject is one of the two main parts of a sentence (the other being the predicate, which modifies the subject).

For the simple sentence John runs, John is the subject, a person or thing about whom the statement is made.

Traditionally the subject is the word or phrase which controls the verb in the clause, that is to say with which the verb agrees (John is but John and Mary are). If there is no verb, as in Nicola – what an idiot!, or if the verb has a different subject, as in John – I can't stand him!, then 'John' is not considered to be the grammatical subject, but can be described as the topic of the sentence.

While these definitions apply to simple English sentences, defining the subject is more difficult in more complex sentences and languages. For example, in the sentence It is difficult to learn French, the subject seems to be the word it, and yet arguably the real subject (the thing that is difficult) is to learn French. A sentence such as It was John who broke the window is more complex still. Sentences beginning with a locative phrase, such as There is a problem, isn't there?, in which the tag question isn't there? seems to imply that the subject is the adverb there, also create difficulties for the definition of subject.

In languages such as Latin and German the subject of a verb has a form which is known as the nominative case: for example, the form 'he' (not 'him' or 'his') is used in sentences such as he ran, He broke the window, He is a teacher, He was hit by a motorist. But there are some languages such as Basque or Greenlandic, in which the form of a noun or pronoun when the verb is intransitive (he ran) is different from when the verb is transitive (he broke the window). In these languages, which are known as ergative languages, the concept of subject may not apply at all.

== Technical definition ==
The subject (glossing abbreviations: SUB or SU) is, according to a tradition that can be traced back to Aristotle (and that is associated with phrase structure grammars), one of the two main constituents of a clause, the other constituent being the predicate, whereby the predicate says something about the subject. According to a tradition associated with predicate logic and dependency grammars, the subject is the most prominent overt argument of the predicate. By this position all languages with arguments have subjects, though there is no way to define this consistently for all languages. Even in languages such as English, there is not always a perfect match between the semantic predicand and the subject, as a predicate may be predicated on an argument in another clause (see raising).

From a functional perspective, a subject is a phrase that conflates nominative case with the topic. Many languages (such as those with ergative or Austronesian alignment) do not do this, and by this definition would not have subjects.

All of these positions see the subject determining person and number agreement on the finite verb, as exemplified by the difference in verb forms between he eats and they eat. The stereotypical subject immediately precedes the finite verb in declarative sentences and represents an agent or a theme. The subject is often a multi-word constituent and should be distinguished from parts of speech, which, roughly, classify words within constituents.

In the example sentences below, the subjects are indicated in boldface.

1. **The dictionary** helps me find words.
2. Strangely enough, **ice cream** appeared on the table.
3. **The man who is sitting over there** told me that he just bought a ticket to Tahiti.
4. **Nothing else** is good enough.
5. **That nothing else is good enough** shouldn't come as a surprise.
6. **To eat six different kinds of vegetables a day** is healthy.
7. Despite her objections, **he** sold us ten bags of clothes.

== Forms of the subject in English ==
The subject is a constituent that can be realized in numerous forms. The following table lists the many forms that they may take in English:

Noun (phrase) or pronoun	The large car stopped outside our house.
A gerund (phrase)	His constant hammering was annoying.
A to-infinitive (phrase)	To read is easier than to write.
A full that-clause	That he had traveled the world was known to everyone.
A free relative clause	Whatever he did was always of interest.
A direct quotation	I love you is often heard these days.
Zero (but implied) subject	Take out the trash!
An expletive	It is raining.
A cataphoric it	It was known to everyone that he had traveled the world.
A prepositional phrase	After lunch is too late.

== Criteria for identifying subjects ==
There are several criteria for identifying subjects:

1. Subject-verb agreement: In languages with subject-verb agreement, the subject may agree with the finite verb in various ways, such as in person and number, e.g. I am vs. *I is.
2. Position occupied: The subject's position relative to the verb is set depending on the word order of the language. For example, in English, an SVO language, subjects precede the finite verb in declarative clauses, e.g. Tom laughs.
3. Semantic role: A typical subject in the active voice is an agent or theme, i.e. it performs the action expressed by the verb or when it is a theme, it receives a property assigned to it by the predicate.

Of these three criteria, the first one (agreement) is the most reliable. The subject agrees with the finite verb in person and number (and sometimes in gender as well). The second and third criterion are merely strong tendencies that can be flouted in certain constructions, e.g.

1. Tom is studying chemistry. - The three criteria agree identifying Tom as the subject.
2. Is Tom studying chemistry? - The 1st and the 3rd criteria identify Tom as the subject.
3. Chemistry is being studied (by Tom). - The 1st and the 2nd criteria identify Chemistry as the subject.

In the first sentence, all three criteria combine to identify Tom as the subject. In the second sentence, which involves the subject-auxiliary inversion of a yes/no-question, the subject immediately follows the finite verb (instead of immediately preceding it), which means the second criterion is flouted. And in the third sentence expressed in the passive voice, the 1st and the 2nd criterion combine to identify chemistry as the subject, whereas the third criterion suggests that by Tom could be the subject of the verb if it were changed to its active form (i.e. Tom is studying Chemistry) because Tom is an agent.

4. Morphological case: In languages that have case systems, the subject is marked by a specific case, often the nominative.
5. Omission: Many languages systematically omit a subject that is known in discourse.

The fourth criterion is better applicable to other languages, the exception being the subject and object forms of pronouns, I/me, he/him, she/her, they/them.

The fifth criterion is helpful in languages that typically drop pronominal subjects, such as Spanish, Portuguese, Italian, Latin, Greek, Japanese, and Mandarin. Though most of these languages are rich in verb forms for determining the person and number of the subject, Japanese and Mandarin have no such forms at all. In other languages, like English and French, most clauses should have a subject, which should be either a noun (phrase), a pronoun, or a clause. This is also true when the clause has no element to be represented by it. This is why verbs like rain must have a subject such as it, even if nothing is actually being represented by it. In this case, it is an expletive and a dummy pronoun. In imperative clauses, most languages elide the subject, even in languages which typically requires a subject to be present, e.g.

- Give it to me.
- Dā mihi istud. (Latin)
- Me dá isso. (Brazilian Portuguese)
- Dá-me isso. (European Portuguese)
- Dámelo. (Spanish)
- Dammelo. (Italian)

== Coordinated sentences ==
One criterion for identifying a subject in various languages is the possibility of its omission in coordinated sentences such as the following: The man hit the woman and [the man] came here.

In a passive construction, the patient becomes the subject by this criterion: The woman was hit by the man and [the woman] came here.

In ergative languages such as the nearly extinct Australian language Dyirbal, in a transitive sentence it is the patient rather than the agent that can be omitted in such sentences: Balan d^{y}ugumbil baŋgul yaraŋgu balgan, banin^{y}u 'The man (bayi yara) hit the woman (balan d^{y}ugumbil) and [she] came here'

This suggests that in ergative languages of this kind the patient is actually the subject in a transitive sentence.

== Difficult cases in English ==
There are certain constructions that challenge the criteria just introduced for identifying subjects in English. The following subsections briefly illustrate two such cases: 1) existential there-constructions, and 2) inverse copular constructions.

=== Existential there-constructions ===
Existential there-constructions allow for varying interpretations about what should count as the subject, e.g.

1. There's problems.
2. There are problems.

In sentence 1, the first criterion (agreement) and the second criterion (position occupied) suggest that there is the subject, whereas the third criterion (semantic role) suggests rather that problems is the subject. In sentence 2, in contrast, agreement and semantic role suggest that problems is the subject, whereas position occupied suggests that there is the subject. In such cases then, one can take the first criterion as the most telling; the subject should agree with the finite verb.

=== Inverse copular constructions ===
Another difficult case for identifying the subject is the so-called inverse copular constructions, e.g.

1. The boys are a chaotic force around here.
2. A chaotic force around here is the boys. - Inverse copular construction

The criteria combine to identify the boys as the subject in sentence 1. But if that is the case, then one might argue that the boys is also the subject in the similar sentence 2, even though two of the criteria (agreement and position occupied) suggest that a chaotic force around here is the subject. When confronted with such data, one has to make a decision that is less than fully arbitrary. If one assumes again that criterion one (agreement) is the most reliable, one can usually identify a subject.

== Subject-less clauses ==
The existence of subject-less clauses can be construed as particularly problematic for theories of sentence structure that build on the binary subject-predicate division. A simple sentence is defined as the combination of a subject and a predicate, but if no subject is present, how can one have a sentence? Subject-less clauses are absent from English for the most part, but they are not unusual in related languages. In German, for instance, impersonal passive clauses can lack a recognizable subject, e.g.

Gestern wurde nur geschlafen.
yesterday was only slept
'Everybody slept yesterday.'

The word gestern 'yesterday' is generally construed as an adverb, which means it cannot be taken as the subject in this sentence. Certain verbs in German also require a dative or accusative object instead of a nominative subject, e.g.

Mir graut davor.
me-DAT {is uneasy} {about it}
'I am uneasy about it.'

Since subjects are typically marked by the nominative case in German (the fourth criterion above), one can argue that this sentence lacks a subject, for the relevant verb argument appears in the dative case, not in the nominative.

Impersonal sentences in Scottish Gaelic can occasionally have a very similar form to the first German example where an actor is omitted. In the following sentence, the word 'chaidh' ("went") is an auxiliary carrying tense and is used in an impersonal or passive constructions. The word 'falbh' ("leaving") is a verbal noun.

Chaidh falbh
went leaving
'They/Everybody left.'

== Subjects in sentence structure ==
The subject receives a privileged status in theories of sentence structure. In those approaches that acknowledge the binary division of the clause into a subject and a predicate (as is the case in most phrase structure grammars), the subject is usually a daughter of the root node, whereby its sister is the predicate. The object, in contrast, appears lower in the structure as a dependent of the/a verb, e.g.

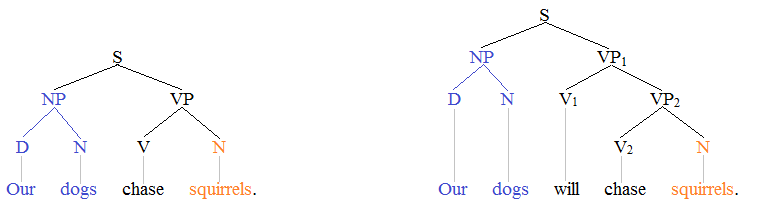
Subjects 1.1

Subjects are indicated using blue, and objects using orange. The special status of the subject is visible insofar as the subject is higher in the tree each time than the object. In theories of syntax that reject the initial division (as is the case in most dependency grammars), the subject is nevertheless also granted a privileged status insofar as it is an immediate dependent of the finite verb. The following trees are those of a dependency grammar:

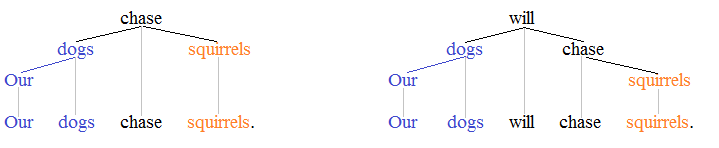
Subjects 2

The subject is a dependent of the root node, the finite verb, in both trees. The object, in contrast, appears lower in the second tree, where it is a dependent of the non-finite verb. The subject remains a dependent finite verb when subject-auxiliary inversion occurs:

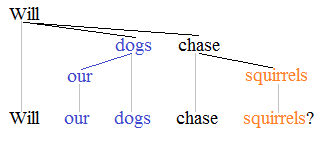
Subjects 3

The prominence of the subject is consistently reflected in its position in the tree as an immediate dependent of the root word, the finite verb.

== See also ==
- Complement (linguistics)
- Copula
- Grammatical case
- Object (grammar)
- Preparatory subject
- Quirky subject
- Sentence (linguistics)
- Subjective (grammar)
- Term logic
- Traditional grammar
