= Auxiliary verb =

Verb adding grammatical meaning rather than content meaning

An auxiliary verb (abbreviated aux) is a verb that adds functional or grammatical meaning to the clause in which it occurs, so as to express tense, aspect, modality, voice, emphasis, etc. Auxiliary verbs usually accompany an infinitive verb or a participle, which respectively provide the main semantic content of the clause. An example is the verb have in the sentence I have finished my lunch. Here, the auxiliary have helps to express the perfect aspect along with the participle, finished. Some sentences contain a chain of two or more auxiliary verbs. Auxiliary verbs are also called helping verbs, helper verbs, or (verbal) auxiliaries. Research has been conducted into split inflection in auxiliary verbs.

== Basic examples ==
Below are some sentences that contain representative auxiliary verbs from English, Spanish, German and French, with the auxiliary verb marked in bold:

a. Do you want tea? – do is an auxiliary accompanying the infinitive, want, used here to form a question – see do-support.

b. She has given her best shot. – have, from which has is inflected, is an auxiliary used in expressing the perfect aspect of give.

c. He cogido tu lápiz. – he is an auxiliary accompanying the infinitive coger, used here to form a verb phrase, the perfect present in Spanish.

(I) have grabbed your pencil = 'I have taken your pencil.'

d. Das wurde mehrmals gesagt. – werden, from which wurde is inflected, become is an auxiliary used to build the passive voice in German.

That became many times said = 'That was said many times.'

e. Sie ist nach Hause gegangen. – sein, from which ist is inflected, 'be' is an auxiliary used with movement verbs to build the perfect tense/aspect in German.

She is to home gone = 'She went home/She has gone home.'

f. J'ai vu le soleil. – avoir, from which ai is inflected, 'have' is an auxiliary used to build the perfect tense/aspect in French.

I have seen the sun = 'I have seen the sun/I saw the sun.'

g. Nous sommes hébergés par un ami. – être, from which sommes is inflected, 'be' is an auxiliary used to build the passive voice in French.

We are hosted by a friend.

These auxiliaries help express a question, show tense/aspect, or form passive voice. Auxiliaries like these typically appear with a full verb that carries the main semantic content of the clause.

== Traits across languages ==
Auxiliary verbs typically help express grammatical tense, aspect, mood, and voice. They generally appear together with an infinitive. The auxiliary is said to "help" the infinitive. The auxiliary verbs of a language form a closed class, i.e., there is a fixed, relatively small number of them.

Widely acknowledged verbs that can serve as auxiliaries in English and many related languages are the equivalents of be to express passive voice, and have (and sometimes be) to express perfect aspect or past time reference.

In some treatments, the copula be is classed as an auxiliary even though it does not "help" another verb, e.g.,

The bird is in the tree. – is serves as a copula with a predicative expression not containing any other verb.

Definitions of auxiliary verbs are not always consistent across languages, or even among authors discussing the same language. Modal verbs may or may not be classified as auxiliaries, depending on the language. In the case of English, verbs are often identified as auxiliaries based on their grammatical behavior, as described below. In some cases, verbs that function similarly to auxiliaries, but are not considered full members of that class (perhaps because they carry some independent lexical information), are called semi-auxiliaries. In French, for example, verbs such as devoir (have to), pouvoir (be able to), aller (be going to), vouloir (want), faire (make), and laisser (let), when used together with the infinitive of another verb, can be called semi-auxiliaries. There has also been a study on auxiliary verb constructions in Dravidian languages.

== English ==
The following sections consider auxiliary verbs in English. They list auxiliary verbs, then present the diagnostics that motivate this special class (subject-auxiliary inversion and negation with not). The modal verbs are included in this class, due to their behavior with respect to these diagnostics.

=== List of auxiliaries in English ===
A list of verbs that (can) function as auxiliaries in English is as follows: be, can, could, dare, do, have, may, might, mote, must, need, ought, shall, should, will, would.

The status of dare (not), need (not), and ought (to) is debatable and the use of these verbs as auxiliaries can vary across dialects of English. If the negative forms can't, don't, won't, etc. are viewed as separate verbs (and not as contractions), then the number of auxiliaries increases. The verbs do and have can also function as full verbs or as light verbs, which can be a source of confusion about their status. The modal verbs (can, could, may, might, mote, must, shall, should, will, would, and dare, need and ought when included) form a subclass of auxiliary verbs. Modal verbs are defective insofar as they cannot be inflected, nor do they appear as gerunds, infinitives, or participles.

The following table summarizes the auxiliary verbs in standard English and the meaning contribution to the clauses in which they appear. Many auxiliary verbs are listed more than once in the table based upon discernible differences in use.

Auxiliary verb	Meaning contribution	Example
be_{1}	copula (= linking verb)	She is the boss.
be_{2}	progressive aspect	He is sleeping.
be_{3}	passive voice	They were seen.
can_{1}	ability	I can swim.
can_{2}	permission (deontic modality)	Can I come in?
can_{3}	suggestion or offer (deontic modality)	I can come with you.
could_{1}	past tense of can_{1}	I could swim (back then).
could_{2}	past tense of can_{2}	I couldn't leave.
could_{3}	can_{1} hypothetical	I couldn't play guitar without hands.
could_{4}	can_{2} hypothetical	I could participate if I was over 18.
could_{5}	can_{3} hypothetical	I could stay here in case he comes back.
could_{6}	can_{1} uncertain	That could help.
could_{7}	can_{2} uncertain or hesitant	Could I come in?
could_{8}	can_{3} uncertain or hesitant	I could say something if you want me to.
dare	deontic modality	I dare not attempt it.
do_{1}	do-support for negation	You did not understand.
do_{2}	emphatic do	I do understand.
do_{3}	question-forming do-support	Do you understand?
have	perfect aspect	They have understood.
may_{1}	permission (deontic modality)	May I stay?
may_{2}	possibility (epistemic modality)	That may happen.
might_{1}	possibility (epistemic modality)	That might happen.
might_{2}	humble request (deontic modality)	Might I ask for your advice?
mote	optative mood	So mote it be.
must_{1}	obligation (deontic modality)	You must not mock me.
must_{2}	logical deduction (epistemic modality)	It must have rained.
need	deontic modality	You need not water the grass.
ought_{1}	exhortation or judgment (deontic modality)	You ought to stay home after dark.
ought_{2}	expectation (epistemic modality)	You ought to play well after a good night's sleep.
shall_{1}	insistence or obligation (deontic modality)	The renter shall be responsible for the damage.
shall_{2}	permission (deontic modality)	You shall enter.
should_{1}	advice (deontic modality)	You should listen.
should_{2}	expectation (epistemic modality)	That should help.
should_{3}	hypothetical (epistemic modality)	If I should fail, please help me.
should have	past tense of shall	The landlord should have paid for it.
will_{1}	future tense	The sun will rise tomorrow at 6:03.
will_{2}	habitual aspect	He will make that mistake every time.
will_{3}	predictive inference (epistemic modality)	He will be home by now.
will_{4}	ability	Only one key will fit.
will_{5}	intention or request (deontic modality)	I will have a Caesar salad.
would_{1}	past tense of will_{1} (future-in-the-past)	After 1990, we would do that again.
would_{2}	past tense of will_{2}	Back then we would always go there.
would_{3}	past tense of will_{3}	He would be home.
would_{4}	past tense of will_{4}	Only one key would fit.
would_{5}	past tense of will_{5}	We would have pie.
would_{6}	hypothetical of will_{1}	I would go tomorrow.
would_{7}	hypothetical of will_{2}	He would make that mistake every time.
would_{8}	hypothetical of will_{3}	He would be home by now.
would_{9}	hypothetical of will_{4}	The shirt would fit if I lost weight.
would have	past tense hypothetical of will	He would have gone home.

Deontic modality expresses an ability, necessity, or obligation that is associated with an agent subject. Epistemic modality expresses the speaker's assessment of reality or likelihood of reality. Distinguishing between the two types of modality can be difficult, since many sentences contain a modal verb that allows both interpretations.

=== List of auxiliaries unique to African American Vernacular English ===
African American Vernacular English makes a variety of finer tense/aspect distinctions than other dialects of English by making use of unique variant forms of, in particular: habitual 'be', reduced 'done' (dən), and stressed 'been' (BIN):

Verbal Auxiliaries in AAVE
Auxiliary	Meaning	Example
be	habitual aspect	She be telling people she eight. 'She is always telling people she's eight'
done	resultative modality	I done pushed it. 'I have (already) pushed it'
been	distant past tense	I been knew that. 'I've known that for a long time'

== Light verbs ==
Some syntacticians distinguish between auxiliary verbs and light verbs. The two are similar insofar as both verb types contribute mainly just functional information to the clauses in which they appear. Hence both do not qualify as separate predicates, but rather they form part of a predicate with another expression – usually with a full verb in the case of auxiliary verbs and usually with a noun in the case of light verbs.

Sometimes the distinction between auxiliary verbs and light verbs is overlooked or confused. Certain verbs (e.g., used to, have to, etc.) may be judged as light verbs by some authors, but as auxiliaries by others.

== See also ==
- Compound verb
- English verbs
- Irregular verb
- Modal verb
- Tense–aspect–mood
