= Grammatical tense =

Expression of time reference in grammar

In grammar, tense is a category that expresses time reference. Tenses are usually manifested by the use of specific forms of verbs, particularly in their conjugation patterns.

The main tenses found in many languages include the past, present, and future. Some languages have only two distinct tenses, such as past and nonpast, or future and nonfuture, while some languages make finer tense distinctions, such as remote vs recent past, or near vs remote future. There are also tenseless languages, like most of the Chinese languages; however, these languages do refer to time in different ways.

Tenses generally express time relative to the moment of speaking. In some contexts, however, their meaning may be relativized to a point in the past or future which is established in the discourse (the moment being spoken about). This is called relative (as opposed to absolute) tense. Some languages have different verb forms or constructions which manifest relative tense, such as pluperfect ("past-in-the-past") and "future-in-the-past".

Expressions of tense are often closely connected with expressions of the category of aspect; sometimes what are traditionally called tenses (in languages such as Latin) may in modern analysis be regarded as combinations of tense with aspect. Verbs are also often conjugated for mood, and since in many cases the three categories are not manifested separately, some languages may be described in terms of a combined tense–aspect–mood (TAM) system.

== Etymology ==
The English noun tense comes from Old French tens "time" (spelled temps in modern French through deliberate archaization), from Latin tempus, "time". It is not related to the adjective tense, which comes from Latin tensus, the perfect passive participle of tendere, "stretch".

== Uses of the term ==
In modern linguistic theory, tense is understood as a category that expresses (grammaticalizes) time reference; namely one which, using grammatical means, places a state or action at a time relative to that of the utterance. Nonetheless, in many descriptions of languages, particularly in traditional European grammar, the term "tense" is applied to verb forms or constructions that express not merely position in time, but also other properties of the state or action – particularly aspectual or modal properties.

The category of aspect expresses how a state or action relates to time – whether it is seen as a complete event, an ongoing or repeated situation, etc. Many languages make a distinction between perfective aspect (denoting complete events) and imperfective aspect (denoting ongoing or repeated situations); the former may employ a perfect tense, but such a relationship between aspect and tense may not be simple. Some of the traditional "tenses" express time reference together with aspectual information. In Latin and French, for example, the imperfect denotes past time in combination with imperfective aspect, while other verb forms (the Latin perfect, and the French passé composé or passé simple) are used for past time reference with perfective aspect.

The category of mood is used to express modality, which includes such properties as uncertainty, evidentiality, and obligation. Commonly encountered moods include the indicative, subjunctive, and conditional. Mood can be bound up with tense, aspect, or both, in particular verb forms. Hence, certain languages are sometimes analysed as having a single tense–aspect–mood (TAM) system, without separate manifestation of the three categories.

The term tense, then, particularly in less formal contexts, is sometimes used to denote any combination of tense proper, aspect, and mood. As regards English, there are many verb forms and constructions which combine time reference with continuous or perfect aspect, and with indicative, subjunctive or conditional mood.

Particular tense forms need not always carry their basic time-referential meaning in every case. For instance, the historical present is a use of the present tense to refer to past events. The phenomenon of fake tense is common crosslinguistically as a means of marking counterfactuality in conditionals and wishes.

== Possible tenses ==
Not all languages have tense: tenseless languages include Dyirbal. Some languages have all three basic tenses (the past, present, and future), while others have only two: some have past and nonpast tenses, the latter covering both present and future times, as in Arabic, Japanese, and English; whereas others such as Greenlandic, Quechua, and Nivkh have future and nonfuture. Some languages have four or more tenses, making finer distinctions either in the past (e.g. remote vs. recent past) or in the future (e.g. near vs. remote future). The six-tense language Kalaw Lagaw Ya of Australia has the remote past, the recent past, the today past, the present, the today/near future and the remote future. Some languages, like the Amazonian Cubeo language, have a historical past tense, used for events perceived as historical.

Tenses that refer specifically to "today" are called hodiernal tenses; these can be either past or future. Apart from Kalaw Lagaw Ya, another language with such tenses is Mwera, a Bantu language of Tanzania. It is also suggested that in 17th-century French, the passé composé served as a hodiernal past. Tenses that refer to the past before today or the future after today are called pre-hodiernal and post-hodiernal respectively. Some languages also have a crastinal tense, a future tense referring specifically to tomorrow (found in some Bantu languages); or a hesternal tense, a past tense referring specifically to yesterday (although this name is also sometimes used to mean pre-hodiernal). A tense for after tomorrow is thus called post-crastinal, and one for before yesterday is called pre-hesternal.

Another tense found in some languages, including Swahili, is the persistive tense, used to indicate that a state or ongoing action still continues (or, if in the negative, does not). The Washo language has tenses to indicate that an event occurred before the speaker's lifetime.

Some languages have special tense forms that are used to express relative tense. Tenses that refer to the past relative to some time other than that of the utterance are called anterior; these include the pluperfect (for the past relative to a past time) and the future perfect (for the past relative to a future time). Similarly, posterior tenses refer to the future relative to the time under consideration, as with the English "future-in-the-past": (he said that) he would go. Relative tenses are also sometimes analysed as aspects: the perfect aspect in the anterior case, or the prospective aspect in the posterior case.

Some languages, such as Nez Perce or Cavineña also have periodic tense markers that encode that the action occurs in a recurrent temporal period of the day ("in the morning", "during the day", "at night", "until dawn" etc.) or of the year ("in winter").

Some languages have cyclic tense systems. This is a form of temporal marking where tense is given relative to a reference point or reference span. In Burarra, for example, events that occurred earlier on the day of speaking are marked with the same verb forms as events that happened in the far past, while events that happened yesterday (compared to the moment of speech) are marked with the same forms as events in the present. This can be thought of as a system where events are marked as prior or contemporaneous to points of reference on a timeline.

== Tense marking ==
=== Morphology of tense ===
Tense is normally indicated by the use of a particular verb form – either an inflected form of the main verb, or a multi-word construction, or both in combination. Inflection may involve the use of affixes, such as the -ed ending that marks the past tense of English regular verbs, but can also entail stem modifications, such as ablaut, as found as in the strong verbs in English and other Germanic languages, or reduplication. Multi-word tense constructions often involve auxiliary verbs or clitics. Examples which combine both types of tense marking include the French passé composé, which has an auxiliary verb together with the inflected past participle form of the lexical verb; and the Irish past tense, where the proclitic do (in various surface forms) appears with the affixed or ablaut-modified past tense form of the lexical verb.

Indications of tense are often bound up with indications of other verbal categories, such as aspect and mood. The conjugation patterns of verbs often also reflect agreement with categories pertaining to the subject, such as person, number and gender via portmanteau morphs. It is thus not always possible to identify elements that mark any specific category, such as tense, separately from the others.

==== Nominal tense ====
A few languages have been shown to mark tense information (as well as aspect and mood) on nouns. This may be called nominal tense, or more broadly nominal TAM which includes nominal marking of aspect and mood as well.

For example, the Kayardild language uses case markers to mark tense:

Ngada kurri-nangku mala-wu (balmbi-wu)
1.SG.NOM see-NEG.POT sea-M.PROP morrow.M.PROP
'I won't be able to see the sea (tomorrow)'

Ngada kurri-nangku mala-y (barruntha-y)
1.SG.NOM see-NEG.POT sea-M.LOC morrow.M.LOC
'I couldn't see the sea (yesterday)'

The verb stays the same, with the modal cases being used to show tense in the sentences.

==== Tenseless language ====
A tenseless language is one that does not mark tense information at all. Examples are Burmese, Dyirbal, most varieties of Chinese, Malay (including Indonesian), Thai, Yucatec Maya, Vietnamese, and in some analyses Greenlandic (Kalaallisut) and Guaraní.

Tenseless languages can and do refer to time, but they do so using lexical items that establish time reference, or by using combinations of aspect and mood. For example, most Sinitic languages express time reference chiefly by lexical means – through adjuncts, time phrases, and so on. (The same is done in tensed languages, to supplement or reinforce the time information conveyed by the choice of tense.) Time information is also sometimes conveyed as a secondary feature by markers of other categories, as with the aspect markers 了 le and 過 guò, which in most cases place an action in past time. However, much time information is conveyed implicitly by context – it is therefore not always necessary, when translating from a tensed to a tenseless language, say, to make explicit in the target language all of the information conveyed by the tenses in the source.

For example, in Mandarin, though the language is tenseless, the auxiliary verb 会 huì can be used to express an action that will occur in the future:

我 想 他 不 会 来 了。
Wǒ xiǎng tā bù huì lái le.
I think he not FUT come PFV
'I don’t think he will come.'

=== Syntax of tense ===
The syntactic properties of tense have been prominent in formal analyses of how tense-marking interacts with word order. Some languages (such as French) allow an adverb (Adv) between a tense-marked verb (V) and its direct object (O); in other words, they permit [Verb-Adverb-Object] order. In contrast, other languages (such as English) do not allow an adverb to come between a tense-marked lexical verb and its direct object, and instead require [Adverb-Verb-Object] order. (For tense-marked auxiliary verbs in English, either position of the adverb is possible. (Note: "Central position [of an adverb phrase (which may simply consist of one adverb)] in clauses headed by a lexical verb is between the subject and the verb; for clauses headed by an auxiliary verb it can again be between subject and verb, but is more often just after the verb (and hence not always clearly distinct from end position)."))

Adverb placement, French versus English (Note: This article follows the linguistics convention of marking an ungrammatical construction with an asterisk.)
	French	English
Tense-marked verb, then adverb	Jules apprend vite ses rôles. ('Jules learns his lines quickly.')	*Jules learns quickly his lines.
Tense-marked verb, then adverb	Jules a vite appris son rôle. ('Jules learnt his lines quickly.')	Jules has quickly learnt his lines.
Adverb, then tense-marked verb	*Jules vite apprend ses rôles.	Jules quickly learns his lines.
Adverb, then tense-marked verb	*Jules vite a appris son rôle.	*Jules quickly has learnt his lines. (Note: For a verb phrase–oriented adjunct such as quickly, "Central position (after the tensed auxiliary if there is one) is an alternative [to end position]".)

Tense in syntax is represented by the category label T, which is the head of a TP (tense phrase).

== In particular languages ==
The study of modern languages has been greatly influenced by the grammar of the Classical languages, since early grammarians, often monks, had no other reference point to describe their language. Latin terminology is often used to describe modern languages, sometimes with a change of meaning, as with the application of "perfect" to forms in English that do not necessarily have perfective meaning, or the terms Imperfekt and Perfekt to German past tense forms that mostly lack any relationship to the aspects suggested by those terms.

=== Indo-European languages ===
Proto-Indo-European verbs had present, aorist and perfect forms – these can be considered as representing two tenses (present and past) with different aspects. Most Indo-European languages have developed systems either with two morphological tenses (present or "non-past", and past) or with three (present, past and future). The tenses often form part of entangled tense–aspect–mood conjugation systems. Additional tenses, tense–aspect combinations, etc., such as the future tense, can be provided by compound constructions using auxiliary verbs.

==== Latin ====
Latin is traditionally described as having six tenses (the Latin for "tense" being tempus, plural tempora):

- Present (praesēns)
- Future simple (futūrum)
- Past imperfect (praeteritum imperfectum)
- Perfect (perfectum), sometimes also called aorist
- Future perfect (futūrum perfectum)
- Pluperfect (plūs quam perfectum, praeteritum perfectum)

A newer grammar of Latin also lists these six (Note: Although it names them respectively: present or present imperfective, future or future imperfective, imperfect or past imperfective, perfect, future perfect or future perfective, pluperfect or past perfective.) but comments that "The distinction between imperfective and perfective 'tenses' is really a distinction of aspect, which is at the basis of the whole conjugation system"; and states that Latin thus has just three tenses: present, past, and future.

Imperfect tense verbs represent a past process combined with imperfective aspect, that is, they often stand for an ongoing past action or state at a past point in time (see secondary present) or represent habitual actions (see Latin tenses with modality) (e.g. 'he was eating', 'he used to eat'). The perfect tense combines the meanings of a simple past ('he ate') with that of an English perfect tense ('he has eaten'), which in ancient Greek are two different tenses (aorist and perfect).

The pluperfect, the perfect and the future perfect may also realise relative tenses, standing for events that are past at the time of another event (see secondary past): for instance, mortuus erat, mortuus est, mortuus erit may mean respectively 'he had died', 'he has died' and 'he will have died'.

Latin verbs are inflected for tense and aspect together with mood – indicative, subjunctive, and imperative (all finite); and infinitive and participle (both non-finite (Note: There are also gerund, gerundive, and supine, but these three are irrelevant to tense.)) – and voice (active or passive). Most forms inflected for tense consist of a verb stem and a suffix whose inflection expresses not only tense but (as a "portmanteau morph") also other categories (such as person and number). Some tenses are expressed by sequences of inflected verbs.

===== Romance languages =====
The Romance languages (descendants of Latin) have past, present and future morphological tenses, with additional aspectual distinction in the past. French is an example of a language where, as in German, the simple morphological perfective past (passé simple) has mostly given way to a compound form (passé composé), the former mostly reserved for use in formal contexts.

==== Ancient Greek ====
The paradigms for tenses in Ancient Greek are similar to those in Latin, but with a three-way aspectual contrast in the past: the aorist, perfect and imperfect. Both aorist and imperfect verbs can represent a past event: through contrast, the imperfect verb often implies a longer duration (e.g. 'they urged him' vs. 'they persuaded him'). The aorist participle represents the first event of a two-event sequence, and the present participle an ongoing event at the time of another event. Perfect verbs stand for past actions if the result is still present (e.g. 'I have found it') or for present states resulting from a past event (e.g. 'I remember').

==== Germanic languages ====
The Germanic languages (which include English) have present (non-past) and past tenses formed morphologically, with future and other additional forms made using auxiliaries. In standard German, the compound past (Perfekt) is preferred over the morphological past in spoken language.

===== English =====
English has only two morphological tenses: the present (or non-past), as in he goes, and the past (or preterite), as in he went. The non-past usually references the present, but sometimes the future (as in the bus leaves tomorrow). In special uses such as the historical present it can refer to the past as well. These morphological tenses are marked either with a suffix (walk(s) ~ walked) or with ablaut (sing(s) ~ sang).

In some contexts, particularly in English language teaching, various tense–aspect combinations are referred to loosely as tenses. Similarly, the term "future tense" is sometimes loosely applied to cases where modals such as will are used to talk about future points in time.

==== Slavic languages ====
In the Slavic languages, verbs are intrinsically perfective or imperfective. In Russian and other East Slavic languages, perfective verbs have past and "future" tenses, while imperfective verbs have past, present and "future", the imperfective "future" being a compound tense in most cases. The "future tense" of perfective verbs is formed in the same way as the present tense of imperfective verbs. However, in South Slavic languages, there may be a greater variety of forms – Bulgarian, for example, has present, past (both "imperfect" and "aorist") and "future tenses", for both perfective and imperfective verbs, as well as perfect forms made with an auxiliary (see Bulgarian verbs). However it doesn't have a real future tense, because the future tense is formed by the shortened version of the present of the verb hteti (ще) and it just adds present tense forms of person suffixes: -m (I), -š (you), -ø (he, she, it), -me (we), -te (you, plural), -t (they).

==== Celtic languages ====
Old Irish, an early Celtic language, had past, present and future tenses. The past tense contrasts the perfective and imperfective aspects. Classical Irish, which underwent several changes to its verb morphology, had a three-way aspectual contrast of simple–perfective–imperfective in the past and present tenses.

Modern Scottish Gaelic on the other hand only has past, non-past and 'indefinite', and, in the case of the verb 'be' (including its use as an auxiliary), also present tense.

==== Persian ====
Persian, an Indo-Iranian language, has past and non-past forms, with additional aspectual distinctions. Future can be expressed using the auxiliary خواستن xâstan, but almost never in non-formal contexts, for which the present tense is used instead. For example:

fardâ bârân mi-âyad
tomorrow rain IPFV-come-3SG-PRES
'It will rain tomorrow'

The adverb "tomorrow" is used to signal future time, with the verb being in the present (non-past) tense.

==== Hindustani ====
Hindustani (Hindi and Urdu), an Indo-Aryan language, has indicative perfect past and indicative future forms, while the indicative present and indicative imperfect past conjugations exist only for the verb honā (to be). The indicative future is constructed using the future subjunctive conjugations (which used to be the indicative present conjugations in older forms of Hindi–Urdu) by adding a future suffix -gā that declines for gender and the number of the noun that the pronoun refers to. The forms of gā are derived from the perfective participle forms of the verb jāna ('to go'). The conjugations of the indicative perfect past and the indicative imperfect past are derived from participles (just like the past tense formation in Slavic languages) and hence they agree with the number and the gender of the noun which the pronoun refers to and not the pronoun itself. The perfect past doubles as the perfective aspect participle and the imperfect past conjugations act as the copula to mark imperfect past when used with the aspectual participles. Hindi–Urdu has an overtly marked tense–aspect–mood system. Periphrastic Hindi–Urdu verb forms (aspectual verb forms) consist of two elements, the first of these two elements is the aspect marker and the second element (the copula) is the common tense-mood marker. Hindi–Urdu has three aspectsː Habitual, Perfective, and Progressive; and five moodsː Indicative, Presumptive, Subjunctive, Contrafactual, and Imperative.

=== Austronesian languages ===
==== Rapa ====
Rapa is a French Polynesian language of the island of Rapa Iti. Verbs in the indigenous Old Rapa (Note: "Very little of Old Rapa is still spoken, the modern language ('Reo Rapa') has become heavily Tahitianized, and a 'new' Rapa ('New Rapa') is emerging from revitalization efforts. . . .") occur with a TAM (tense, aspect, or mood) marker which can be followed by directional or deictic particles. "The primary tense–aspect markers used in Old Rapa are the imperfective, progressive, perfective, past, imperative, and subjunctive." However, specific tense–aspect–modality (TAM) markers and the type of deictic or directional particle that follows express different types of meaning.

"TAM particle i marks past action. It is rarely used as a matrix TAM and is more frequently observed in past embedded clauses."

i komo mātou
PST sleep 1PL.EXCL
'We slept.'

e a'a koe i 'aka-ineine
IPFV what 2S PST CAUS-ready
'What did you prepare?'

==== Wuvulu-Aua ====
Wuvulu-Aua does not have explicit tense, but rather time reference is conveyed by mood, aspect markers, and time phrases. Wuvulu speakers use a realis mood to describe the past as they can be certain about events that have occurred. In some cases, realis mood is used for the present — often for stative clauses. An irrealis mood is used for the future.

Tense in Wuvulu-Aua may also be implied by using time adverbials and aspectual markings. Wuvulu contains three verbal markers to indicate sequence of events. The preverbal adverbial loʔo ('first') indicates the verb occurs before any other. The postverbal morpheme liai and linia are the respective intransitive and transitive suffixes indicating a repeated action. The postverbal morpheme li and liria are respectively intransitive and transitive suffixes indicating a completed action.

==== Mortlockese ====
Mortlockese uses tense markers such as mii to denote the present state of a subject, aa to denote a present state that an object has changed to, kɞ to describe something that has already been completed, pɞ and lɛ to describe the future, pʷapʷ to denote a possible action or state in the future, and sæn/mwo for something that has not yet happened. Each of these markers, except for aa and mii, is used in conjunction with the subject proclitics. Additionally, mii can be used with any type of intransitive verb.

=== Other languages ===
Finnish and Hungarian, both members of the Uralic language family, have morphological present (non-past) and past tenses. The Hungarian verb van ("to be") also has a future form.

Turkish verbs conjugate for past, present and future, with a variety of aspects and moods.

Arabic verbs have past and non-past; future can be indicated by a prefix.

Korean verbs have a variety of affixed forms which can be described as representing present, past and future tenses, although they can alternatively be considered to be aspectual. Similarly, Japanese verbs are described as having present and past tenses, although the distinction may be analysed as one of aspect. Some Wu Chinese languages, such as Shanghainese, use particles to mark some tenses. Other Chinese languages and many other East Asian languages generally lack inflection and are considered to be tenseless, although they often have aspect markers which convey information about time reference.

== See also ==
- Sequence of tenses
