= French verbs =

Parts of speech in French grammar

In French grammar, verbs are a part of speech. Each verb lexeme has a collection of finite and non-finite forms in its conjugation scheme.

Finite forms depend on grammatical tense and person/number. There are eight simple tense–aspect–mood forms, categorized into the indicative, subjunctive and imperative moods, with the conditional mood sometimes viewed as an additional category. The eight simple forms can also be categorized into four tenses (future, present, past, and future-of-the-past), or into two aspects (perfective and imperfective).

The three non-finite moods are the infinitive, past participle, and present participle.

There are compound constructions that use more than one verb. These include one for each simple tense with the addition of avoir or être as an auxiliary verb. There is also a construction which is used to distinguish passive voice from active voice.

== Conjugation ==
French verbs are conjugated by isolating the stem of the verb and adding an ending. In the first and second conjugation, the stem is easily identifiable from the infinitive, and remains essentially constant throughout the paradigm. For example, the stem of parler ("speak") is parl- and the stem of finir ("finish") is fin-. In the third group, the relationship between the infinitive form and the stem is less consistent, and several distinct stems are needed to produce all the forms in the paradigm. For example, the verb boire ("drink") has the stems boi-, boiv-, bu-, and buv-.

The ending depends on the mood, tense, aspect, and voice of the verb, as well as on the person and number of its subject. Every conjugation exhibits some degree of syncretism, where the same (homophonous, and possibly also homographic) form is used to realize distinct combinations of grammatical features. This is most noticeable for -er verbs. For instance, the conjugated form parle can be the 1st or 3rd person singular indicative or subjunctive form of parler, or the singular familiar imperative. Furthermore, the 2nd person singular indicative and subjunctive form parles and the 3rd person plural form parlent are pronounced the same way as parle (except in liaison contexts). The prevalence of syncretism in conjugation paradigms is one functional explanation for the fact that French does not allow null subjects, unlike most of the other Romance languages.

=== Classification ===
Aside from être and avoir (considered categories unto themselves), French verbs are traditionally grouped into three conjugation classes (groupes):

- The first conjugation class consists of all verbs with infinitives ending in -er, except for the irregular verb aller and (by some accounts) the irregular verbs envoyer and renvoyer; the verbs in this conjugation, which together constitute the great majority of French verbs, are all conjugated similarly, though there are a number of subclasses with minor changes arising from orthographical and phonological considerations.
- The second conjugation class consists of all verbs with infinitives in -ir or -ïr and present participles in -issant or -ïssant, as well as the verb maudire. There are somewhat over 300 such verbs, all conjugated identically, with some minor exceptions. The -iss- or -ïss- in much of their conjugation is a reflex of the Latin inchoative infix -isc-/-esc-, but does not retain any aspectual semantics.
- The third conjugation class consists of all other verbs: aller, arguably (r)envoyer, a number of verbs in -ir (including all verbs in -oir, which is an etymologically unrelated ending), and all verbs in -re. Nonetheless, this class is very small compared to the other two, though it does contain some of the most common verbs. This class has a few dozen subclasses, often differing substantially; indeed, this class is essentially a catch-all for verbs, besides être and avoir, that do not fit into the first two classes. There are about 370 verbs in this group, though a much smaller number are still in frequent use.

== Moods ==
As with English verbs, French verbs have both non-finite moods (les modes impersonnels), also called verbals, and finite ones (les modes personnels).

=== Finite moods ===
The finite moods are the indicative (l'indicatif), the imperative (l'impératif), and the subjunctive (le subjonctif). As discussed below, sometimes the conditional is recognized as a fourth mood. While the rules that determine the correct mood are quite complex, they are simplified and summarized in the following table:

indicative	used in most independent clauses; used in affirmative and negative statements and questions; used in dependent clauses that are certainly true; used when no other mood applies	« Où êtes-vous ? » ("Where are you?"); « Je suis ici. » ("I am here.")
subjunctive	used in many dependent clauses; used to express a doubtful, desired, or requested event; used to express an event to which the reaction is of most significance; used to express a third-person imperative; used much more than in English	« Il se peut qu'il vienne demain. » ("It may be that he will come tomorrow."); « J'ai demandé qu'il parte. » ("I asked that he leave."); « Je suis heureux qu'il soit venu. » ("I am glad that he came."); « Vive la République ! » ("Long live the Republic!")
imperative	used in commands and requests; only possible with first-person plural and second-person singular and plural subject; the subject is implied; almost exactly as in English	« Fais tes devoirs ! » ("Do your homework!"); « Faisons nos devoirs ensemble. » ("Let's do our homework together.")

Many linguists recognize a fourth mood, the conditional (le conditionnel), which is used in almost exactly the same circumstances as the conditional in English. In French, « Je le ferais si j'avais assez de temps » is "I would do it if I had enough time" in English. The conditional can also be used evidentially, to express reservations about the verb: « Il serait suivi par un psychologue », "He is apparently/is said to be/[etc.] under the care of a psychologist." Other linguists consider the conditional to be a tense of the indicative mood. The two camps do not disagree on the rules for when and how to use the conditional. A third camp recognizes both "conditionnel présent/conditionnel passé" (for use in conditional sentences), and "indicatif futur du passé / indicatif futur antérieur du passé" (for tense concords, "future from a past point of view"; e.g. « Il m'a dit qu'il le ferait le lendemain », "He told me he would do it the next day"), but they recognize also that both are conjugated the same.

=== Non-finite moods ===
- The infinitive has a present tense, with a perfect: "faire" means "to do", while "avoir fait" means "to have done".
- There is a present participle, with a perfect construction: "faisant" means "doing", while "ayant fait" means "having done". As noted above, this participle is not used in forming a continuous aspect. Further, it cannot be used as a noun, in the way that present participles in English have the same form as gerunds; the only verbal noun is the infinitive.
  - There is a gérondif ("gerundive", but different from the Latin gerundive), formed with the clitic en and the present participle: "en faisant" means "by doing" or "while doing". (It is analogous to the English "in doing", but in English, since "doing" can act as a noun, "in doing" is taken as a prepositional phrase rather than as a separate verb form. That interpretation is not available for "en faisant".) Similarly, "en ayant fait" means "by having done".
- There is a separate past participle: "fait" means "done". As in English, it can be used in the passive voice, in the perfect form, or on its own as an adjective. The past participle has no perfect, except arguably in the special surcomposé tense.

== Tenses and aspects ==
=== Tenses and aspects of the indicative mood ===
The indicative mood has five "simple" (synthetic) tense-aspect forms, conveying four tenses (times of action) (future, present, past, and future-of-past) and two aspects (fabrics of time) (perfective, conveying an action viewed in its entirety without its time frame being considered in more detail, and imperfective, conveying an action that occurs repeatedly or continuously). The tense-aspect forms of the indicative mood in French are called the present (le présent: present tense, imperfective aspect), the simple past (le passé simple: past tense, perfective aspect), the imperfect (l'imparfait: past tense, imperfective aspect), the future (le futur: future tense, unspecified aspect), and the conditional (le conditionnel: future-in-past tense, unspecified aspect). Note that, as discussed above, in some uses the conditional can be considered a separate mood completely, while in other uses it is the future-in-past tense of the indicative. The use of the various tense forms is described in the following table:

present	like in English, used to describe habitual, recurring, and "always" true events; unlike in English, used to describe ongoing current action; unlike in English, used to describe events that started in the past and affect the present (i.e., most cases where simple perfect is used in English); sometimes used to describe upcoming events; used in a protasis (if-clause) when the apodosis (then-clause) is in the future tense or imperative mood	« Les mardis, je joue au tennis. » ("On Tuesdays, I play tennis."); « En ce moment, je joue au tennis. » ("At the moment, I am playing tennis. "); « Il habite à Paris depuis 15 ans. » ("He has lived/has been living in Paris for 15 years. "); « Demain, je joue au tennis avec Marc. » ("Tomorrow, I am playing tennis with Marc."); « Si je joue au tennis avec vous mardi, jouerez-vous aux échecs avec moi mercredi ? » ("If I play tennis with you on Tuesday, will you play chess with me on Wednesday?")
simple past (past perfective)	used to describe past events in a perfective or aorist aspect; that is, with a sense of completion, with a definite beginning and end; a literary tense that is rarely used in spoken language	« Et la lumière fut. » ("And there was light."); « Il naquit en 1930 et mourut en 1998. » ("He was born in 1930 and died in 1998."); « Hier, il plut. » ("Yesterday, it rained."); « Il rangea la salle tandis qu'elle faisait la vaisselle. » ("He cleaned the room while she was washing the dishes.")
imperfect (past imperfective)	used to describe past events or situations in an imperfective aspect; that is, ongoing, repetitive, or habitual past events or situations; often used in conjunction with the simple or compound past to indicate an event that was ongoing while another took place; used in a contrary-to-fact protasis (with the apodosis in the conditional); often analogous to English past continuous ("was doing") or to the construction "used to do"	« Quand j'étais jeune, j'habitais à Paris. » ("When I was young, I lived in Paris."); « Il rangea la salle tandis qu'elle faisait la vaisselle. » ("He cleaned the room while she was washing the dishes."); « Si je le savais, je te le dirais. » ("If I knew [it], I would tell you.")
simple future	used to describe future events; mostly the same as in English, except that it is a simple (one-word) tense in French	« Je le ferai demain. » ("I will do it tomorrow.")
conditional (future-in-past)	used in an apodosis when the protasis is contrary to fact (in the imperfect); used to describe a past event from the standpoint of an even-earlier event; mostly the same as in English, except that it is a simple (one-word) tense in French	« Si je le savais, je te le dirais. » ("If I knew it, I would tell you."); « Ils disaient que je réussirais. » ("They said that I would succeed.")

Additionally, the indicative has five compound (two-word) tense-aspect forms, each of which is formed analogously to the perfect in languages such as English (e.g., "have done") (though in French this form does not indicate the perfect aspect) as applied to one of the above simple tense forms. These tense forms are used to indicate events before the corresponding simple tense forms; for example, « À ce moment-là, il se souvint de ce qu'il avait promis » ("At that moment, he remembered what he had promised"). In addition, except in literature or very formal speeches, the present perfect form is used in modern French wherever the simple past would have been used in older or more literary writing. Since this use is much more common than its use as a true present perfect, it is usually called the compound past (le passé composé). Further, where older or more literary French would have used the perfect form of the simple past tense (le passé antérieur) for the past-of-the-past, modern non-literary French uses the pluperfect (le plus-que-parfait; the perfect of the imperfect), or sometimes a new form called the surcomposé (literally, "over-compound"), which re-applies the perfect to the compound past, resulting in a structure like « Je l'ai eu fait » (literally, "I it have had done").

Unlike English or Spanish, French does not mark for a continuous aspect. Thus, "I am doing it" (continuous) and "I do it" both translate to the same sentence in French: « Je le fais. » However, the distinction is often clear from context; and when not, it can be conveyed using periphrasis; for example, the expression être en train de [faire quelque chose] ("to be in the middle of [doing something]") is often used to convey the sense of a continuous aspect. (For example, "I am doing it" might be expressed as « Je suis en train de le faire », "I am in the middle of doing it.") In the case of the past tense, neither the simple nor the compound past tense is ever used with a continuous sense; therefore, the imperfect often indicates a continuous sense (though it does have other uses, as discussed above).

Similarly to English, the verb aller (to go) can be used as an auxiliary verb to create a near-future tense (le futur proche). Whereas English uses the continuous aspect (to be going), French uses the simple present tense; for example, the English sentence "I am going to do it tomorrow" would in French be « Je vais le faire demain ». As in English, this form can generally be replaced by the present or future tense: "I am doing it tomorrow", "I shall do it tomorrow", « Je le fais demain », « Je le ferai demain ».

Much like the use of aller (to go) to create a near-future tense, the verb venir (to come) can be used as an auxiliary verb to create a near-past tense (le passé proche). As in the near-future tense, the auxiliary verb is in the present tense. Unlike aller, venir needs the preposition de before the infinitive. Hence the English sentence "I [just] did it a minute ago" would in French be « Je viens de le faire il y a une minute ».

=== Tenses and aspects of the subjunctive mood ===
==== Forms ====
The subjunctive mood has only two simple tense-aspect forms: a present (le présent du subjonctif) and an imperfect (l'imparfait du subjonctif). Of these, only the present is used nowadays; like the simple past indicative, the imperfect subjunctive is only found in older and more literary works. When both tense-aspect forms are used, there is no difference in meaning between the two; the present is used in subordinate clauses whose main clauses are in a present or future tense, as well as in the few main clauses that use the subjunctive, and the imperfect is used in subordinate clauses whose main clauses are in a past tense form (other than present perfect). Except in literature and very formal speeches, modern French uses the present subjunctive even where an older or more literary work would use the imperfect subjunctive.

As with the indicative, the subjunctive also has one compound tense form for each simple tense form. The difference between the present perfect subjunctive (le passé du subjonctif) and the pluperfect subjunctive (le plus-que-parfait du subjonctif) is analogous to the difference between the present subjunctive and imperfect subjunctive; of the two, only the present perfect subjunctive is found in modern French.

==== Uses ====
The subjunctive in French is used almost wherever it would be in English, and in many other situations as well. It is used in que ("that") clauses to indicate emotion, doubt, possibility, necessity, desire, and so forth. For example, as in English one says

- Je préfère qu'il le fasse, "I prefer that he it do", "I prefer that he do it"

But also, unlike in English, the subjunctive is used in, for example,

- Je veux qu'il le fasse "I want that he it do", "I want him to do it"
- Je crains qu'il (ne) parte "I fear that he (optional subjunctive particle) leave", "I am afraid that he will leave"
- Je cherche un homme qui sache la vérité "I seek a man who knows the truth", "I am looking for a man who knows the truth"

Sometimes the subjunctive is used in the interrogative and the negative but not in the affirmative:

- Penses-tu qu'il soit sympa ? (subjunctive) "Do you think that he is nice?"
- Oui, je pense qu'il est sympa. (indicative) "Yes, I think that he is nice."
- Non, je ne pense pas qu'il soit sympa. (subjunctive) "No, I do not think that he is nice."

In addition to situations of doubt, negatives stated with certainty take the subjunctive:

- Il n'y a rien que nous puissions faire. "There is nothing that we can do."

Superlatives also can optionally be accompanied by the subjunctive in a que clause, if the speaker feels doubt:

- C'est le meilleur livre que j'aie pu trouver. "That is the best book that I could find."

Finally, as in English, counterfactual conditions in the past are expressed by backshifting the apparent time reference. In English this backshifted form is called the pluperfect subjunctive, and unless it is expressed in inverted form it is identical in form to the pluperfect indicative; it is called subjunctive because of the change in implied time of action. In French, however, there is a distinction in form between the seldom used pluperfect subjunctive and the pluperfect indicative, which is used in this situation. For example,

- Si on l'avait su (pluperfect indicative), on aurait pu (conditional perfect) l'empêcher. "Had we known (pluperfect subjunctive) it, we would have been able (conditional perfect) to prevent it.

=== Tenses and aspects of the imperative mood ===
imperative	used to give commands	« Fais-le. » ("Do it.")

The imperative only has a present tense, with a rarely used perfect: "fais-le" and "aie-le fait" both mean "do it", with the latter implying a certain deadline (somewhat like English "have it done").

== Voice ==
Like English, French has two voices, the unmarked active voice and the marked passive voice. As in English, the passive voice is formed by using the appropriate form of "to be" (être) and the past participle of the main verb.

== Temporal auxiliary verbs ==
In French, all compound tense-aspect forms are formed with an auxiliary verb (either être "to be" or avoir "to have"). Most verbs use avoir as their auxiliary verb. The exceptions are all reflexive verbs and a few exceptions, which all use être. Non-reflexive verbs which use être include:

- aller — to go
- arriver — to arrive
- décéder — to pass away
- descendre — to descend
- devenir — to become
- entrer — to enter
- monter — to climb/mount
- mourir — to die
- naître — to be born
- partir — to leave or part
- passer — to pass by
- rester — to stay
- retourner — to return
- rentrer — to return, to come back
- sortir — to go out
- tomber — to fall
- venir — to come

For example, il est parti "he (has) left," elle est tombée "she fell/has fallen," je suis né en 1980 "I was born in 1980." The same form of these verbs could in some cases be translated into English as either a verb or a predicative adjective, depending on the context: for example, il est mort could mean either "he (has) died" (e.g. il est mort en 1810, "he died in 1810") or "he is dead" (ma mère habite avec moi; mon père est mort "my mother lives with me; my father is dead").

Of the above verbs, descendre, monter, passer, rentrer, and sortir use avoir as their auxiliary verb when used with a direct object : il a descendu la farine de la tablette "he got the flour down from the shelf."

These verbs are often remembered by the acronym MRS VANDER TRAMP or DR & MRS VANDER TRAMP. In the former acronym, devenir and revenir aren't mentioned because they can be thought of as variations of venir.

Verbs that are derived from these by prefixation may continue to select être, but this is not always the case. For example:

- (with être)
  - derived from venir: advenir, intervenir, parvenir, provenir, survenir
  - prefix re-: redevenir, remonter, renaître, rentrer, ressortir, revenir, etc.
- (with avoir)
  - derived from venir: circonvenir, contrevenir, convenir, prévenir, subvenir
  - transitive verbs: démonter, surmonter, dépasser, outrepasser, surpasser, etc.

A small number of verbs, including some already mentioned above, can in fact be found with either auxiliary (croître, monter, descendre, convenir, paraître, apparaître, trépasser). There may be a subtle change of meaning depending on the auxiliary chosen (for example, il a paru "it/he appeared," il est paru "it was published"), and/or one auxiliary may be more literary or archaic than the other.

The distinction between the two auxiliary verbs is important for the correct formation of the compound tense-aspect forms and is essential to the agreement of the past participle.

== Past participle agreement ==
The past participle is used in three ways in French: as an adjective, in the passive construction, and in the compound tense-aspect constructions. When it is used as an adjective, it follows all the regular adjective agreement rules. In passive constructions, it always agrees with the passive subject.

In compound tense-aspect forms, more complicated agreement rules apply, reflecting the subtle priority rules between the attribute meaning (which implies an agreement) and the compound tense construction (which by itself does not imply any agreement).

A. The auxiliary verb is avoir.

1. If there is no direct object (the verb is intransitive) or the direct object appears after the past participle, then the past participle does not agree (i.e., it takes the default masculine singular form).
  - (intransitive) Elles ont dormi. ("They (fem.) slept.")
  - (direct object after verb) Claire a vu deux baleines. ("Claire saw two whales.")
2. If there is a direct object and it appears before the past participle, then the participle must agree with it. Three cases:
  - (pronoun before the auxiliary) Il y avait deux baleines. Claire les a vues. ("There were two whales. Claire saw them.")
  - (clause-initial wh-question element) Quelles baleines Claire a-t-elle vues ? ("Which whales did Claire see?")
  - (relative clause introduced by que) les deux baleines que Claire a vues ("the two whales that Claire saw")
3. The above rule is one of the most difficult in French, and even native speakers have trouble with it, and ignore it in colloquial speech. Since, when spoken, for most verbs, the different forms sound the same (for example, vu vus vue vues "seen" are all pronounced /vy/) this is usually not noticeable. There are however, past participles like fait "done" and mis "put" whose feminine forms sound different when spoken, and only the most careful speakers will be heard applying the rule.

B. The auxiliary is être, and the verb is not reflexive. The past participle agrees with the subject:

Elles sont arrivées. ("They (fem.) arrived.")

C. The auxiliary is être and the verb is reflexive. The agreement rules are in fact the same as those for structures with avoir in A, keeping in mind that the reflexive pronoun corresponds to either the direct object or the indirect object of the verb.

1. There is no direct object, or the direct object appears after the past participle → no agreement. In these cases, the reflexive pronoun expresses the indirect object.
  - (no direct object) Elles se sont succédé. Nous nous sommes parlé. ("They (fem.) succeeded. We spoke with each other.")
  - (direct object after verb) Elles se sont posé des questions. ("They (fem.) asked each other some questions.")
2. There is a direct object and it appears before the past participle. → The past participle agrees with this object. The first three cases are the same as in A.2 above (the reflexive pronoun is the indirect object).
  - (direct object pronoun) J'ai fait une tarte. Les enfants se la sont partagée. ("I made a pie. The children shared it.")
  - (wh-question) Quelle tarte se sont-ils partagée ? ("Which pie did they share?")
  - (que relative) la tarte que les enfants se sont partagée ("the pie that the children shared")
  The reflexive pronoun can itself be the direct object, in which case the participle agrees with it (and therefore with the subject). This also includes "inherently reflexive" verbs, for which the reflexive pronoun cannot be interpreted semantically as an object (direct or indirect) of the verb.
  - (ordinary reflexive) Elles se sont suivies. Nous nous sommes salués. ("They (fem.) followed each other. We greeted each other.")
  - (inherently reflexive) Ils se sont moqués de moi. Nous nous sommes souvenus de l'événement.
    ("They made fun of me. We remembered the event.") (exception: Elles se sont ri du danger. "They (fem.) laughed at the danger.")

== See also ==
- Romance verbs – shows the development of French verbs from Latin
- English verbs
