= French conjugation =

Overview of conjugation in French

Conjugation is the variation in the endings of verbs (inflections) depending on the person (I, you, we, etc), tense (present, future, etc.) and mood (indicative, imperative, subjunctive, etc.). Most French verbs are regular and their inflections can be entirely determined by their infinitive form.

French verbs are conventionally divided into three groups. The first two are the -er and -ir conjugations (conjugaisons). Verbs of the first two groups follow the same patterns, largely without exception. The third group displays more variation in form.

The third group is a closed class, meaning that no new verbs of this group are created. Most new verbs are of the first group (téléviser, atomiser, radiographier), with some in the second group (alunir).

In summary the groups are:

- 1st conjugation: verbs ending in -er (except aller). There are about 6000 verbs in this group.
- 2nd conjugation: verbs ending in -ir, with the present participle ending in -issant. There are about 300 verbs in this group.
- 3rd group: All other verbs: verbs with infinitives in -re, -oir, -ir with the present participle ending in -ant, the verb aller.

== Verb forms ==
The verb forms of French are the finite forms, which are combinations of grammatical moods in various tenses, and the non-finite forms. The moods are: indicative (indicatif), subjunctive (subjonctif), conditional (conditionnel) and imperative (impératif). Tense formation can be either simple (a single, conjugated form), or compound (an auxiliary verb plus a participle, which is not conjugated; see below for details). The finite forms are:

- Indicative
  - Present (présent) which is simple
  - Present perfect (passé composé): literally "compound past", formed with an auxiliary verb in the present
  - Imperfect (imparfait), simple
  - Pluperfect (plus-que-parfait): literally "more than perfect", formed with an auxiliary verb in the imperfect
  - Simple past (passé simple) Conventionally used only in written language (especially in literature) or in extremely formal speech.
  - Past perfect (passé antérieur): formed with an auxiliary verb in the past simple. It is somewhat rare.
  - Simple future (futur simple)
  - Future perfect (futur antérieur): formed with an auxiliary verb in the future simple
- Subjunctive
  - Present, simple
  - Past (passé): formed with an auxiliary verb in the subjunctive present
  - Imperfect, simple. Somewhat rare.
  - Pluperfect: formed with an auxiliary verb in the subjunctive imperfect. Somewhat rare.
- Imperative
  - Present, simple
  - Past: formed with an auxiliary verb in the present imperative. Very rarely used in contemporary French.
- Conditional
  - Present
  - Past (form 1): formed with an auxiliary verb in the present conditional
  - Past (form 2): formed with an auxiliary verb in the imperfect subjunctive. Rarely used.

The non-finite forms are:

- Past participle
- Present participle
- Gerundive: (constructed by preceding the present participle with the preposition en)

Both participles may be used as adjectives in which case they are inflected as adjectives. Used as an adjective the present participle is known as the verbal adjective. There are some cases where a form similar but not identical to the present participle is used for the verbal adjective.

== Auxiliary verbs ==
There are two auxiliary verbs in French: avoir (to have) and être (to be), used to conjugate compound tenses according to these rules:

- Transitive verbs (direct or indirect) in the active voice are conjugated with the verb avoir.
- Intransitive verbs are conjugated with either avoir or être (see French verbs#Temporal auxiliary verbs).
- Reflexive verbs (or "pronominal verbs") are conjugated with être.
- être is used to form the passive voice. In the passive, it is sometimes necessary to combine conjugated forms of être with avoir as an additional auxiliary verb, e.g. Il a été mangé (It was eaten).

Compound tenses are conjugated with an auxiliary followed by the past participle, ex: j'ai fait (I did), je suis tombé (I fell). When être is used, the participle is inflected according to the gender and number of the subject. The participle is inflected with the use of the verb avoir according to the direct object, but only if the direct object precedes the participle, ex:

- il a marché, elle a marché, nous avons marché (he walked, she walked, we walked)
- il est tombé, elle est tombée, nous sommes tombés, elles sont tombées (he fell, she fell, we fell, they (fem.) fell)
- Il a acheté une voiture. Voilà la voiture qu'il a achetée. (He bought a car. Here is the car he bought)

As stand-alone verbs, the conjugation of the two auxiliaries is listed in the appendix at the end of the article.

== First group verbs (-er verbs) ==
French verbs ending in -er, which constitute the largest class, inflect somewhat differently from other verbs. The endings in the present simple singular are written -e (first person singular), -es (second person singular) and -e (third person singular), while in the other two groups the endings are more usually -s, -s and -t respectively. This variation is purely orthographic, as these endings are not pronounced in speech. Additional orthographic variations are also implemented to reflect pronunciation; see below for spelling rules.

The first group is demonstrated below with parler.

Infinitive: parl-er "to speak"
	Indicative				Subjunctive		Conditional	Imperative
	Present	Past simple	Imperfect	Future	Present	Imperfect	Present	Present
je	parl-e	parl-ai	parl-ais	parler-ai	parl-e	parl-ass-e	parler-ais	
tu	parl-es	parl-as	parl-ais	parler-as	parl-es	parl-ass-es	parler-ais	parl-e
il/elle	parl-e	parl-a	parl-ait	parler-a	parl-e	parl-ât	parler-ait	
nous	parl-ons	parl-âmes	parl-ions	parler-ons	parl-ions	parl-ass-ions	parler-ions	parl-ons
vous	parl-ez	parl-âtes	parl-iez	parler-ez	parl-iez	parl-ass-iez	parler-iez	parl-ez
ils/elles	parl-ent	parl-èrent	parl-aient	parler-ont	parl-ent	parl-ass-ent	parler-aient	

Present participle: parl-ant
Past participle: parl-é
Auxiliary verb: avoir (arriver, entrer, monter, passer, rester, rentrer, retourner, and tomber use être)

Spelling rules:

- In -cer verbs, the c becomes a ç before endings that start with a or o, to indicate that it is still pronounced /s/ (je déplac-e - nous déplaç-ons); similarly, in -ger verbs, the g becomes ge before such endings, to indicate that it is pronounced /ʒ/ (je mange : nous mangeons).
- In -oyer and -uyer verbs, the y becomes an i before endings that start with a silent e (nous envoyons : j'envoie); in -ayer verbs, this change is optional; both je paye and je paie are accepted as standard. Additionally, the future and conditional forms of envoyer start with enverr- rather than envoyer-; and similarly with renvoyer.
- In -é[C]er verbs, where [C] is a consonant, the é becomes an è before silent endings, and optionally in the future and conditional tenses. For example, répéter (to repeat) -> je répète (present) / je répéterai or je répèterai (future) / je répéterais or je répèterais (conditional).
- In -e[C]er verbs other than most -eler and -eter verbs, the e becomes an è before endings that start with a silent e (including the future and conditional endings). For example: peler (to peel) -> je pèle (present) / je pèlerai (future) / je pèlerais (conditional).
- In most -eler and -eter verbs, e is changed to an è before endings that start with a silent e, and l or t are changed to ll or tt. In the rest of these verbs, only one or the other form is considered standard. For example: appeler (to call) -> j'appelle (present) / j'appellerai (future) / j'appellerais (conditional).
- The verbal adjective of following verbs is irregular: adhérer - adhérent; coïncider - coïncident; confluer - confluent; affluer - affluent; converger - convergent; déterger - détergent; différer - différent; exceller - excellent; diverger - divergent; négliger - négligent; précéder - précédent; violer - violent; influer - influent; communiquer - communicant; suffoquer - suffocant; provoquer - provocant; naviguer - navigant; déléguer - délégant; fatiguer - fatigant; intriguer - intrigant.

Exceptional contexts:

- When the first-person singular present tense form of the indicative or subjunctive is found in inversion, authorities require that the final e is changed to either é (traditional usage) or è (modern usage), in order to link the two words : Parlè-je ?, "Am I speaking?". However, this construction is very rare (most common usage in speech and writing would be, Est-ce que je parle ?)
- When the second-person singular form of the imperative is followed by its object y or en, a final s is added: Parles-en !, "Talk about it!"

Irregular verbs:

- envoyer is an irregular in the future and conditional stem - j'enverrai etc., j'enverrais etc. Similarly: renvoyer "resend"
- aller, though it ends in -er, belongs to the third group.

== Second group verbs (-ir verbs / present participle ending in -issant) ==
The -ir verbs differ from the -er verbs in the following points:

- The vowel of the inflections is always -i-, for example -isse in the past subjunctive rather than the -asse of the -er verbs.
- A few of the singular inflections themselves change, though this is purely orthographic and does not affect the pronunciation: in the present simple and past simple, these are -s, -s, -t rather than -Ø, -s, -Ø. (The change in pronunciation is due to the change of vowel from e, ai, a to -i-.)
- In the present simple, imperfect, the present subjunctive, and the present participle, a suffix -iss- appears between the root and the inflectional endings. In the present simple singular, this suffix has disappeared and the endings are -is, -is, -it.

Infinitive : choisir "to choose"
	Indicative				Subjunctive		Conditional	Imperative
	Present	Past simple	Imperfect	Future	Present	Imperfect	Present	Present
je	chois-is		chois-iss-ais	choisir-ai	chois-iss-e		choisir-ais	
tu	chois-is		chois-iss-ais	choisir-as	chois-iss-es		choisir-ais	chois-is
il/elle	chois-it		chois-iss-ait	choisir-a	chois-iss-e	chois-ît	choisir-ait	
nous	chois-iss-ons	chois-îmes	chois-iss-ions	choisir-ons	chois-iss-ions		choisir-ions	chois-iss-ons
vous	chois-iss-ez	chois-îtes	chois-iss-iez	choisir-ez	chois-iss-iez		choisir-iez	chois-iss-ez
ils/elles	chois-iss-ent	chois-irent	chois-iss-aient	choisir-ont	chois-iss-ent		choisir-aient	

Present participle: chois-iss-ant
Past participle: chois-i
Auxiliary verb: avoir (partir uses être)

== Third group verbs ==
Verbs of the third group have infinitive endings -

- 1st section: -ir, with the present participle ending in -ant
- 2nd section: -oir
- 3rd section: -re
- aller is included in the third group.

The third group contains all verbs not contained in the first two. While the first and second group have very few irregular members there is a great deal of variation in the third group. Nearly all verbs classified as irregular are included in the third group.

The first source of variation in irregular verbs is stem changes. Stem changes can occur in six places. It is possible to say that the verbs have seven principal parts, the first being the infinitive itself. No verb has separate stems for all seven parts; instead, rather they tend to "inherit" the same stem as another part.

Principal part	How to get the stem	"Inherited" (regular) value of stem	Key
infinitive	Remove ending -er, -ir, -oir, -re	—	INF
First singular present indicative	Remove ending -s, -e	Infinitive stem (INF)	1S
First plural present indicative	Remove ending -ons	Infinitive stem (INF)	1P
Third plural present indicative	Remove ending -ent	First plural present stem (1P)	3P
(First singular) future	Remove ending -ai	Full infinitive, minus any -e	FUT
(Masculine singular) past participle	Full word	Infinitive stem (INF), plus -u for -re ending else plus -i	PP
(First singular) past simple	Remove ending -s, -ai	Past participle (PP), minus any -s or -t	PAST

The following table shows a conjugation scheme that allows for stem changes. As presented, the table accommodates not only third group verbs but also second group verbs, both having basically the same endings.

A regular second group verb would appear with a stem change in the 1P position and would require a little attention to the 1S stem. The verb choisir is included to represent regular second verbs and haïr is listed as an irregular second group verb. First group verbs would have different endings in some cases but no stem change.

	Indicative				Subjunctive		Conditional	Imperative
	**Present**	**Past simple**	**Imperfect**	**Future**	**Present**	**Imperfect**	**Present**	**Present**
**je**	**1S**+s	**PAST**+s	**1P**+ais	**FUT**+ai	**3P**+e	**PAST**+sse	**FUT**+ais	
**tu**	**1S**+s	**PAST**+s	**1P**+ais	**FUT**+as	**3P**+es	**PAST**+sses	**FUT**+ais	**1S**+s / **1S**+t^{2}
**il**/**elle**	**1S**+t^{1}	**PAST**+t	**1P**+ait	**FUT**+a	**3P**+e	**PAST**+ˆt	**FUT**+ait	
**nous**	**1P**+ons	**PAST**+ˆmes	**1P**+ions	**FUT**+ons	**1P**+ions	**PAST**+ssions	**FUT**+ions	**1P**+ons
**vous**	**1P**+ez	**PAST**+ˆtes	**1P**+iez	**FUT**+ez	**1P**+iez	**PAST**+ssiez	**FUT**+iez	**1P**+ez
**ils**/**elles**	**3P**+ent	**PAST**+rent	**1P**+aient	**FUT**+ont	**3P**+ent	**PAST**+ssent	**FUT**+aient	

^{1} A spelling rule applies here.
^{2} +t if ends with vowel, else +s.
Present participle: 1P-ant
Past participle: PP

Spelling rules

- In the indicative present third person singular the -t is regularly dropped when directly following a d or t (e.g. il vend "he sells", not *il vendt).

The following table gives the stem changes or principal parts for a number of irregular verbs. Stems that are irregular in the sense of being unpredictable by the above rules are given in boldface.

Occasionally endings depart from the norm. This is the second source of irregularity.

Such cases are listed in the table following, again with the irregular occurrences highlighted in bold.

Stem changes (principal parts) of French verbs
^{7}	INF	Meaning	FUT	Present Indicative			PP	PAST	
^{7}	INF	Meaning	FUT	1S	1P	3P	PP	PAST	
**G2**	chois-ir^{4}	choose	choisir-ai	**choisi**-s	**choisiss**-ons	choisiss-ent	choisi	choisi-s	^{5}
	ha-ïr	hate	haïr-ai	**hai-s** / **haï**-s^{1}	**haïss**-ons	haïss-ent	haï	haï-s	^{5}
**G3**	part-ir^{4}	leave	partir-ai	**par-s**	part-ons	part-ent	parti	parti-s	^{5}
	vêt-ir^{4}	dress	vêtir-ai	vêt-s^{*}	vêt-ons	vêt-ent	**vêtu**	vêti-s	^{5}
	requér-ir	require, demand	**requerr-ai**	**requier-s**	requér-ons	**requièr-ent**	**requis**	requi-s	
	ven-ir^{4}	come	**viendr-ai**	**vien-s**	ven-ons	**vienn-ent**	**venu**	**vin-s**	^{5}
	mour-ir	die	**mourr-ai**	**meur-s**	mour-ons	**meur-ent**	**mort**	**mouru-s**	
	cour-ir	run	**courr-ai**	cour-s	cour-ons	cour-ent	**couru**	couru-s	
	ouvr-ir^{4}	open	ouvrir-ai	ouvr-e^{*}	ouvr-ons	ouvr-ent	**ouvert**	ouvri-s	^{5}
	cueill-ir	gather	**cueiller-ai**	cueill-e^{*}	cueill-ons	cueill-ent	cueilli	cueilli-s	^{5}
	asse-oir (1)	sit	**assiér-ai**	**assied-s**	**assey-ons**	assey-ent	**assis**	assi-s	^{5}
	asse-oir (2)	sit	**assoir-ai**	**assoi-s**	**assoy-ons**	**assoi-ent**	**assis**	assi-s	^{5}
	voir^{4}	see	**verr-ai**	**voi-s**	**voy-ons**	voi-ent^{3}	**vu**	**vi-s**	
	recev-oir^{4}	receive	**recevr-ai**	**reçoi-s**	recev-ons	**reçoiv-ent**	**reçu**	reçu-s	
	dev-oir	owe, must	**devr-ai**	**doi-s**	dev-ons	**doiv-ent**	**dû**	du-s	
	mouv-oir	move	**mouvr-ai**	**meu-s**	mouv-ons	**meuv-ent**	**mû**	mu-s	
	émouv-oir^{4}	move, affect	**émouvr-ai**	**émeu-s**	émouv-ons	**émeuv-ent**	**ému**	ému-s	
	choir^{4}	fall	**choir-ai / cherr-ai**	**choi-s**	**choy-ons**	choi-ent^{3}	**chu**	chu-s	
	pleuv-oir	rain	**pleuvr-a**	**pleu-t**	**pleuv-**^{6}	pleuv-^{6}	**plu**	plu-t	^{5}
	vend-re^{4}	sell	vendr-ai	vend-s^{*}	vend-ons	vend-ent	vendu	**vendi-s**	^{5}
	batt-re	beat	battr-ai	**bat-s**	batt-ons	batt-ent	battu	**batti-s**	^{5}
	romp-re	break	rompr-ai	romp-s	romp-ons	romp-ent	rompu	**rompi-s**	^{5}
	vainc-re^{4}	conquer	vaincr-ai	vainc-s^{*}	**vainqu-ons**	vainqu-ent	vaincu	**vainqui-s**	^{5}
	craind-re^{4}	fear	craindr-ai	**crain-s**	**craign-ons**	craign-ent	**craint**	**craign-is**	
	condui-re^{4}	lead	conduir-ai	condui-s	**conduis-ons**	conduis-ent	**conduit**	**conduisi-s**	
	trai-re^{4}	milk	trair-ai	trai-s	tray-ons^{3}	trai-ent^{3}	**trai-t**	**tray-ai**	^{5}
	prend-re^{4}	take	prendr-ai	prend-s	**pren-ons**	**prenn-ent**	**pris**	pri-s	
	mett-re^{4}	put	mettr-ai	**met-s**	mett-ons	mett-ent	**mis**	mi-s	
	écri-re^{4}	write	écrir-ai	écri-s	**écriv-ons**	écriv-ent	**écrit**	**écrivi-s**	
	boi-re	drink	boir-ai	boi-s	**buv-ons**	**boiv-ent**	**bu**	bu-s	
	di-re^{4}	say, tell	dir-ai	di-s	**dis-ons, dites**	dis-ent	**dit**	di-s	
	li-re	read	lir-ai	li-s	**lis-ons**	lis-ent	**lu**	lu-s	
	suffi-re^{4}	suffice	suffir-ai	suffi-s	**suffis-ons**	suffis-ent	**suffi**	suffi-s	
	plai-re^{4}	please	plair-ai	plai-s^{*}	**plais-ons**	**plais-ent**	**plu**	plu-s	^{5}
	croi-re	believe	croir-ai	croi-s	croy-ons^{3}	croi-ent^{3}	**cru**	cru-s	
	brui-re	make a low noise	bruir-ai	brui-t	**bruiss-**^{6}	**bruiss-ent**	**brui**	brui-t	
	maudi-re	curse	maudir-ai	maudi-t	**maudiss-ons**	**maudiss-ent**	**maudit**	maudi-t	^{5}
	ri-re^{4}	laugh	rir-ai	ri-s	ri-ons	ri-ent	**ri**	ri-s	
	conclu-re^{4}	conclude	conclur-ai	conclu-s	conclu-ons	conclu-ent	conclu	conclu-s	
	viv-re^{4}	live	vivr-ai	**vi-s**	viv-ons	viv-ent	**vécu**	vécu-s	
	suiv-re^{4}	follow	suivr-ai	**sui-s**	suiv-ons	suiv-ent	**suivi**	suivi-s	
	connaît-re^{4}	know	connaîtr-ai	**connai-s**^{*}	**connaiss-ons**	connaiss-ent	**connu**	connu-s	^{5}
	naît-re	be born	naîtr-ai	**nai-s**^{*}	**naiss-ons**	naiss-ent	**né**	**naqui-s**	^{5}
	coud-re	sew	coudr-ai	coud-s^{*}	**cous-ons**	cous-ent	**cousu**	cousi-s	
	moud-re	grind, mill	moudr-ai	moud-s^{*}	**moul-ons**	moul-ent	**moulu**	moulu-s	
	résoud-re	solve, resolve	résoudr-ai	**résou-s**	**résolv-ons**	résolv-ent	**résolu**	résolu-s	
	absoud-re	solve, absolve	absoudr-ai	**absou-s**	**absolv-ons**	absolv-ent	**absous**^{*}	**absolu-s**	^{5}
	clo-re	close	clor-ai	clo-s^{*}	**clos-ons**	clos-ent	**clos**	–	^{5}

^{*} See following table for exceptions.
^{1} Only in Quebec French.
^{3} Alternation of "-ai-" and -oi- before consonant or unstressed e, "-ay-" and -oy- before other vowels is automatic in all verbs.
^{6} The stem is inferred though the usual rule does not apply.
^{7} Read G2 as a sub-heading meaning that the following two entries are in group 2. G3 indicates that all following entries are in group 3.

Exceptions
vêtir	Indicative present sg.	je vêts, tu vêts, il vêt^{2}
venir	Past simple pl.	nous **vînmes**, vous **vîntes**, ils vinrent
ouvrir	Indicative present sg.	j' **ouvre, tu** ouvres, il **ouvre**
cueillir	Indicative present sg.	je **cueille**, tu **cueilles**, il **cueille**
asseoir	Indicative present sg.	j'assieds, tu assieds, il assied^{2}
vendre	Indicative present sg.	je vends, tu vends, il vend^{2}
battre	Indicative present sg.	je bats, tu bats, il bat^{2}
vaincre	Indicative present sg.	je vaincs, tu vaincs, il **vainc**
prendre	Indicative present sg.	je prends, tu prends, il prend^{2}
mettre	Indicative present sg.	je mets, tu mets, il met^{2}
plaire	Indicative present sg.	je plais, tu plais, il **plaît**
connaître	Indicative present sg.	je connais, tu connais, il **connaît**
naître	Indicative present sg.	je nais, tu nais, **il naît**
coudre	Indicative present sg.	je couds, tu couds, il coud^{2}
moudre	Indicative present sg.	je mouds, tu mouds, il moud^{2}
clore	Indicative present sg.	je clos, tu clos, il **clôt**
absoudre	Past participle	absous, **absoute** (fem)

^{2} Case of -t being dropped when directly following a d or t.
^{4} See following table for similar verbs.
^{5} See following table for notes.

choisir	Note: Choisir is a regular 2nd group verb
haïr	Note: Haïr is 2nd group verb with the exception that in Sing. pres. indic. the diaeresis drops out
partir	Note: Sing. pres. indic. stem drops last consonant of basic stem: je pars, dors, mens, sors, sens, sers Similarly conjugated verbs: se départir "divest", repartir "leave again", dormir "sleep", s'endormir "fall asleep", se rendormir "fall back asleep", mentir "lie (tell lies)", démentir "contradict", sentir "feel", consentir "agree", pressentir "foresee", ressentir "feel", servir "serve", desservir "clear away", resservir "serve again", sortir "go out", ressortir "come back"
vêtir	Note: The same as partir, except for the past participle Similar: dévêtir "undress", revêtir "cover"
venir	Similar: revenir "return", devenir "become", se souvenir "remember", parvenir "reach", prévenir "tell beforehand"; tenir "hold", retenir "memorize", contretenir "talk", soutenir "sustain", maintenir "maintain", appartenir "belong", etc.
ouvrir	Note: Sing. pres. indic. uses endings -e -es -e, as with -er verbs Similar: couvrir "cover", découvrir "discover", offrir "offer", souffrir "suffer"
cueillir	Note: Like ouvrir except the future; sing. pres. indic. uses endings -e -es -e, as with -er verbs
asseoir	Asseoir has two possible conjugations
voir	Similar: revoir "see again", prévoir "foresee"
recevoir	Similar: Other verbs in -cevoir, e.g. apercevoir "perceive", concevoir "conceive", décevoir "disappoint"
devoir	Note: Very similar to recevoir, but adds a circumflex to du - due, dus and dues remain unchanged
mouvoir	Adds a circumflex to mu - mue, mus and mues remain unchanged
émouvoir	Similar: promouvoir "promote"
choir	Missing the indicative imperfect and the subjunctive mood (except by chût, in singular 3rd person imperfect subjunctive) Similar: échoir "befall"
pleuvoir	Impersonal (3rd-singular only)
vendre	So-called "regular -re" verbs; all end in -dre, but not -indre Similar: attendre "wait", défendre "defend", descendre "go down", entendre "hear", étendre "extend", fondre "melt", pendre "hang", perdre "lose", prétendre "pretend", rendre "return, give back", répandre "spill", répondre "respond", etc.
battre	Close to vendre
rompre	Very close to vendre
vaincre	Essentially same as vendre, except for c/qu variation Similar: convaincre "convince"
craindre	Similar: All verbs in -aindre, -eindre, -oindre, e.g. contraindre "compel", plaindre "complain"; atteindre "reach", ceindre "gird", empreindre "stamp", éteindre "turn off", étreindre "hug", feindre "pretend", geindre "whine", peindre "paint", restreindre "restrict", teindre "dye"; joindre "join", oindre "anoint", poindre "dawn", rejoindre "rejoin"
conduire	Similar: All verbs in -uire e.g. construire "build", cuire "cook", détruire "destroy", instruire "instruct", réduire "reduce", produire "produce", traduire "translate", etc.
traire	PS is conjugated as in 1st group verbs. Similar: contraire "contract", extraire "extract", soustraire "subtract", retraire "withdraw"
prendre	Similar: comprendre "understand", apprendre "study", reprendre "take again", etc.
mettre	Similar: promettre "promise", permettre "permit", compromettre "compromise, damage", soumettre "submit, subdue", transmettre "transmit"
écrire	Similar: décrire "describe", inscrire "inscribe"
suffire	Similar: confire "pickle", circoncire "circumcise", frire "fry"
plaire	Similar: déplaire "displease"
bruire	Rare outside of third person, conjugated like choisir (regular -ir verbs)
maudire	Very close to bruire
rire	Similar: sourire "smile"
conclure	Similar: Other verbs in -clure
vivre	Similar: revivre "come alive again", survivre "survive"
suivre	Similar: poursuivre "pursue"
connaître	Similar: reconnaître "recognize", paraître "seem", apparaître "appear", reparaître "reappear", disparaître "disappear"
naître	Note the 3rd sg. naît
absoudre	The same as résoudre, except for the past participle. Note the masculine absous and feminine absoute
clore	Missing the subjunctive and indicative imperfect, as well as the past simple tense. Note the 3rd sg. clôt

=== Example ===
Infinitive: recevoir "receive"
INF: recev-
1S: reçoi-
1P: recev-
3P: reçoiv-
FUT: recevr-
PP: reçu-
PAST: reçu-

	Indicative				Subjunctive		Conditional	Imperative
	**Present**	**Past simple**	**Imperfect**	**Future**	**Present**	**Imperfect**	**Present**	**Present**
**je**	reçoi-s	reçu-s	recev-ais	recevr-ai	reçoiv-e	reçu-sse	recevr-ais	
**tu**	reçoi-s	reçu-s	recev-ais	recevr-as	reçoiv-es	reçu-sses	recevr-ais	reçoi-s
**il**/**elle**	reçoi-t	reçu-t	recev-ait	recevr-a	reçoiv-e	reçû-t	recevr-ait	
**nous**	recev-ons	reçû-mes	recev-ions	recevr-ons	recev-ions	reçu-ssions	recevr-ions	recev-ons
**vous**	recev-ez	reçû-tes	recev-iez	recevr-ez	recev-iez	reçu-ssiez	recevr-iez	recev-ez
**ils**/**elles**	reçoiv-ent	reçu-rent	recev-aient	recevr-ont	reçoiv-ent	reçu-ssent	recevr-aient	

Present participle: recev-ant
Past participle: reçu

=== Verbs with irregular subjunctive stem ===
There are nine verbs which have an irregular subjunctive stem. These verbs are generally the most irregular verbs in French. With them verbs the 3P stem plays no role and the 1S stem is little use in inferring the present indicative inflections. Many of them construct the present indicative (especially the singular) in an idiosyncratic fashion. The verb aller also constructs its past participle and past simple differently, according to the endings for -er verbs.

A feature with these verbs is the competition between the SUBJ stem and the 1P stem to control the first and second plural present subjunctive, the imperative and the present participle, in ways that vary from verb to verb.

The paradigm taking into account the subjunctive stem is shown in the following table. The keys 1S etc are as for the 7 principal part irregular verbs. In addition SUBJ stands for first person singular present subjunctive stem.

	Indicative				Subjunctive		Conditional	Imperative
	Present	Past simple	Imperfect	Future	Present	Imperfect	Present	Present
je	**1S**+s	**PAST**+s	**1P**+ais	**FUT**+ai	**SUBJ**+e	**PAST**+sse	**FUT**+ais	
tu	**1S**+s	**PAST**+s	**1P**+ais	**FUT**+as	**SUBJ**+es	**PAST**+sses	**FUT**+ais	**1S**+s / **1S**+t^{1} or **SUBJ**+e
il/elle	**1S**+t	**PAST**+t	**1P**+ait	**FUT**+a	**SUBJ**+e	**PAST**+ˆt	**FUT**+ait	
nous	**1P**+ons	**PAST**+ˆmes	**1P**+ions	**FUT**+ons	**SUBJ**+ions or **1P**+ions	**PAST**+ssions	**FUT**+ions	**1P**+ons or **SUBJ**+ons
vous	**1P**+ez	**PAST**+ˆtes	**1P**+iez	**FUT**+ez	**SUBJ**+iez or **1P**+iez	**PAST**+ssiez	**FUT**+iez	**1P**+ez or **SUBJ**+ez
ils/elles	**3P**+ent	**PAST**+rent	**1P**+aient	**FUT**+ont	**SUBJ**+ent	**PAST**+ssent	**FUT**+aient	

^{1} +t if ends with vowel, else +s
Present participle: 1P-ant or SUBJ-ant
Past participle: PP(e)(s)

The following table gives the principal parts of the nine verbs. Stems that are irregular in the sense of being unpredictable by the above rules are shown in boldface. The column headed 1/2 Plural tells whether the subjunctive 1st and 2nd person plural follow the subjunctive stem or the 1P indicative stem. Likewise the Imperative column and the Present Participle column. Still there are irregularities where the inflections depart from the paradigm. These cases are indicated with an asterisk and the exceptional inflections are listed separately.

Table of the highly irregular French verbs
INF	Meaning	FUT	1P	Present Subjunctive		Imperative	Present Participle	PP	PAST	
INF	Meaning	FUT	1P	SUBJ	1/2 Plural	Imperative	Present Participle	PP	PAST	
pouv-oir	be able, can	pourr-ai	pouv-ons	**puiss-e**	**SUBJ**+...	**1P**+...	**1P**+ant^{2}	**pu**	pu-s	
sav-oir	know	saur-ai	sav-ons	**sach-e**	**SUBJ**+...	**SUBJ**+...	**SUBJ**+ant	**su**	su-s	
voul-oir	want	voudr-ai	voul-ons	**veuill-e**	**1P**+...	**SUBJ**+...	**1P**+ant	voulu	voulu-s	
val-oir	be worth	vaudr-ai	val-ons	**vaill-e**	**1P**+...	**1P**+...^{*}	**1P**+ant	valu	valu-s	
fall-oir	be necessary	faudr-a	fall-^{6}	**faill-e**	–	–	–	fallu	fallu-t	^{2}
fai-re^{1}	do	fer-ai	**fais-ons**^{*}	**fass-e**	**SUBJ**+...	**1P**+...	**1P**+ant	**fait**	**fi-s**	
av-oir	have	aur-ai	av-ons	**ai-e**	**SUBJ**+...^{*}	**SUBJ**+...	**SUBJ**+ant	**eu**	eu-s	
êt-re	be	ser-ai	**ét-**^{6}	**soi-**^{6}	**SUBJ**+...^{*}	**SUBJ**+...^{*}	**1P**+ant	**été**	**fu-s**	
all-er	go	ir-ai	all-ons	**aill-e**	**1P**+...	**1P**+...^{*}	**1P**+ant	allé	**all-ai**	

^{*} See following table for exceptions.

Exceptions
pouvoir	Indicative present	je **peux**, tu **peux**, il peut, nous pouvons, vous pouvez, ils **peuvent**	
savoir	Indicative present	je **sais**, tu **sais**, il **sait**, nous savons, vous savez, ils savent	
vouloir	Indicative present	je **veux**, tu **veux**, il **veut**, nous voulons, vous voulez, ils **veulent**	
valoir	Indicative present	je **vaux**, tu **vaux**, il **vaut**, nous valons, vous valez, ils valent	
valoir	Imperative	vaux! valons! valez!	
falloir	Indicative present	il **faut**	
faire	Indicative present	je fais, tu fais, il fait, nous **faisons**, vous faites, ils **font**	
faire	Imperative	fais! faisons! faites!	
avoir	Indicative present	j' **ai**, tu **as**, il **a**, nous avons, vous avez, ils **ont**	
avoir	Subjunctive	j'aie, tu aies, il aie, nous **ayons**, vous **ayez**, ils aient	
avoir	Imperative	aie! ayons! ayez!	
être	Indicative present	je **suis**, tu **es**, il **est**, nous **sommes**, vous **êtes**, ils **sont**	
être	Subjunctive	**je sois**, tu **sois**, il **soit**; nous **soyons**, vous **soyez**, ils soient	
être	Imperative	sois! soyons! soyez!	
aller	Indicative present	je **vais**, tu **vas**, il **va**, nous allons, vous allez, ils **vont**	^{3}
aller	Imperative	**va**! allons! allez!	^{2}

^{1} See following table for similar verbs.
^{2} See following table for notes.
^{3} In Classical French and even in certain dialects (like in Cajun and some Quebec dialects) je vas is used.

pouvoir	alternate 1st sing. puis required in questions, use elsewhere is mannered; note that old pres. part. puiss-ant is attested as an adjective "powerful"
falloir	Impersonal (3rd-singular only)
faire	Similarly conjugated verbs: défaire, refaire, satisfaire
aller	2nd. sg. imperat. va, but **vas-y** "go there"

== Appendix. Conjugation of Avoir, Être and Aller ==
=== Avoir ===
This verb has different stems for different tenses. These are imperfect av-; present subjunctive ai- future and conditional aur-; past simple and past subjunctive e-. Although the stem changes, the inflections of these tenses are as a regular -oir verb.

In the present, not only are there stem changes, but the inflections are irregular as well:

Avoir "to have"
	Indicative				Subjunctive		Conditional	Imperative
	Present	Past simple	Imperfect	Future	Present	Imperfect	Present	Present
j'	ai	eus	avais	aurai	aie	eusse	aurais	
tu	as	eus	avais	auras	aies	eusses	aurais	aie^{1}
il/elle/on	a	eut	avait	aura	ait	eût	aurait	
nous	avons	eûmes	avions	aurons	ayons	eussions	aurions	ayons^{1}
vous	avez	eûtes	aviez	aurez	ayez	eussiez	auriez	ayez^{1}
ils/elles	ont	eurent	avaient	auront	aient	eussent	auraient	

^{1} Notice that the imperative form uses the subjunctive conjugation.

Non-finite forms:

- Infinitive: avoir
- Present participle: ayant
- Past participle: eu

Auxiliary verb: avoir

=== Être ===
This verb has different stems for different tenses. These are all pronounced differently: imperfect ét-; present subjunctive soi-; future and conditional ser-; past simple and past subjunctive in f-. The inflections of these tenses are as a regular -oir verb (that is, as an -re verb but with the vowel u /y/ in the f- forms). For example, subjunctive soyons, soyez is pronounced with the y sound of other -re and -oir verbs.

In the present simple, not only are there stem changes, but the inflections are irregular as well:

Être "to be"
	Indicative				Subjunctive		Conditional	Imperative
	Present	Past simple	Imperfect	Future	Present	Imperfect	Present	Present
je	suis	fus	étais	serai	sois	fusse	serais	
tu	es	fus	étais	seras	sois	fusses	serais	sois^{1}
il/elle/on	est	fut	était	sera	soit	fût	serait	
nous	sommes	fûmes	étions	serons	soyons	fussions	serions	soyons^{1}
vous	êtes	fûtes	étiez	serez	soyez	fussiez	seriez	soyez^{1}
ils/elles	sont	furent	étaient	seront	soient	fussent	seraient	

^{1} The imperative form uses the subjunctive conjugation.

The non-finite forms use the stem êt- /ɛt/ (before a consonant)/ét- /et/ (before a vowel):

- Infinitive: être
- Present participle: étant
- Past participle: été

Auxiliary verb: avoir

=== Aller ===
The verb aller means "to go" and is sufficiently irregular that it merits listing its conjugation in full, due to being a suppletive verb. It is the only verb with the first group ending "er" to have an irregular conjugation. It belongs to none of the three sections of the third group, and is often categorized on its own. The verb has different stems for different tenses. These are all pronounced differently: past all- /al/ (past simple, imperfect, past subjunctive); present subjunctive aill-; conditional and future ir-. The inflections of these tenses are completely regular, and pronounced as in any other -er verb. However, in the present simple, not only are there stem changes, but the inflections are irregular as well:

Aller "to go"
	Indicative				Subjunctive		Conditional	Imperative
	Present	Past simple	Imperfect	Future	Present	Imperfect	Present	Present
je	vais, vas^{1}	allai	allais	irai	aille	allasse	irais	
tu	vas	allas	allais	iras	ailles	allasses	irais	va
il/elle/on	va	alla	allait	ira	aille	allât	irait	
nous	allons	allâmes	allions	irons	allions	allassions	irions	allons
vous	allez	allâtes	alliez	irez	alliez	allassiez	iriez	allez
ils/elles	vont	allèrent	allaient	iront	aillent	allassent	iraient	

The non-finite forms are all based on all- :

- Infinitive: aller
- Present participle: allant
- Past participle: allé

Auxiliary verb: être

^{1} In Classical French and even in certain dialects (like in Cajun and some Quebec dialects) je vas is used.

== See also ==
- Bescherelle, a reference book for (usually French) verb conjugation
- Larousse de la conjugaison, 1980.
