= Historical present =

Employment of present tense when narrating past events

In linguistics and rhetoric, the historical present or historic present, also called dramatic present or narrative present, is the employment of the present tense instead of past tenses when narrating past events. It is also often called the "literary present tense". It is typically thought to heighten the dramatic force of the narrative by describing events as if they were still unfolding, and/or by foregrounding some events relative to others.

== Uses in English ==
In English, it is used in:

- historical chronicles (listing a series of events),
- fiction,
- news headlines, and
- everyday conversation, when recounting events as dramatized stories. In casual conversation, it is particularly common with quotative verbs such as say and go, and especially the newer quotative like.

== Examples ==
In an excerpt from Charles Dickens's David Copperfield, the shift from the past tense to the historical present gives a sense of immediacy, as of a recurring vision:

If the funeral had been yesterday, I could not recollect it better. The very air of the best parlour, when I went in at the door, the bright condition of the fire, the shining of the wine in the decanters, the patterns of the glasses and plates, the faint sweet smell of cake, the odour of Miss Murdstone's dress, and our black clothes. Mr. Chillip is in the room, and comes to speak to me.

"And how is Master David?" he says, kindly.

I cannot tell him very well. I give him my hand, which he holds in his.

— Charles Dickens, David Copperfield, Chapter IX

Standard past tense: William the Conqueror traveled to England with his army of Normans and defeated King Harold at Hastings.

Historical present: In 1066, William the Conqueror travels to England with his army of Normans and defeats King Harold at Hastings.

Novels that are written entirely in the historical present include notably John Updike's Rabbit, Run, Hilary Mantel's Wolf Hall and Margaret Atwood's The Handmaid's Tale.

== In describing fiction ==
Summaries of the narratives (plots) of works of fiction are conventionally presented using the present tense, rather than the past tense. At any particular point of the story, as it unfolds, there is a now and so a past and a future, so whether some event mentioned in the story is past, present, or future, changes as the story progresses. The entire plot description is presented as if the story's now were a continuous present. Thus, in summarizing the plot of A Tale of Two Cities, one may write:

Manette is obsessed with making shoes, a trade he learnt while in prison.

== In other languages ==
The historical present is widely used in writing about history in Latin (where it is sometimes referred to by its Latin name, praesens historicum) and some modern European languages.

In French, the historical present is often used in journalism and in historical texts to report events in the past.

The extinct language Shasta appeared to allow the historical present in narratives.

The New Testament, written in Koine Greek in the 1st century AD, is notable for use of the historical present, particularly in the Gospel of Mark.

== See also ==
- Future tense
- Grammatical tense
- Past tense
- Passé simple – the historical past in French
- Preterite
- Uses of English verb forms

== Sources ==
- Brinton, L. J. (1992). "The historical present in Charlotte Bronte's novels: Some discourse functions". Style. 26 (2): 221–244.
- Huddleston, R; Pullum, G. K. (2002). The Cambridge Grammar of the English Language. Cambridge: Cambridge University Press. ISBN 0-521-43146-8.
- Leech, G. N. (1971). Meaning and the English Verb. London: Longman. ISBN 0-582-52214-5.
