= Parte =

Parte is the Italian word for part. It can refer to:

- Part (music)
- Conjugation of French verb "partir"; see French conjugation

Surname

- Víctor de la Parte (b. 1986), Spanish cyclist

== See also ==
- Ex parte, Latin legal term for "by the party"
