= Nonpast tense =

Grammatical tense in some languages

The nonpast tense (also spelled non-past) (abbreviated npst) is a grammatical tense that distinguishes an action as taking place in times present or future. The nonpast tense contrasts with the past tense, which distinguishes an action as taking place prior to the moment of utterance.

== Distribution ==
The nonpast tense is observed in many languages. Due to a lack of future tense inflectional morphology on the verb stem, many languages that are popularly conceived as having a three-way tense distinction (between past, present, and future), can in fact be understood as having a two-way past-nonpast tense distinction.

For example, in English, future sentences often take present tense verb morphology, and do not contain specialized future tense verb morphology. In contrast, past tense sentences require specialized past tense morphology.

Compare the following sentences:

I hope he gets [nonpast] better tomorrow.

- The main verb gets is conjugated in the present tense, and the future is indicated lexically through the word tomorrow, and the sentence.

I hope he got [past] better yesterday.

- Requires the use of a specialized past tense form, got, for the main verb.
- Using gets instead is ungrammatical.

Examples of languages containing the nonpast tense
Language	Sentence	Translation
English	I hope he gets better tomorrow	
German	Ich gehe morgen	I go-1ps.npst tomorrow
Finnish	minä menen huomenna	I go-1ps.npst tomorrow
