= Nonfuture tense =

Grammatical tense indicating present or past

A nonfuture tense (abbreviated NFUT) is a grammatical tense that distinguishes a verbal action as having taken place in the past or the present, as opposed to the future tense. Nonfuture tense is found in languages such as Rukai, Greenlandic, Quechua, Yabem and Nivkh.
