= Tense confusion =

In prescriptive grammar of English, tense confusion is a purported grammatical or stylistic error which occurs when a writer shifts from the present tense to the past tense (or vice versa) in an embedded clause. The following example would be categorized as an instance of tense confusion since it shifts from past tense "saw" in the matrix clause to present tense "is" in the embedded clause.

- "He saw that she is very tall."

Research in linguistics regards such sentences as instances of the sequence of tense phenomenon. There is, in fact, a meaning contrast between the following two sentences. This meaning contrast is lost when so-called "tense confusions" are prescribed against.

- "He noticed that she ran every day" (implicature: she no longer runs every day or whether or not she still runs, he cannot validly conclude that she does)
- "He noticed that she runs every day" (no such implicature)

The first sentence implies that the proposition "she runs every day" no longer holds, while the second doesn't. Thus, different tenses in the embedded clause serve different communicative functions.
