= Latin tenses with modality =

This article covers free indications of frequency, probability, volition and obligation.

== Gerundive tenses ==
=== Present gerundive ===
The gerundive of the verb (an adjectival form ending in -ndus) can be combined with the verb sum 'I am' to make a passive periphrastic tense. This usually expresses what is needing to be done:

ego nec rogandus sum nec hortandus (Pliny)
'I don't need to be asked or encouraged' (i.e. I will do it willingly)

hī tumōres incīdendī sunt (Celsus)
'tumours of this kind need to be lanced'

=== Negative ===
The negative gerundive usually means 'not needing to be', as in the first example above. However, sometimes the interpretation 'ought not to be' or 'it isn't possible for it to be' is more appropriate:

illud enim iam nōn es admonendus nēminem bonum esse nisī sapientem (Seneca)
'you do not need to be reminded now that no one is good except the wise man'

Callimachī numerīs nōn est dīcendus Achillēs (Ovid)
'the story of Achilles shouldn't (or can't) be told using the metre of Callimachus'

=== Impersonal construction ===
Very often the passive periphrastic is used impersonally, together with a dative of the agent:

vōbīs hodiernō diē cōnstituendum est (Cicero)
'a decision needs to be made by you today'

The impersonal form of this tense can also be made using intransitive verbs such as eō 'I go' and verbs such as persuādeō 'I persuade' and ūtor 'I use' which do not take an accusative object:

nōn est respondendum ad omnia (Cicero)
'there is no need to reply to everything'

mihī Arpīnum eundum est (Cicero)
'I have to go to Arpinum'

tuō tibī iūdiciō est ūtendum (Cicero)
'you must use your judgement'

=== Future gerundive ===
An example of a future gerundive periphrastic is the following:

quoniam id quidem non potest, ōrandus erit nōbīs amīcus meus, M. Plaetōrius (Cicero)
'since that isn't possible, we will need to ask my friend, Marcus Plaetorius'

=== Imperfect gerundive ===
An example of the imperfect passive periphrastic is the following:

timēbat, nōn ea sōlum quae timenda erant, sed omnia (Cicero)
'he was afraid not only of those things which needed to be feared, but everything'

=== Perfect gerundive ===
As with the active perfect periphrastic, in a conditional sentence the perfect gerundive periphrastic tense can mean "would have done":

sī ūnum diem morātī essētis, moriendum omnibus fuit (Livy)
'if you had delayed just one day, you would all have died'

Another meaning of the perfect passive is "ought to have been done":

aut exercitus adimendus aut imperium dandum fuit (Cicero)
'either his army should have been taken away or he should have been given the command'

In the following result clause, this tense becomes subjunctive:

dē Pomptīnō rēctē scrībis. est enim ita ut, sī ante Kal. Iūniās Brundisī futūrus sit, minus urgendī fuerint M. Anneius et L. Tullius (Cicero)
'what you write about Pomptinus is correct: for the fact is that, if he is going to be in Brundisium before the 1st June, it wasn't so necessary for Marcus Anneius and Lucius Tullius to have been urged to hurry'

=== Future perfect gerundive ===
The active future perfect periphrastic tense is not found, but the passive occurs:

cum aedificandum fuerit, ante biennium ea saxa eximantur (Vitruvius)
'whenever (at some future time) it is necessary for a building to be made (using local stone), the stones for it should be quarried two years in advance'

For gerundive infinitive tenses see #Gerundive infinitives below.

== Subjunctive tenses ==
=== Wishes ===
The present subjunctive can express a wish for the future (the word utinam is usually added):

utinam illam diem videam! (Cicero)
'I hope I may see that day!'

The negative is nē:

nē vīvam sī sciō (Cicero)
'may I not live if I know!'

Less commonly, the perfect subjunctive expresses a wish for the past, leaving open the possibility that it may have happened:

utinam vērē augurāverim (Cicero)
'may I have prophesied correctly!'

hāc Trōiana tenus fuerit fortūna secūta (Virgil)
'may it turn out that Trojan ill-fortune has followed us this far, no further!'

The perfect subjunctive can also be used in a wish for the future, but this use is described as "archaic".

quod dī ōmen averterint! (Cicero)
'but may the gods avert this omen!'

The imperfect and pluperfect subjunctive are used in wishes to represent an imagined or wished for situation or event which is no longer capable of fulfilment:

utinam Servius Sulpicius vīveret! (Cicero)
'if only Servius Sulpicius were alive!'

utinam ille omnīs sēcum suās cōpiās ēduxisset! (Cicero)
'if only he had led out all his forces with him!'

Sometimes velim or vellem 'I would that' is used instead of utinam. In the following sentence, the imperfect subjunctive vellem is used to wish for something that cannot now come true, while the present subjunctive velim leaves open the possibility that it may be true:

dē Menedēmō vellem vērum fuisset, dē rēgīnā velim vērum sit. (Cicero)
'I wish it had been true about Menedemus; I hope it may be true about the queen'

=== Jussive subjunctive ===
When the present subjunctive has a jussive or hortatory meaning, it can be a suggestion or command in the 1st or 3rd person:

vīvāmus, mea Lesbia, atque amēmus (Catullus)
'let's live, my Lesbia, and let's love'

sedeat hīc (Gellius)
'let him sit here!'

exeant, proficīscantur, nē patiantur dēsideriō suī Catilīnam miserum tābēscere (Cicero)
'let them go out, let them depart; let them not allow poor Catiline to waste away with desire for them!'

In philosophy it can set the scene for a discussion:

vēndat aedēs vir bonus (Cicero)
'let us suppose that a good man is selling a house'

The jussive subjunctive is only used in the 2nd person when the person is indefinite:

exoriāre, aliquis nostrīs ex ossibus ultor! (Virgil)
'may you arise, some avenger, from our bones!'

Another use of the present or perfect subjunctive is concessive:

sit fūr, sit sacrilegus, sit flāgitiōrum omnium vitiōrumque prīnceps; at est bonus imperātor (Cicero)
'he may be a thief, he may be a temple robber, he may be the leader of all outrages and vices; nonetheless he is a good general!'

fuerit aliīs; tibī quandō esse coepit? (Cicero)
'he may have been so to others; when did begin to be so to you?'

The present and imperfect subjunctives are also used in deliberative questions (which are questions which expect an imperative answer):

dē Pompeiō quid agam? (Cicero)
'what action should I take about Pompey?'

quid facerem? (Virgil)
'what was I to do?'

With the negative particle nē the perfect subjunctive can express a negative command:

nē ... mortem timuerītis
'you should not fear death'

As with wishes and conditional sentences, the imperfect and pluperfect subjunctives can represent a situation which, because it is in the past, cannot now be changed. They describe something which should have been done in the past, but which it is now too late for:

at tū dictīs, Albāne, manērēs! (Virgil)
'you should have remained true to your words, o Alban!'

morerētur, inquiēs (Cicero)
'he should have died, you will say'

This usage is quite common in Plautus but rare in later Latin. The normal prose practice is to use either a past tense of dēbeō 'I have a duty to' or oportet 'it is proper' with the infinitive, or else a gerundive with a past tense of sum.

The jussive pluperfect is also fairly uncommon. The following examples are from Cicero, again using the negative nē:

nē popōscissēs (Cicero)
'you shouldn't have asked'

quid facere dēbuistī? pecūniam rettulissēs, frūmentum nē ēmissēs (Cicero)
'what was it your duty to do? you ought to have returned the money, you ought not to have bought the corn'

=== Possibility ===
After the word forsitan 'perhaps' and occasionally after fortasse 'perhaps', the present subjunctive can mean "may" or "could", expressing a possibility. The first example below uses the present subjunctive, and the second the perfect:

dūrum hoc fortasse videātur (Cicero)
'this may perhaps seem harsh'

forsitan temerē fēcerim (Cicero)
'perhaps I have acted rashly'

In the following sentence, using the pluperfect subjunctive, according to one view, Queen Dido contemplates what "might have been":

facēs in castra tulissem implēssemque forōs flammīs (Virgil)
'I could have carried torches into the camp and filled the gangways with flames'

Others see the pluperfect subjunctive in this sentence as a wish ("if only I had carried!"); others again as jussive ("I ought to have carried!").

=== Archaic mode for volitition ===
Another old subjunctive is duim, from the verb dō 'I give'. It occurs mostly in Plautus and Terence, but sometimes also in Cicero, in phrases like the following:

dī tē perduint! (Plautus)
'may the gods destroy you!'

=== Sigmatic aorist mode for volition ===
In old Latin, a form of the subjunctive with -s-, known as the sigmatic aorist subjunctive, is preserved (faxim, servāssim etc.). One use of this is for wishes for the future:

dī tē servāssint semper! (Plautus)
'may the gods preserve you always!'

deī faxint ut liceat! (Cicero)
'may the gods ensure that it be allowed'

In Plautus this subjunctive is also used in prohibitions, when it exists:

nīl mē cūrāssīs! (Plautus)
'don't worry about me!'

In other phrases it has a potential meaning and can be translated with "would":

male faxim lubēns (Plautus)
'I would willingly do him harm!'

nec satis sciō, nec, sī sciam, dīcere ausim (Livy)
'I do not know exactly, nor, if I knew, would I dare to say'

== Aspect comparison ==
=== Eram vs fuī as state verbs ===
In the verb sum 'I am', the imperfect tense eram and the perfect fuī both mean 'I was', but in Latin there is usually a difference. As with other verbs, the perfect is usually used when the length of time is mentioned:

diū ... silentium fuit (Livy)
'for a long time there was silence'

caecus multōs annōs fuit (Cicero)
'for many years he was blind'

But if the situation was still continuing at the time referred to, the imperfect is used:

equitum iam diū anceps pugna erat (Livy)
'the cavalry battle had been in doubt for a long time already (and was still in doubt)'

The perfect is also used when the sentence describes an event rather than a state:

aquae ingentēs eō annō fuērunt et Tiberis loca plāna urbis inundāvit (Livy)
'that year there were huge floods and the Tiber inundated the flat areas of the city'

fuistī igitur apud Laecam illā nocte, Catilīna! (Cicero)
'you were therefore there at Laeca's house that night, Catiline!' (i.e. you attended the meeting)

Another use of the perfect fuī is to describe a former state, emphasising that it is no longer in existence:

ego tam fuī quam vōs estis (Petronius)
'I was once just like you are'

statua Attī ... ad laevam cūriae fuit (Livy)
'there used to be a statue of Attus to the left of the senate house'

fuimus Trōes, fuit Īlium (Virgil)
'we have ceased to be Trojans; Troy is no more'

However, if a time adverb such as ōlim 'once upon a time' is added, there is no need for the perfect tense and the imperfect eram is more usual:

ōlim truncus eram fīculnus, inūtile lignum (Horace)
'once I was a fig-wood log, a useless piece of timber'

nōn sum quālis eram bonae sub regnō Cinarae (Horace)
'I am not the kind of man I was under the rule of good Cinara'

The perfect is also used in sentences such as the following, which describe a permanent state, as opposed to the imperfect, which describes a temporary one:

Samia mihī māter fuit; ea habitābat Rhodī (Terence)
'my mother was a Samian; she was living in Rhodes (at that time)'

apud Helvētiōs longē nōbilissimus fuit et dītissimus Orgetorix (Caesar)
'among the Helvetians by far the noblest and the most wealthy was Orgetorix'

According to Pinkster, the use of erat in these two examples would sound wrong. "In both cases the reader would want to know 'What happened next?'"

For geographical description, on the other hand, erat is used, describing the landscape was it was at the time of the narrative:

in eō flūmine pōns erat (Caesar)
'on that river there was a bridge'

erat ā septentriōnibus collis
'to the north there was a hill."

The use of fuit here would imply that there used to be a bridge, but that it has now gone.

The perfect must also be used with adverbs such as semel 'once', bis 'twice', ter 'three times', which imply that the situation is now over:

fuī bis in Bīthȳniā (Cicero)
'I have been in Bithynia twice'

The perfect is also used for something which has always been (or never been) the case:

numquam hostēs, semper sociī fuimus (Livy)
'we have never been enemies, always allies'

The adverb saepe, when referring to a past period of time, can have either tense:

saepe exercitibus praefuit (Nepos)
'on several occasions he was in charge of armies'

saepe tuī iūdex, saepe magister eram (Ovid)
'often I was your judge, often your teacher'

There are also some types of sentences where either tense may be used indifferently, for example when describing someone's name or character:

Manus eī nōmen erat / Dīnomenī fuit nōmen (Livy)
'his name was Manus' / 'his name was Dinomenes'

dīligēns erat imperātor / imperātor fuit summus (Nepos)
'he was a hard-working general' / 'he was an excellent general'

The equivalent of these two tenses, Spanish era and fui both meaning 'I was', still exist in Spanish and Portuguese today. (See Spanish conjugation, Portuguese verb conjugation.)

=== Eram vs fuī as passive auxiliary ===
According to de Melo it is not always possible to tell from the context whether the tense with fuī refers to an anterior time or is merely a stylistic variation of an ordinary perfect passive. He contrasts the following two sentences, the first of which is made with sum and refers to a very recent time; the second is made with fuī and may refer to a time earlier than the following verb but this is not certain (the speaker goes on to say that after sailing to Egypt he sailed round the most distant coasts, ōrās ultimās sum circumvectus):

vectus hūc sum; etiam nunc nauseō (Plautus)
'I came here on a boat; I am still feeling seasick'

in Aegyptum hīnc vectus fuī (Plautus)
'I (originally) sailed from here to Egypt'

In the following examples, both from the same scene, the meaning of the double perfect seems to be the same as an ordinary perfect:

quod fuī iūrātus, fēcī (Plautus)
'what I swore that I would do, I have done'

quod mandāstī, fēcī (Plautus)
'what you ordered, I have done'

Similarly, the following two examples use different tenses, although the context is very similar and the meaning is the same:

est quod domī dīcere paene fuī oblītus (Plautus)
'there's something which I almost forgot to say (earlier) in the house (i.e. before we left the house)'

oblītus intus dūdum tibi sum dīcere (Plautus)
'I forgot to tell you when we were inside just now'

There is a difference, however, since only the sum form can be used in sentences like the following where the verb has a present perfect meaning:

nesciõ ... oblītus sum omnia (Plautus)
'I don't know ... I've forgotten everything'

In some cases, the perfect participle accompanied by fuī is merely adjectival, and does not describe any particular event. Thus in the following example, according to the 19th-century grammarian Madvig, the words clausus fuit do not describe an event but the state in which the temple of Janus was in:

bis deinde post Numae regnum clausus fuit (Livy)
'since Numa's reign the temple of Janus has been in a closed state only twice'

The perfect indicative with fuī is not used by Cicero except in the following example, where the participles are adjectival. It refers to a previous situation which has now changed:

omnia ferē, quae sunt conclūsa nunc artibus, dispersa et dissipāta quondam fuērunt (Cicero)
'almost all the things which have now been included in the Arts were once dispersed and scattered'

Often, especially from the Augustan period onwards, this tense had no particular anterior meaning but was a mere variation of the perfect passive with sum. De Melo cites the following example, where the second verb is obviously not anterior to the first:

pictūrae excīsae inclūsae sunt in ligneīs fōrmīs et in comitium ... fuērunt allātae (Vitruvius)
'the pictures having been cut out were packed in wooden crates and were brought into the comitium'

In the Vulgate Bible (4th century A.D.), just as with Cicero, the perfect indicative with fuī is only very rarely used compared with the other double tenses. An example is the following:

neque ausus fuit quisquam ex illā diē eum amplius interrogāre
'and after that day no one dared to ask him any questions any more'

== Tense/Mode options ==
Here are some examples of Latin verbs with modal meaning (frequency, possibility, volition, obligation, atemporality) or verb forms determined by conjunctions.

Modal meanings of "present indicative" verbs
Meaning	Form name	Latin example	English translation
present possibility	"present indicative"	tū fortasse vērum dīcis (Cicero)	perhaps you are telling the truth
present frequency	"present indicative"	haec egō patior cōtidie (Cicero)	I suffer these things every day
atemporal fact	"present indicative"	sōlēs occidere et redīre possunt (Catullus)	suns can set and return again
performative event	"present indicative"	veniō nunc ad Dorylēnsium testimōnium (Cicero)	and so I come to the testimony of the Dorylensians (I reach the target topic)
tenseless with dum (while)	"present indicative"	dumque fugit, tergō vēlāmina lāpsa relīquit (Ovid)	while she was fleeing, her cloak (vēlāmina) slipped from her back (tergō) and she left it behind

The imperfect indicative generally has an imperfective meaning and describes situations in the past. Often the imperfect can be translated into English as "was doing", but sometimes the simple tense "did" or expressions such as "used to do", "would do", "kept doing", "began to do", "had been doing" are more appropriate.

Meanings of 'imperfect indicative' verbs
Meaning	Form Name	Latin example	English translation	Comment
incipient past habit	"imperfect indicative"	quō postquam fuga inclīnāvit, aliī in aquam caecī ruēbant, aliī dum cunctantur in rīpīs oppressī (Livy)	after the rout began, some began rushing blindly into the water, others, while they were hesitating on the banks, were crushed	often translated by "began" in English
incipient past habit	"imperfect indicative"	ubī accēpit hominēs clārōs vēnisse, metū agitābātur (Sallust)	when he heard that some important people had come, he began to agitated with alarm	
incipient past habit	"imperfect indicative"	Caesar, cum in Asiam vēnisset, reperiēbat T. Ampium cōnātum esse pecūnias tollere Ephesō ex fānō Diānae (Caesar)	after Caesar arrived in Asia, he began hearing reports that Titus Ampius had been trying to steal money from the temple of Diana in Ephesus	
past habit	"imperfect indicative"	multum enim illum audiēbam (Cicero)	I used to listen to him a lot	
past habit	"perfect indicative"	dīcēbat melius quam scrīpsit Hortēnsius (Cicero)	'Hortensius spoke better than he wrote'	In comparisons, a "perfect" verb is used instead of an "imperfect" one for the standard habit.
iterative past events	"imperfect indicative"	complurīs lēgātiōnēs Pharnacēs ad Domitium mittit ... Domitius respondēbat ... ([Caesar])	Pharnaces sent several embassies to Domitius ... (each time) Domitius would reply ...	what "would happen" after every event of a given type
past state	"imperfect indicative"	mōns altissimus impendēbat (Caesar)	'a very high mountain hung over (the road)'	abstract movement to describe shape
failed action attempt	"imperfect indicative"	Cūriam relinquēbat (Tacitus)	he was leaving the Senate house	represented action never took place
failed action attempt	'imperfect indicative'	in amplexūs occurrentis fīliae ruēbat, nisi interiectī lictōrēs utrīsque obstitissent (Tacitus)	he would have rushed into the embrace of his daughter, who was running towards him, if the bodyguards hadn't intervened and stood in the way of both of them	represented action never took place
failed action attempt	"imperfect indicative"	quārtādecimānī postquam Alpibus dēgressi sunt, sēditiōsissimus quisque signa Viennam ferēbant: cōnsēnsū meliōrum conpressī et legio in Britanniam trānsvecta (Tacitus)	after the soldiers of the 14th legion descended from the Alps, all the more rebellious men were for carrying the standards to Vienne; but they were checked by the consensus of the better men and the legion was transported across to Britain	represented action never took place
longstanding habit	"imperfect indicative"	quod iam diū cupiēbant (Livy)	which they had been desiring for a long time now	often with adverb iam 'by now'
longstanding habit	"imperfect indicative"	iam complūrēs annōs possessionem Siciliae tenēbant (Nepos)	(the Carthaginians) had been in possession of Sicily for several years by this time	often with adverb iam 'by now'
longstanding habit	"imperfect indicative"	Philippus nūllus ūsquam nec nūntius ab eō per aliquot hōras veniēbat (Livy)	Philip was nowhere in sight, and for several hours no messenger had arrived from him	
longstanding habit	"imperfect indicative"	sine coniuge caelebs vīvēbat thalamīque diū cōnsorte carēbat (Ovid)	he was living alone without a wife and for a long time he had lacked any partner in his bedroom	
present event in writing, past in reading,	"imperfect indicative"	etenim ibī sedēns haec ad te scrībēbam (Cicero)	as a matter of fact I wrote this to you while sitting in the same place (where you are reading it)	
present event in writing, past in reading,	"imperfect indicative"	in prōvinciā meā fore mē putābam Kal. Sextīlibus (Cicero)	(As I wrote this letter) I thought I would be in my province by the 1st Sextilis (= August)	
present event in writing, past in reading,	"imperfect indicative"	tuās iam litterās Brūtus exspectābat (Cicero)	(As I wrote this letter) Brutus was expecting a letter from you	
past event in writing, past in past in reading	"pluperfect indicative"	nōndum erat audītum tē ad Italiam adventāre cum Sex. Villium ... cum hīs ad tē litterīs mīsī (Cicero)	'there was still no news of your coming to Italy when I sent Sextus Villius with this letter for you'	
potential state	"imperfect indicative"	omnīnō supervacua erat doctrīna, sī nātūra sufficeret (Quintilian)	teaching would be completely superfluous, if nature was sufficient	"imperfect" of sum
potential state	"imperfect indicative"	vehementer intererat vestrā, quī patrēs estis, līberōs vestrōs hīc potissimum discere (Pliny)	it would be very much in your interest, those of you who are fathers, if your sons could study here rather (than in another town)	"imperfect" of sum

=== "Perfect indicative" usage ===
The perfect passive is usually made with the perfect participle combined with sum, e.g. missus sum 'I was sent, I have been sent', ductus sum 'I was led, I have been led'.

Some perfect tenses have an irregular stem, for example sum, fuī 'I am', eō, īvī 'I go', ferō, tulī 'I bring, I bear', tollō, sustulī 'I raise, I remove'.

The Latin perfect has a dual meaning. It can describe a past event with a present result (e.g. "he has died (and is laying dead somewhere)") or a past event without a present result (e.g. "he died (last year)").

The perfect of cōnsuēscō, cōnsuēvī 'I have grown accustomed', is also often used with a present meaning:

quī diēs aestūs maximōs efficere cōnsuēvit (Caesar)
'this day generally makes the highest tides'

==== Experiential perfect ====
As with the English perfect, the Latin perfect can sometimes be used to relate experiences which have happened several times in the past:

cōntiōnēs saepe exclāmāre vīdī, cum aptē verba cecidissent (Cicero)
'I have often seen public meetings shout out loud when the words fell aptly (i.e. with a striking rhythm)'

ego Appium, ut saepe tēcum locūtus sum, valdē dīligō (Cicero)
'as I've often told you, I am very fond of Appius'

It can also be used with semper to describe what has always been the case:

mē semper amāstī (Cicero)
'you have always loved me'

mēcum vīvit semperque vīxit (Cicero)
'he lives with me, and has always done so'

==== Gnomic perfect ====
Similar to this is the "gnomic perfect", which states a general truth based on past experience:

nōn aeris acervus et aurī dēdūxit corpore febrīs (Horace)
'a heap of bronze and gold has never taken away fevers from the body' (i.e. doesn't take away)

nēmō repentē fuit turpissimus (Juvenal)
'no one has ever become totally shameless suddenly'

==== Iterative action in a temporal or relative clause ====
In sentences which mean "whenever X occurs, Y occurs", referring to general time, the perfect tense is used for event X if it precedes event Y. In English the present tense is often used:

dum legō, adsentior, cum posuī librum adsēnsiō omnis illa ēlābitur (Cicero)
'while I am reading, I agree, but as soon as I have put the book down all that agreement slips away'

cum hūc vēnī, hoc ipsum nihil agere dēlectat (Cicero)
'whenever I come here, this very "doing nothing" delights me'

==== In a past-time temporal clause ====
The perfect tense is usually used in temporal clauses after postquam 'after', ubi 'when', ut 'as soon as', simulac 'as soon as'. Here English often uses the pluperfect tense:

haec ubi dīxit, ... signa canere iubet (Sallust)
'after he (had) said this, he ordered the signal to be sounded'

It is also used in a past-time relative clause referring to an anterior action where similarly English might use a pluperfect:

exercitum quem accēpit āmīsit (Cicero)
'he lost the army which he had received'

==== Length of time ====
The perfect, not the imperfect, is used when a situation is said to have lasted in the past for a certain length of time, but is now over. (The imperfect, however, with a length of time, is used for a situation which was still going on at the time referred to; see the examples above.)

nōnāgintā vīxit annōs (Cicero)
'he lived for ninety years'

Cassius tōtā vītā aquam bibit (Seneca)
'Cassius drank water throughout his whole life'

nec diū pāx Albāna mānsit (Livy)
'but the peace with Alba did not last long'

omnēs ante vōs cōnsulēs senātuī pāruērunt (Cicero)
'all the Consuls before you obeyed the Senate'

However, the phrase iam diū with the perfect tense means 'long ago':

audīvimus hoc iam diū, iūdicēs: negō quemquam esse vestrum quīn saepe audierit (Cicero)
'I heard this long ago, judges; I am sure there is none of you who hasn't often heard it'

scelus, inquam, factum est iam diū, antīquom et vetus (Plautus)
'the crime, I say, was committed long ago; it is old and ancient'

=== "Pluperfect indicative" usage ===
==== Iterative use in temporal clauses ====
In subordinate clauses of the type "whenever...", "whoever..." etc. in past time the pluperfect indicative is used if the event precedes the event of the main clause. Usually in English the simple past is used:

cum rosam vīderat tum incipere vēr arbitrābātur (Cicero)
'it was only whenever he saw a rose that he thought that spring was beginning'

cōnfectō itinere cum ad aliquod oppidum vēnerat, eādem lectīcā ūsque in cubiculum dēferēbātur (Cicero)
'at the end of the journey, whenever he came to some town, he would be carried in the same litter straight into his bedroom'

In later writers such as Livy, the pluperfect subjunctive is used in a similar context.

==== Potential meaning ("would have") ====
Sometimes in a conditional clause a pluperfect indicative can have the meaning of a potential pluperfect subjunctive ("would have"), when it refers to an event which very nearly took place, but did not:

perāctum erat bellum, sī Pompeium Brundisiī opprimere potuisset (Florus)
'the war would have been completely finished, if (Caesar) had been able to crush Pompey at Brundisium'

=== "Periphrastic future" usage ===
==== "Imperfect" auxiliary ====
In a conditional sentence this tense can mean "would have done":

ēmendātūrus, sī licuisset, eram (Ovid)
'I was going to remove the faults (i.e. I would have removed them), if I had been free to do it'

==== "Perfect indicative" auxiliary ====
This tense can also be potential, expressing the meaning "would have done":

sī tibī nōn pāruissem, iūre datūrus fuī poenās (Curtius)
'if I had not obeyed you, I would rightly have paid the penalty'

==== "Pluperfect indicative" auxiliary ====
An example of this tense is the following:

quem senātus dictātōrem dīcī iussūrus fuerat (Livy)
'... whom the Senate had been intending to order should be declared dictator'

==== "Present subjunctive" auxiliary ====
In indirect statements and questions, the active periphrastic future can represent a future or periphrastic future tense of direct speech in primary sequence. In this case there is not necessarily any idea of planning or intention, although there may be:

tē ubī vīsūrus sim, nesciō (Cicero)
'I don't know when I'm going to see you'

quid agātis et ecquid in Italiam ventūrī sītis hāc hieme, fac plānē sciam (Cicero)
'let me know in detail what you are doing and whether at all you'll be coming to Italy this winter'

This tense can also be used in primary sequence reported speech, to represent the main clause in either an ideal conditional sentence or a simple future one (the distinction between these two disappears in indirect speech):

quem adhūc nōs quidem vīdimus nēminem; sed philosophōrum sententiīs, quālis hic futūrus sit, sī modō aliquandō fuerit, expōnitur (Cicero)
'we ourselves have never seen such a (perfectly wise) man; but it is explained in the opinions of philosophers what such a person would be like, if one were ever to exist'

==== "Imperfect subjunctive" auxiliary ====
If the main verb is in past time, an imperfect version of the periphrastic future subjunctive is used:

dubitābam tū hās ipsās litterās essēsne acceptūrus (Cicero)
'I wasn't sure whether you were going to receive this letter'

It is also possible to form an imperfect periphrastic subjunctive with foret instead of esset (the first instance of this is in Sallust):

dīcit sē vēnisse quaesītum ab eō, pācem an bellum agitātūrus foret (Sallust)
'he said that he had come to ask him whether he was intending to make peace or war'

==== "Perfect subjunctive" auxiliary ====
A perfect periphrastic subjunctive can be used with a conditional meaning ("would have done") in hypothetical conditional clauses in indirect questions in primary sequence. In this case it represents a pluperfect subjunctive in the original direct speech:

dīc agedum, Appī Claudī, quidnam factūrus fuerīs, sī eō tempore cēnsor fuissēs? (Livy)
'tell us, Appius Claudius, what you would have done, if you had been censor at that time?'

an potest quisquam dubitāre quīn, sī Q. Ligārius in Italiā esse potuisset, in eādem sententiā futūrus fuerit in quā frātrēs fuērunt? (Cicero)
'can anyone doubt that if Quintus Ligarius had been able to be in Italy, he would have been of the same opinion as his brothers were?'

In an indirect question, the perfect periphrastic subjunctive can also sometimes reflect a potential imperfect subjunctive:

cōgitā quantum additūrus celeritātī fuerīs, sī ā tergō hostis īnstāret (Seneca)
'imagine how much speed you would be putting on, if an enemy were threatening you from behind!'

These tenses can be compared with the similar examples with the perfect periphrastic infinitive cited below, where a conditional sentence made in imperfect subjunctives is converted to an indirect statement.

==== "Pluperfect subjunctive" auxiliary ====
The pluperfect version of the periphrastic subjunctive can be used in a circumstantial cum clause:

cum dē rē pūblicā relātūrus fuisset, adlātō nūntiō dē legiōne quārtā mente concidit (Cicero)
'when Antony had been about to bring some motion about the republic, a message suddenly arrived about the 4th legion and he lost his composure'

It can also be used in conditional sentences after sī, as in the following sentence from an imaginary letter from Helen to Paris:

hīs ego blanditiīs, sī peccātūra fuissem, flecterer (Ovid)
'by flatteries such as these, if I had been going to sin, I might have been persuaded'

Once in Cicero it occurs in the apodosis of an unreal conditional, referring to the inevitability of fate:

etiamsī obtemperāsset auspiciīs, idem ēventūrum fuisset; mūtārī enim fāta non possunt (Cicero)
'even if he had obeyed the auspices, the same thing would have been destined to happen; for the fates cannot be changed'

It can also reflect a potential pluperfect subjunctive ('would have done') in historic sequence in an indirect question:

subībat cōgitātiō animum quōnam modō tolerābilis futūra Etrūria fuisset, sī quid in Samniō adversī ēvēnisset (Livy)
'it occurred to them how impossible Etruria would have been, if anything had gone wrong in Samnium'

=== Historic infinitive ===
The present infinitive is occasionally used in narrative as a tense in its own right. It usually describes a scene in which the same action was being done repeatedly. There are often two or more historic infinitives in succession. When the subject is expressed, it is in the nominative case (distinguishing the historic infinitive from the accusative and infinitive of reported speech).

tum spectāculum horribile in campīs patentibus: sequī, fugere, occīdī, capī (Sallust)
'then there was a ghastly spectacle on the open plains: people kept chasing, fleeing, being killed, being captured'

clāmāre ille, cum raperētur, nihil sē miserum fēcisse (Cicero)
'the poor man kept shouting, as he was being dragged away, that he had done nothing'

iste tum petere ab illīs, tum minārī, tum spem, tum metum ostendere (Cicero)
'he by turns kept begging them, then threatening, now offering hope, now fear'

=== "Could have done" ===
The perfect tense potuī with the infinitive can often mean 'I was able to' or 'I managed to':

Scīpio P. Rupilium potuit cōnsulem efficere, frātrem eius Lūcium nōn potuit (Cicero)
'Scipio managed to make Publius Rupilius Consul, but he wasn't able to do the same for Rupilius's brother Lucius'

However, it can also mean 'I could have done (but did not)':

quī fuī et quī esse potuī iam esse nōn possum (Cicero)
'what I was and what I could have been, I can now no longer be'

Antōnī gladiōs potuit contemnere, sī sīc omnia dīxisset (Juvenal)
'(Cicero) could have despised Antony's swords (i.e. would have had no reason to fear them), if he had spoken everything in this way!'

quaeris quid potuerit amplius adsequī Plancius, sī Cn. Scīpionis fuisset fīlius (Cicero)
'you ask what more Plancius could have achieved, if he had been the son of Gnaeus Scipio'

The pluperfect subjunctive after cum also means 'could have':

Aemilius, cum ... ēdūcere in aciem potuisset, intrā vallum suōs tenuit (Livy)
'although he could have led them out into battle, Aemilius held his troops inside the wall of the camp'

=== "Ought to have done" ===
"Ought to have done" is often expressed with a past tense of dēbeō 'I have a duty to' or oportet 'it is fitting' together with a present infinitive:

in senātum venīre illō diē nōn dēbuistī (Cicero)
'you ought not to have come to the Senate on that day'

ad mortem tē, Catilīna, dūcī iussū cōnsulis iam prīdem oportēbat (Cicero)
'you ought to have been put to death long ago by order of the Consul, Catiline!'

Sometimes, oportēbat means 'it must be the case that...':

sī multus erat in calceīs pulvis, ex itinere eum venīre oportēbat (Cicero)
'if there was a lot of dust on his shoes, he must have been coming from a journey'

Sometimes, in familiar style, oportuit can be used with the perfect infinitive passive:

(hoc) iam prīdem factum esse oportuit (Cicero)
'this ought to have been done long ago'

The indirect speech form is regularly oportuisse with the present infinitive:

domum negant oportuisse mē aedificāre (Cicero)
'they say I ought not to have built the house'

=== Indirect commands with the infinitive ===
Indirect commands are made with two constructions: either ut (or nē) with the present or imperfect subjunctive, or the accusative and infinitive construction, using the present infinitive. The latter construction is used especially when the main verb is iubeō 'I order' or vetō 'I forbid', but also sometimes after imperō 'I command':

signum darī iubet (Caesar)
'he ordered the signal to be given'

quis tyrannus miserōs lūgēre vetuit? (Cicero)
'what tyrant has ever forbidden unhappy people to mourn?'
