= Present tense =

Grammatical tense

The present tense (abbreviated PRES or PRS) is a grammatical tense whose principal function is to locate a situation or event in the present time. The present tense is used for actions which are happening now. In order to explain and understand present tense, it is useful to imagine time as a line on which the past tense, the present and the future tense are positioned. The term present tense is usually used in descriptions of specific languages to refer to a particular grammatical form or set of forms; these may have a variety of uses, not all of which will necessarily refer to present time. For example, in the English sentence "My train leaves tomorrow morning", the verb form leaves is said to be in the present tense, even though in this particular context it refers to an event in future time. Similarly, in the historical present, the present tense is used to narrate events that occurred in the past.

There are two common types of present tense form in most Indo-European languages: the present indicative (the combination of present tense and indicative mood) and the present subjunctive (the combination of present tense and subjunctive mood). In English, the present tense is mainly classified into four parts or subtenses.

1. Simple present: The simple present tense is used to talk about states (knowledge, understanding, etc.), or to focus on the frequency of events or actions (e.g. They never bathe.).
2. Present perfect: The present perfect tense is utilized for events or states that began in the past and which continue to the moment of speaking. It is often used to express results.
3. Present continuous: The present continuous tense is used to describe an action or event which is not yet completed.
4. Present perfect continuous: The present perfect continuous tense is used for actions or events that began in the past and continue (or recur) up to the present.

== Use ==
The present indicative of most verbs in modern English has the same form as the infinitive, except for the third-person singular form, which takes the ending -[e]s. The verb be has the forms am, is, are. For details, see English verbs. For the present subjunctive, see English subjunctive.

A number of multi-word constructions exist to express the combinations of present tense with the basic form of the present tense is called the simple present; there are also constructions known as the present progressive (or present continuous) (e.g. am writing), the present perfect (e.g. have written), and the present perfect progressive (e.g. have been writing).

Use of the present tense does not always imply the present time. In particular, the present tense is often used to refer to future events (I am seeing James tomorrow; My train leaves at 3 o'clock this afternoon). This is particularly the case in condition clauses and many other adverbial subordinate clauses: If you see him,...; As soon as they arrive... There is also the historical present, in which the present tense is used to narrate past events.

For details of the uses of present tense constructions in English, see Uses of English verb forms.

== Hellenic languages ==
=== Modern Greek present indicative tense ===
In Modern Greek, the present tense is used in a similar way to the present tense in English and can represent the present continuous as well. As with some other conjugations in Greek, some verbs in the present tense accept different (but equivalent) forms of use for the same person. What follows are examples of present tense conjugation in Greek for the verbs βλέπω (see), τρώω (eat) and αγαπώ (love).

	βλέπω	τρώω, τρώγω	αγαπώ, αγαπάω
εγώ I	βλέπω	τρώω, τρώγω	αγαπώ, αγαπάω
εσύ thou	βλέπεις	τρως, τρώεις	αγαπάς
αυτός/αυτή/αυτό he/she/it	βλέπει	τρώει, τρώγει	αγαπά(ει)
εμείς we	βλέπουμε	τρώμε, τρώγομε, τρώγουμε	αγαπάμε, αγαπούμε
εσείς you (pl.)	βλέπετε	τρώτε, τρώγετε	αγαπάτε
αυτοί/αυτές/αυτά they	βλέπουν(ε)	τρών(ε), τρώγουν(ε)	αγαπούν(ε), αγαπάν(ε)

== Romance languages ==
The Romance languages are derived from Latin, and in particular western Vulgar Latin. As a result, their usages and forms are similar.

=== Latin present indicative tense ===
The Latin present tense can be translated as progressive or simple present. Here are examples of the present indicative tense conjugation in Latin.

	plicāre	debēre	dicere	cupere	scīre
conjugation	1st	2nd	3rd	3rd	4th
ego	plicō	debeō	dīcō	cupiō	sciō
tu	plicās	debēs	dīcis	cupis	scīs
is, ea, id	plicat	debet	dicit	cupit	scit
nos	plicāmus	debēmus	dīcimus	cupimus	scīmus
vos	plicātis	debētis	dīcitis	cupitis	scītis
ei, eae, ea	plicant	debent	dīcunt	cupiunt	sciunt

=== French present indicative tense ===
In French, the present tense is used similarly to that of English. Below is an example of present tense conjugation in French.

	parler	perdre	finir	partir
je	parle	perds	finis	pars
tu	parles	perds	finis	pars
il/elle/on	parle	perd	finit	part
nous	parlons	perdons	finissons	partons
vous	parlez	perdez	finissez	partez
ils/elles	parlent	perdent	finissent	partent

The present indicative is commonly used to express the present continuous. For example, Jean mange may be translated as John eats, John is eating. To emphasise the present continuous, expressions such as "en train de" may be used. For example, Jean est en train de manger may be translated as John is eating, John is in the middle of eating. On est en train de chercher un nouvel appartement may be translated as We are looking for a new apartment, We are in the process of finding a new apartment.

=== Italian present indicative tense ===
In Italian, the present tense is used similarly to that of English. What follows is an example of present indicative tense conjugation in Italian.

	parlare	vedere	sentire
io	parlo	vedo	sento
tu	parli	vedi	senti
egli/ella	parla	vede	sente
noi	parliamo	vediamo	sentiamo
voi	parlate	vedete	sentite
essi/esse	parlano	vedono	sentono

=== Portuguese and Spanish present indicative tense ===
The present tenses of Portuguese and Spanish are similar in form, and are used in similar ways. What follows are examples of the present indicative conjugation in Portuguese.

Pronoun	falar	comer	insistir	ter	ser
eu	falo	como	insisto	tenho	sou
tu	falas	comes	insistes	tens	és
ele/ela/você	fala	come	insiste	tem	é
nós	falamos	comemos	insistimos	temos	somos
vós	falais	comeis	insistis	tendes	sois
eles/elas/vocês	falam	comem	insistem	têm	são

There follow examples of the corresponding conjugation in Spanish.

Pronoun	hablar	comer	insistir	tener	ser
yo	hablo	como	insisto	tengo	soy
tú	hablas	comes	insistes	tienes	eres
él/ella/usted	habla	come	insiste	tiene	es
nosotros	hablamos	comemos	insistimos	tenemos	somos
vosotros	habláis	coméis	insistís	tenéis	sois
ellos/ellas/ustedes	hablan	comen	insisten	tienen	son

== Slavic languages ==
=== Bulgarian present indicative tense ===
In Bulgarian, the present indicative tense of imperfective verbs is used in a very similar way to the present indicative in English. It can also be used as present progressive. Below is an example of present indicative tense conjugation in Bulgarian.

	писати* pisati	говорити* govoriti	искати* iskati	отваряти* otvarjati
аз az	пиша piša	говоря govorja	искам iskam	отварям otvarjam
ти ti	пишеш pišeš	говориш govoriš	искаш iskaš	отваряш otvarjaš
той, тя, то toj, tja, to	пише piše	говори govori	иска iska	отваря otvarja
ние nie	пишем pišem	говорим govorim	искаме iskame	отваряме otvarjame
вие vie	пишете pišete	говорите govorite	искате iskate	отваряте otvarjate
те te	пишат pišat	говорят govorjat	искат iskat	отварят otvarjat

*Archaic, no infinitive in the modern language.

=== Macedonian present tense ===
The present tense in Macedonian is expressed using imperfective verbs. The following table shows the conjugation of the verbs write (пишува/pišuva), speak (зборува/zboruva), want (сака/saka) and open (отвaра/otvara).

	пишува pišuva write	зборува zboruva speak	сака saka want	отвaрa otvara open
јас jas 1SG	пишувам pišuvam	зборувам zboruvam	сакам sakam	отвaрам otvaram
ти ti 2SG	пишуваш pišuvaš	зборуваш zboruvaš	сакаш sakaš	отвaраш otvaraš
тој, таа, тоа toj, taa, toa 3SG.M 3SG.F 3SG.N	пишува pišuva	зборува zboruva	сака saka	отвaра otvara
ние nie 1PL	пишуваме pišuvame	зборуваме zboruvame	сакаме sakame	отвaраме otvarame
вие vie 2PL	пишувате pišuvate	зборувате zboruvate	сакате sakate	отвaрате otvarate
тие tie 3PL	пишуваат pišuvaat	зборуваат zboruvaat	сакаат sakaat	отвaраат otvaraat

== Sinitic languages ==
In Wu Chinese, unlike other Sinitic languages (Varieties of Chinese), some tenses can be marked, including the present tense. For instance, in Suzhounese and Old Shanghainese, the word 哉 is used. The particle is placed at the end of a clause, and when a tense is referenced, the word order switches to SOV.

In a sentence such as "落雨了", it would be the perfective aspect in Standard Mandarin, whereas this would be analysed as the present tense in contemporary Shanghainese, where 哉 has undergone lenition to 了.

== See also ==
- Grammatical aspect
- Tense–aspect–mood
- Tense confusion
