= Passé composé =

Common past tense in French

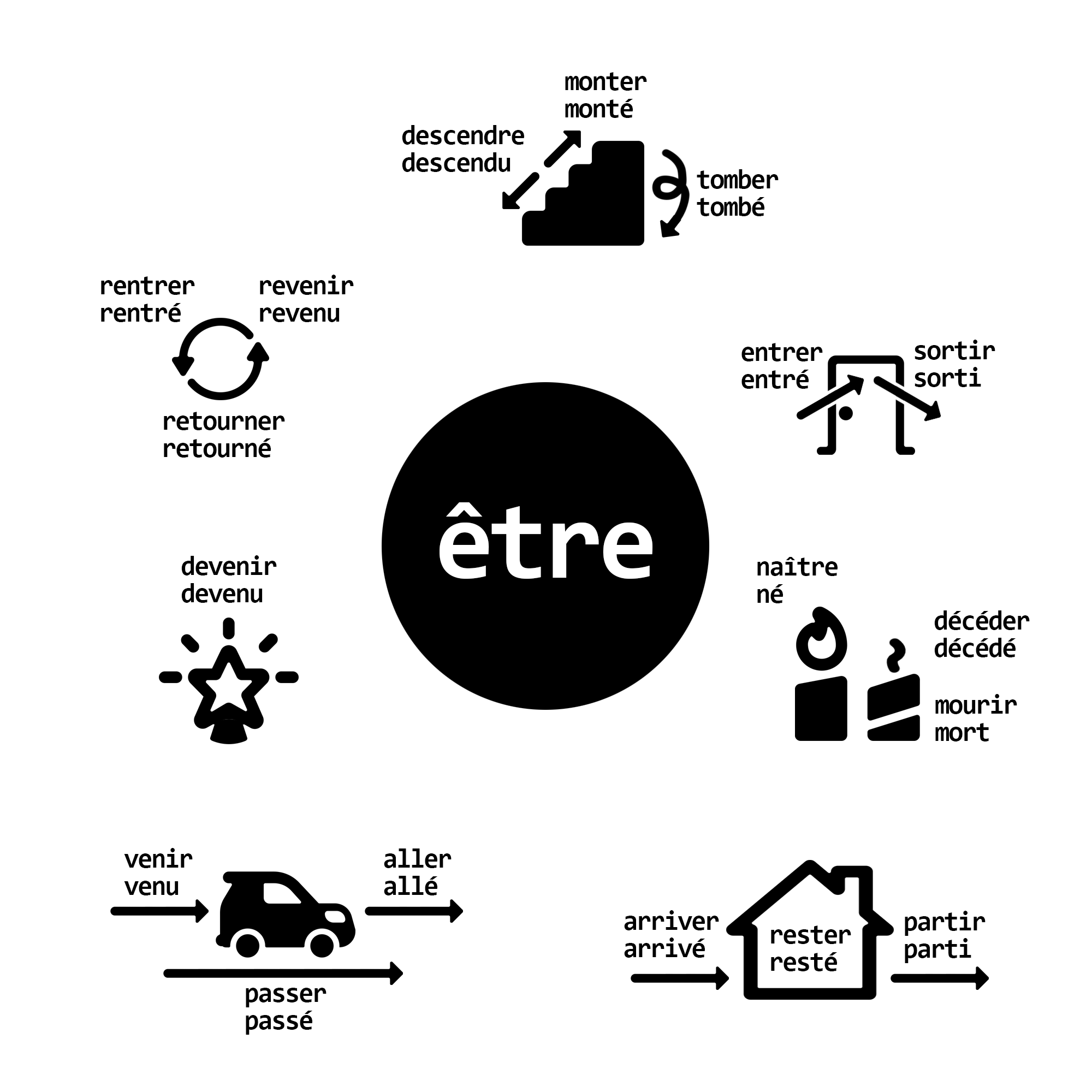
Diagram showing which verbs (apart from pronominal verbs) are conjugated with être; below each verb in infinitive form is the past participle.

The passé composé (pronounced [pase kɔ̃poze]; 'compound past') is a past tense in the French language. It is used to express an action that has been finished completely or incompletely at the time of speech, or at some (possibly unknown) time in the past. It originally corresponded in function to the English present perfect, but now there is a tendency to use it for all completed actions in the past as the equivalent of the simple past. Its current usage corresponds fairly closely to that of the Latin perfect tense. It is formed using an auxiliary verb and the past participle of a verb.

In British teaching of French, the passé composé is usually known as the perfect tense.

== Conjugation ==
The passé composé is formed by the auxiliary verb, usually the avoir auxiliary, followed by the past participle. The construction is parallel to that of the present perfect (there is no difference in French between perfect and non-perfect forms - although there is an important difference in usage between the perfect tense and the imperfect tense).

The passé composé is usually translated into English as a simple past tense, "I saw", or as a present perfect would be, "I have seen". It could also be translated as emphatic past tense, "I did see".

- J'ai vu quelque chose (I saw something / I have seen something)
- Tu as parlé de quelque chose (You spoke of something / you have spoken of something)
- Le garçon est sorti (The boy has gone out / the boy went out / the boy is out)

The auxiliary may actually be used similarly in any tense, leading to the French compound tenses.

=== Auxiliary avoir ===
The auxiliary verb is typically avoir 'to have', but is sometimes être 'to be' (see below).

This is the conjugation of avoir, with a past participle:

- j’ai vu (I saw)
- nous avons vu (we saw)
- tu as vu (you saw)
- vous avez vu (you saw)
- il/elle/on a vu (he/she/one saw)
- ils/elles ont vu (they (m)/they (f) saw)

=== Auxiliary être ===
The verbs that use être as an auxiliary verb are intransitive verbs that usually indicate motion or change of state.

Since some of these verbs can be used as a transitive verb as well, they will instead take avoir as an auxiliary in those instances. For example:

- Il est sorti (he went out / he has gone out / he is out)
- Il a sorti un outil pour le réparer (he took out a tool to repair it [something else])

Sortir, monter, descendre, entrer, retourner, and passer all have transitive and intransitive uses.

This is the conjugation of être, with a past participle:

- je suis mort(e) (I died, I am dead)
- nous sommes mort(e)s (we died, we are dead)
- tu es mort(e) (you died, you are dead)
- vous êtes mort(e)s (you died, you are dead)
- il/elle/on est mort(e) (he/she/one/it died, he/she/it is dead)
- ils/elles sont mort(e)s (they died, they are dead)

The following is a list of verbs that use être (for intransitive usage) as their auxiliary verbs in passé composé:

- Devenir – to become – (être) devenu(e)(s)
- Revenir – to come back – (être) revenu(e)(s)
- Monter – to go up – (être) monté(e)(s)
- Rester – to stay – (être) resté(e)(s)
- Sortir – to exit – (être) sorti(e)(s)
- Venir – to come – (être) venu(e)(s)
- Aller – to go – (être) allé(e)(s)
- Naître – to be born – (être) né(e)(s)
- Descendre – to descend – (être) descendu(e)(s)
- Entrer – to enter – (être) entré(e)(s)
- Retourner – to return – (être) retourné(e)(s)
- Tomber – to fall – (être) tombé(e)(s)
- Rentrer – to re-enter – (être) rentré(e)(s)
- Arriver – to arrive – (être) arrivé(e)(s)
- Mourir – to die – (être) mort(e)(s)
- Partir – to leave – (être) parti(e)(s)

The above have been remembered using the mnemonic acronym DR and MRS VANDERTRAMP. (Other teaching methods have been used. An alternative version of the mnemonic acronym adds a final "P" (as ...TRAMPP), to account for "passer" in the following section of "additional" être-conjugated verbs. Language evolution with time poses a challenge for this approach.)

In addition to these, at least two other verbs are conjugated with être:

- Décéder – to die – (être) décédé(e)(s)
- Passer – to spend/pass– (être) passé(e)(s) (although it is only conjugated with être when describing movement)

=== Reflexive forms ===
In addition to the above verbs, all reflexive/pronominal verbs use être as their auxiliary verb. A reflexive/pronominal verb is one that relates back to the speaker, either as an object e.g. Je me suis trompé 'I'm mistaken, I made a mistake' (= *j'ai trompé moi-même, literally 'I fooled myself'), or as a dative form e.g. Je me suis donné du temps (= *j'ai donné du temps à moi-même, 'I gave myself some time').

== Formation of French past participles ==
To form the past participle for first-group verbs (-ER verbs) and aller too, drop the -er and add -é.

parler (to speak)    - er + é = parlé (spoken)
arriver (to arrive)  - er + é = arrivé (arrived)
manger (to eat)      - er + é = mangé (eaten)

To form the past participle for second-group verbs (-IR verbs with -ISSANT gerund), drop the -ir and add -i.

finir (to finish)    - ir + i = fini (finished)
choisir (to choose)  - ir + i = choisi (chosen)
grandir (to grow up) - ir + i = grandi (grown up)

To form the past participle for third-group verbs (-RE verbs), drop the -re and add -u.

pendre (to hang)     - re + u = pendu (hung or sometimes hanged)
vendre (to sell)     - re + u = vendu (sold)
entendre (to hear)   - re + u = entendu (heard)
attendre (to wait)   - re + u = attendu (waited)

- The irregular past participles (which are often found with the third group verbs) must be memorized separately, of which the following are a few:

acquérir:    acquis      (acquired)
apprendre:   appris      (learnt/learned)
atteindre:   atteint     (attained)
avoir:       eu          (had)
boire:       bu          (drunk/drunken)
comprendre:  compris     (understood)
conduire:    conduit     (driven)
connaître:   connu       (known)
construire:  construit   (constructed)
courir:      couru       (run)
couvrir:     couvert     (covered)
craindre:    craint      (feared)
croire:      cru         (believed)
décevoir:    déçu        (disappointed)
découvrir:   découvert   (discovered)
devoir:      dû          (had to)
dire:        dit         (said)
écrire:      écrit       (written)
être:        été         (been)
faire:       fait        (done)
instruire:   instruit    (prepared)
joindre:     joint       (joined)
lire:        lu          (read)
mettre:      mis         (put, placed)
offrir:      offert      (offered)
ouvrir:      ouvert      (opened)
paraître:    paru        (resembled)
peindre:     peint       (painted)
pouvoir:     pu          (been able to)
prendre:     pris        (taken)
produire:    produit     (produced)
recevoir:    reçu        (received)
rire:        ri          (laughed)
savoir:      su          (known)
souffrir:    souffert    (hurt)
surprendre:  surpris     (surprised)
suivre:      suivi       (followed)
tenir:       tenu        (held, holden)
venir:       venu        (come)
vivre:       vécu        (lived)
voir:        vu          (seen)
vouloir:     voulu       (wanted)

== Agreement between participle and object ==
The use of the past participle in compound tenses in French is complicated by occasional "agreement" with the object of the action. In French, agreement is accomplished by adding an -e to the end of the past participle if the grammatical gender of the subject or direct object in question is feminine and an -s if it is plural. (Note that for verbs of the first and second group, the past participle ends with a vowel, thus the masculine and feminine, singular and plural forms are all pronounced the same. Within the third-group verbs, one can find past participles ending with a mute consonant, such as mis and fait, and those do change pronunciation.)

- The past participle almost always agrees with the subject when the auxiliary verb is être (beware, though, that pronominal verbs may produce tricky cases), or when the past participle is used as an adjective (which is essentially the same case).
- When the auxiliary verb is avoir, the past participle must agree with the direct object if the direct object precedes the past participle in the sentence.

Examples :

- Les hommes sont arrivés. (The men arrived /the men have arrived)
  NB: agreement, s is needed in that case, because of the être auxiliary - the meaning (and construction) is that of a predicative expression in that case.
- Les filles sont venues. (The girls came / the girls have come / the girls have arrived)
  NB: agreement of venues, see above.
- Nous nous sommes levé(e)s. (We got up, rose / we did rise)
  NB : an extra e would be required if nous refers to a group of females - see above.
- J'ai vu la voiture. (I saw the car / I have seen the car / I did see the car)
- Je l'ai vue. (I saw it / I have seen it)
  NB - agreement needed in that case, referring to the car (the object materialized by " l' " is mentioned before the participle - see Accord du participe passé en français for details).
- Les voitures que j'ai vues étaient rouges. (The cars [that I saw / that I've seen] were red)
  que relative to Les voitures, implies that the participle is feminine plural in that case (les voitures sont vues).
- Où sont mes lunettes? Où est-ce que je les ai mises? (Where are my glasses? Where did I put them?)
- Voilà l'erreur que j'ai faite. (There's the mistake [I made/I have made])
  que relative to l'erreur, feminine singular)

For more information, see French verbs, and Agreement rules for the past participle in French.

== See also ==
- French conjugation
- Preterite
- Perfect (grammar)
