= Passé simple =

French past tense

The passé simple (French pronunciation: [pase sɛ̃pl], simple past, preterite, or past historic), also called the passé défini (IPA: [pase defini], definite past), is the literary equivalent of the passé composé in the French language, used predominantly in formal writing (including history and literature) and formal speech. As with other preterites, it is used when the action has a definite beginning and end and has already been completed. In writing it is most often used for narration.

== Constructing the passé simple ==
Even though the passé simple is a common French verb tense, used even in books for very young French children, it is usually not taught to students of French as a second language until advanced French classes. The passé simple is most often formed by dropping the last two letters of the infinitive form of the verb and adding the appropriate ending.

The three main classes of French regular verbs (-er, -ir, -re) are conjugated in the passé simple tense in the following way:

chercher	je cherchai	tu cherchas	il/elle chercha	nous cherchâmes	vous cherchâtes	ils/elles cherchèrent
finir	je finis	tu finis	il/elle finit	nous finîmes	vous finîtes	ils/elles finirent
rendre	je rendis	tu rendis	il/elle rendit	nous rendîmes	vous rendîtes	ils/elles rendirent

Several common irregular verbs:

faire	je fis	tu fis	il/elle fit	nous fîmes	vous fîtes	ils/elles firent
venir	je vins	tu vins	il/elle vint	nous vînmes	vous vîntes	ils/elles vinrent
être	je fus	tu fus	il/elle fut	nous fûmes	vous fûtes	ils/elles furent
avoir	j'eus [ʒy]	tu eus [ty.y]	il/elle eut [i.ly]	nous eûmes [nu.zym]	vous eûtes [vu.zyt]	ils/elles eurent [il.zyʁ]

Many other irregular verbs are easily recognized because the passé simple often resembles the past participle. For example, il courut (he ran) is from courir, for which the past participle is couru. Some, however, are totally irregular. Naitre (to be born) has a past participle né and yet the passé simple is (for example) je naquis (I was born).

== How the passé simple is used ==
The passé simple is used to express:

- an event or action, of long or short duration, that is complete, and over, but not necessarily remote in time:

Le Général de Gaulle vécut 80 ans.

General de Gaulle lived for eighty years.

En 1991, l'équipe de France de tennis gagna la coupe Davis.

In 1991, the French team won the Davis Cup.

- a series of completed events, perceived as points in time:

... l'image fut bonne ... cela parut pour son entourage l'essentiel ... on sentit tout de même ... son épouse lui fit signe de ...
... the impression was good ... that seemed to be the essential thing for his entourage ... they felt nevertheless ... his wife signalled to him to ...

- in combination with and in contrast to the imperfect tense, which describes the background of the event or series of events:

Puis, il tourna le robinet de l'évier, se lava les mains, s'essuya au linge accroché sous le grêle tuyau ... Et elle guettait ses moindres gestes ...
Then he turned on the tap, washed his hands, dried them on the towel hanging under the thin pipe. ... And she watched his slightest movement ...

== Modern usage ==
While literary and refined language still uses the passé simple, the standard ordinary spoken language has renounced passé simple for the passé composé, which means that in spoken French, there is no longer a nuance between:

Passé composé « Je suis arrivé. » ("I have arrived." I have come to town. I may have just arrived.)

and

Passé simple « J'arrivai. » ("I arrived." I came to town, but it is possible that I am not still here.)

== Local usage ==
In modern spoken French, the passé simple has practically disappeared, but localised French has its own variations, like this sample from Langue d'oïl in the North of France where "mangea" is replaced by "mangit":

« Malheureux comme le chien à Brisquet, qui n'allit qu'une fois au bois, et que le loup le mangit. »
Unfortunate like Brisquet's dog, who went into the woods only once and whom the wolf ate.

In Canada, the passé simple continues to be used, at least more than in France.

In modern spoken French, the passé simple is used occasionally as a joke to make the sentence sound either more pretentious or refined, especially in the first or second person plural, which are rarely if ever used in contemporary French, even in writing.
