= Code talker =

Military personnel using their native languages for secret wartime communication

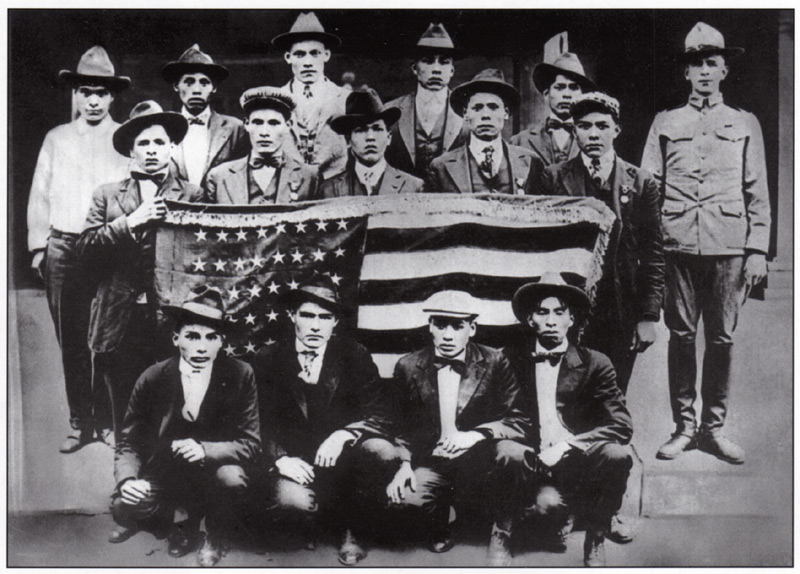
Choctaw soldiers in training in World War I for coded radio and telephone transmissions

A code talker was a person employed by the military during wartime to use a little-known language as a means of secret communication. The term is most often used for United States service members during the World Wars who used their knowledge of Native American languages as a basis to transmit coded messages.

There were approximately 400 to 500 Native Americans in the United States Marine Corps whose primary job was to transmit secret tactical messages. Code talkers transmitted messages over military telephone or radio communications nets using formally or informally developed codes built upon their indigenous languages.

The code talkers improved the speed of encryption and decryption of communications in front line operations during World War II and are credited with some decisive victories. Their code was never broken.

== Methods ==
There were two code types used during World War II.

- Type one codes were formally developed based on the languages of the Comanche, Hopi, Meskwaki, and Navajo peoples. They used words from their languages for each letter of the English alphabet. Messages could be encoded and decoded by using a simple substitution cipher where the ciphertext was the Native language word.
- Type two code was informal and directly translated from English into the Indigenous language. Code talkers used short, descriptive phrases if there was no corresponding word in the Indigenous language for the military word. For example, the Navajo did not have a word for submarine, so they translated it as iron fish.

== Training ==
The term code talker was coined by the United States Marine Corps and used to identify individuals who completed the special training required to qualify as code talkers. Their service records indicated "642 – Code Talker" as a duty assignment. Today, the term code talker is still strongly associated with the bilingual Navajo speakers trained in the Navajo Code during World War II by the US Marine Corps to serve in all six divisions of the Corps and the Marine Raiders of the Pacific theater.

The use of Native American communicators pre-dates World War II. Early pioneers of Native American-based communications used by the US military included the Cherokee, Choctaw, and Lakota peoples during World War I. Today the term code talker includes military personnel from all Native American communities who have contributed their language skills in service to the United States.

== Native languages ==
Other Native American communicators—now referred to as code talkers—were deployed by the United States Army during World War II, including Lakota, Meskwaki, Mohawk, Comanche, Tlingit, Hopi, Cree, and Crow soldiers; they served in the Pacific, North African, and European theaters.

=== Assiniboine ===
Native speakers of the Assiniboine language served as code talkers during World War II to encrypt communications. One of these code talkers was Gilbert Horn Sr., who grew up in the Fort Belknap Indian Reservation of Montana and became a tribal judge and politician.

=== Basque ===
In November 1952, Euzko Deya magazine reported that sometime in May 1942, upon meeting a large number of US Marines of Basque ancestry in a San Francisco camp, Captain Frank D. Carranza had thought of using the Basque language for codes. His superiors were concerned about risk, as there were known settlements of Basque people in the Pacific region, including 35 Basque Jesuits in Hiroshima, led by Pedro Arrupe; a colony of Basque jai alai players in China and the Philippines; and Basque supporters of Falange in Asia. Consequently, the US Basque code talkers were not deployed in these theaters; instead, they were used initially in tests and in transmitting logistics information for Hawaii and Australia.

According to Euzko Deya, on August 1, 1942, Lieutenants Nemesio Aguirre, Fernández Bakaicoa, and Juanana received a Basque-coded message from San Diego for Admiral Chester Nimitz. The message warned Nimitz of Operation Apple to remove the Japanese from the Solomon Islands. They also translated the start date, August 7, for the attack on Guadalcanal. As the war extended over the Pacific, there was a shortage of Basque speakers, and the US military came to prefer the parallel program based on the use of Navajo speakers.

In 2017, Pedro Oiarzabal and Guillermo Tabernilla published a paper refuting Euzko Deya's article. According to Oiarzabal and Tabernilla, they could not find Carranza, Aguirre, Fernández Bakaicoa, or Juanana in the National Archives and Records Administration or US Army archives. They did find a small number of US Marines with Basque surnames, but none of them worked in transmissions. They suggest that Carranza's story was an Office of Strategic Services operation to raise sympathy for US intelligence among Basque nationalists.

=== Cherokee ===
The US military's first known use of code talkers was during World War I. Cherokee soldiers of the US 30th Infantry Division fluent in the Cherokee language were assigned to transmit messages while under fire during the Second Battle of the Somme. According to the Division Signal Officer, this took place in September 1918 when their unit was under British command.

=== Choctaw ===
During World War I, company commander Captain Lawrence of the US Army overheard Solomon Louis and Mitchell Bobb having a conversation in Choctaw. Upon further investigation, he found eight Choctaw men served in the battalion. The Choctaw men in the Army's 36th Infantry Division were trained to use their language in code. They helped the American Expeditionary Forces in several battles of the Meuse-Argonne Offensive. On October 26, 1918, the code talkers were pressed into service and the "tide of battle turned within 24 hours ... and within 72 hours the Allies were on full attack."

=== Comanche ===
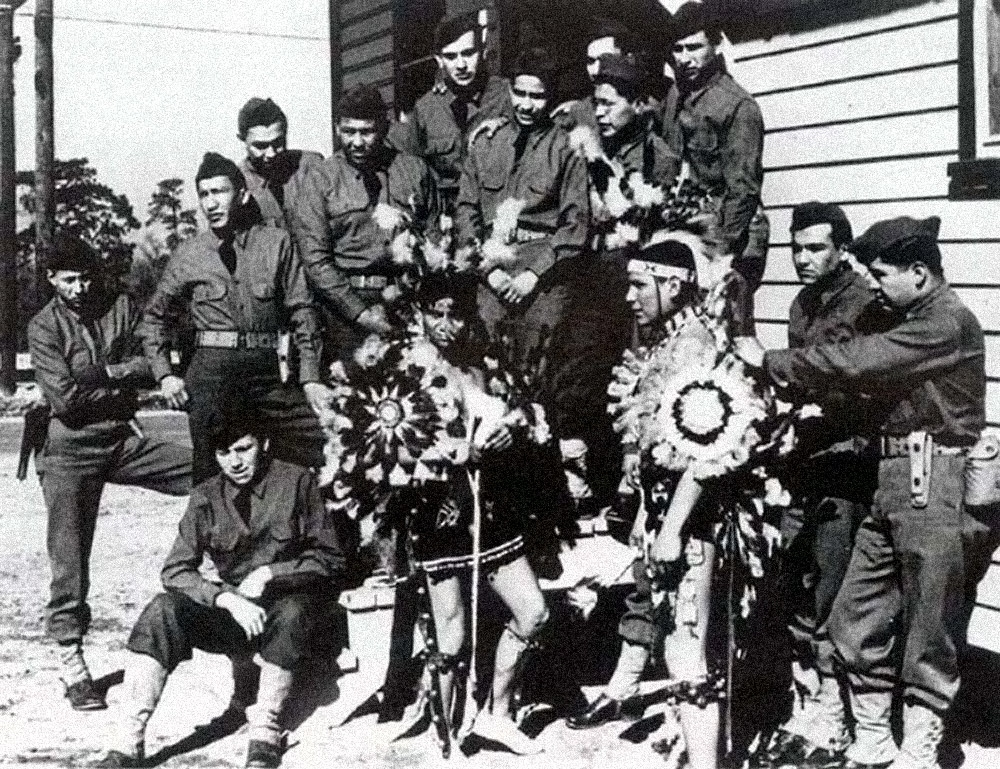
Comanche code talkers of the 4th Signal Company

German authorities knew about the use of code talkers during World War I. Germans sent a team of thirty anthropologists to the United States to learn Native American languages before the outbreak of World War II. However, the task proved too difficult because of the large array of Indigenous languages and dialects. Nonetheless, after learning of the Nazi effort, the US Army opted not to implement a large-scale code talker program in the European theater.

Initially, 17 code talkers were enlisted, but three could not make the trip across the Atlantic until the unit was finally deployed. A total of 14 code talkers using the Comanche language took part in the Invasion of Normandy and served in the 4th Infantry Division in Europe. Comanche soldiers of the 4th Signal Company compiled a vocabulary of 250 code terms using words and phrases in their own language. Using a substitution method similar to that of the Navajo, the code talkers used descriptive words from the Comanche language for things that did not have translations. For example, the Comanche language code term for tank was turtle, bomber was pregnant bird, machine gun was sewing machine, and Adolf Hitler was crazy white man.

Two Comanche code talkers were assigned to each regiment, and the remainder were assigned to the 4th Infantry Division headquarters. The Comanche began transmitting messages shortly after landing on Utah Beach on June 6, 1944. Some were wounded but none killed.

In 1989, the French government awarded the Comanche code talkers the Chevalier of the National Order of Merit. On November 30, 1999, the United States Department of Defense presented Charles Chibitty with the Knowlton Award, in recognition of his outstanding intelligence work.

=== Cree ===
In World War II, the Canadian Armed Forces employed First Nations soldiers who spoke the Cree language as code talkers. Owing to oaths of secrecy and official classification through 1963, the role of Cree code talkers was less well-known than their US counterparts and went unacknowledged by the Canadian government. A 2016 documentary, Cree Code Talkers, tells the story of one such Métis individual, Charles "Checker" Tomkins. Tomkins died in 2003 but was interviewed shortly before his death by the Smithsonian National Museum of the American Indian. While he identified other Cree code talkers, "Tomkins may have been the last of his comrades to know anything of this secret operation."

=== Hungarian ===
In 2022 during the Russo-Ukrainian War, the Hungarian language is reported to be used by the Ukrainian army to relay operational military information and orders to circumvent being understood by the invading Russian army without the need to encrypt and decipher the messages. Ukraine has a sizeable Hungarian population of over 150,000 people who live mainly in the Kárpátalja (in Hungarian) or Zakarpatska Oblast (in Ukrainian) division of Ukraine, adjacent to Hungary. As Ukrainian nationals, men of enlistment age are also subject to military service, hence the Ukrainian army has a Hungarian-speaking capability. It is one of the most spoken and official languages of this region in present-day Ukraine. The Hungarian language is not an Indo-European language like the Slavic Ukrainian or Russian, but a Uralic language. For this reason, it is distinct and incomprehensible for Russian speakers.

=== Meskwaki ===
A group of 27 Meskwaki enlisted in the US Army together in January 1941; they comprised 16 percent of Iowa's Meskwaki population. During World War II, the US Army trained eight Meskwaki men to use their native Fox language as code talkers. They were assigned to North Africa. The eight were posthumously awarded the Congressional Gold Medal in 2013; the government gave the awards to representatives of the Meskwaki community.

=== Mohawk ===
Mohawk language code talkers were used during World War II by the United States Army in the Pacific theater. Levi Oakes, a Mohawk code talker born in Canada, was deployed to protect messages sent by Allied Forces using Kanien'kéha (the Mohawk language). Oakes died in May 2019; he was the last of the Mohawk code talkers.

=== Muscogee (Seminole and Creek) ===
The Muscogee language was used as a type two code (informal) during World War II by enlisted Seminole and Creek people in the US Army. Tony Palmer, Leslie Richard, Edmund Harjo, and Thomas MacIntosh from the Seminole Nation of Oklahoma and Muscogee (Creek) Nation were recognized under the Code Talkers Recognition Act of 2008. The last survivor of these code talkers, Edmond Harjo of the Seminole Nation of Oklahoma, died on March 31, 2014, at the age of 96. His biography was recounted at the Congressional Gold Medal ceremony honoring Harjo and other code talkers at the US Capitol on November 20, 2013.

=== Navajo ===
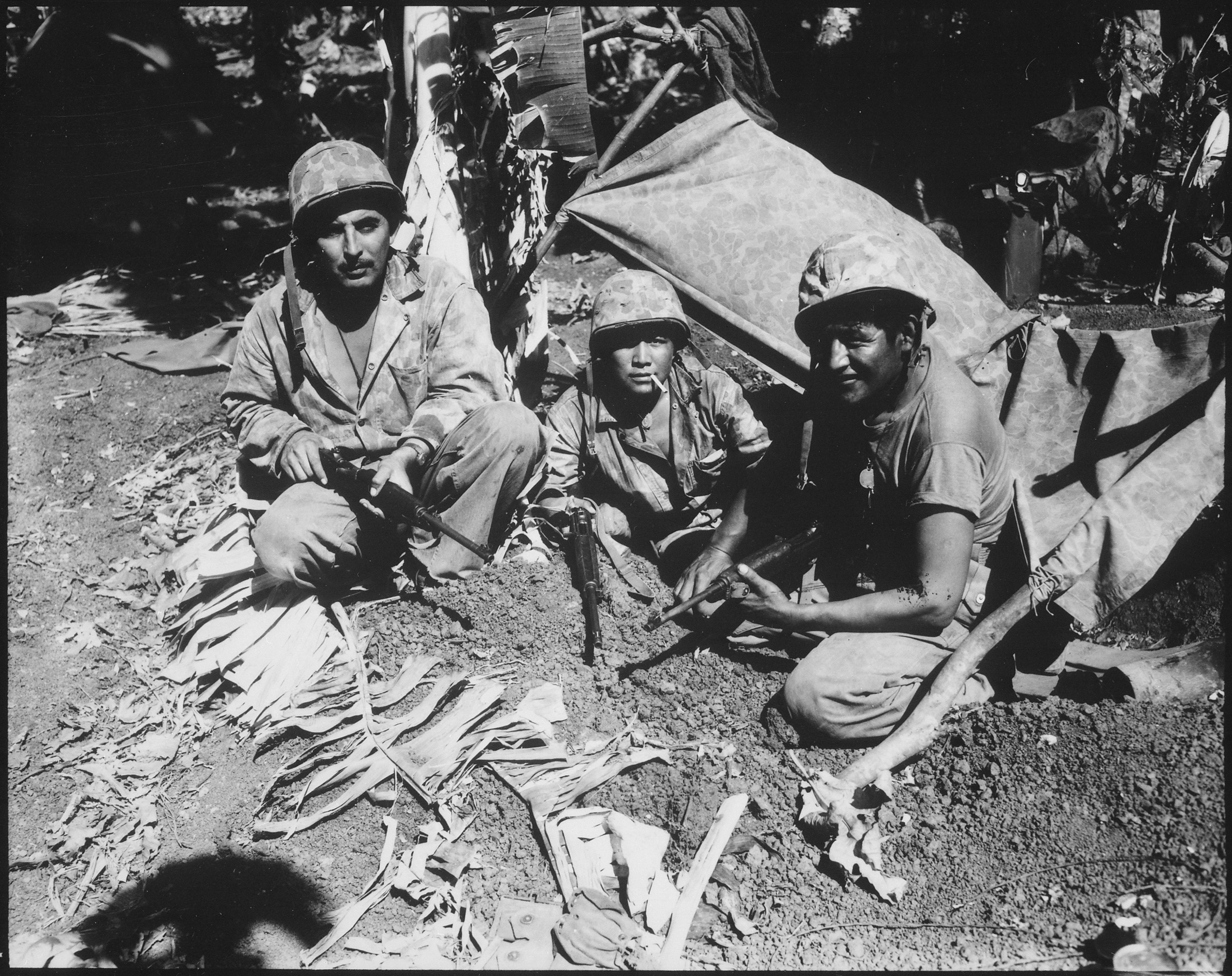
Navajo code talkers, Saipan, June 1944

Philip Johnston, a civil engineer for the city of Los Angeles, proposed the use of the Navajo language to the United States Marine Corps at the beginning of World War II. Johnston, a World War I veteran, was raised on the Navajo reservation as the son of missionaries to the Navajo. He was able to converse in "Trader's Navajo," a pidgin language. He was among a few non-Navajo who had enough exposure to it to understand some of its nuances. Many Navajo enlisted shortly after the attack on Pearl Harbor and eagerly contributed to the war effort.

In early 1942, Johnston met with the commanding general of the Amphibious Corps, Major General Clayton B. Vogel, and his staff. Johnston staged simulated combat conditions, demonstrating that Navajo men could transmit and decode a three-line message in 20 seconds, compared to the 30 minutes it took the machines of the time. The idea of using Navajo speakers as code talkers was accepted; Vogel recommended that the Marines recruit 200 Navajo. However, that recommendation was cut to one platoon to use as a pilot project to develop and test the feasibility of a code. On May 4, 1942, twenty-nine Navajo men were sworn into service at Fort Wingate, an old US Army fort converted into a Bureau of Indian Affairs boarding school. They were organized as Platoon 382. The first 29 Navajo recruits attended boot camp in May 1942. This first group created the Navajo code at Camp Pendleton.

Navajo has a complex grammar and phonology and is not meaningfully mutually intelligible with even its closest relatives within the Na-Dene family. It was still an unwritten language with numerous dialects at the time, and Johnston believed Navajo, unintelligible to anyone without extensive exposure and training, could satisfy the military requirement for an undecipherable code. According to one estimate, no more than 30 non-Navajo could understand the language at the time of World War II.

==== The First Twenty-Nine and the creation of the code ====
One of the key features of the Navajo Code Talkers is that they employed a coded version of their language. Other Navajos not trained in the Navajo Code could not decipher the messages being sent.

Platoon 382 was the Marine Corps's first "all-Indian, all-Navajo" platoon. Its members would become known as The First Twenty-Nine. Most were recruited from near the Fort Wingate, NM, area. The youngest was William Dean Yazzie (aka Dean Wilson), who was only 15 when he was recruited. The oldest was Carl N. Gorman—who with his son, R. C. Gorman, would become an artist of great acclaim and design the Code Talkers' logo—at age 35.

Names of the First Twenty-Nine and areas of birth
Code talker's name	Area of birth	Other notes to service
Samuel Begay	Toadlena, AZ	
John Brown, Jr	Chinle, AZ	
Lowell Damon	Fort Defiance, AZ	
James Dixon	Shiprock, NM	
Carl Gorman	Chinle, AZ	
Alfred Leonard	Lukachukai, AZ	
Johnny Manuelito	Sheep Springs, NM	
William McCabe	Ganado, AZ	Purple Heart
Balmer Slowtalker (aka Joe Palmer)	Leupp, AZ	
Nelson Thompson	Leupp, AZ	Purple Heart
Benjamin Cleveland	Fort Defiance, AZ	Purple Heart
Jack Nez	Canyon del Muerto, AZ	
Oscar Ilthma	Lupton, AZ	Purple Heart
George Dennison	Fort Defiance, AZ	
Chester Nez	Two Wells, AZ	
Roy Begay	Black Mountain, AZ	
Cozy Brown	Chinle, AZ	
Eugene Crawford	Tohatchi, NM	
John Benally	Fort Defiance, AZ	
Lloyd Oliver	Fruitland, NM	
John Willie	Shonto, AZ	
Charlie Begay	Tocito, NM	Purple Heart
Wilsie Bitsie	Rehoboth, NM	
Frank Denny Pete	Fruitland, NM	Purple Heart
John Chee	Tocito, NM	
Allen Dale June	Kaibito, AZ	
Harry Tsosie	Rough Rock, AZ	Purple Heart, KIA
David Curley	Phoenix, AZ	
Bill Yazzie (aka Dean Wilson)	Teec Nos Pos, AZ	

The Navajo code was formally developed and modeled on the Joint Army/Navy Phonetic Alphabet that uses agreed-upon English words to represent letters. Since it was determined that phonetically spelling out all military terms letter by letter into words while in combat would be too time-consuming, some terms, concepts, tactics, and instruments of modern warfare were given uniquely formal descriptive nomenclatures in Navajo. For example, the word for shark referred to a destroyer, while silver oak leaf indicated the rank of lieutenant colonel.

==== Deployment and evolution of the code and post-war code talkers ====
A codebook was developed to teach new initiates the many relevant words and concepts. The text was for classroom purposes only and was never to be taken into the field. The code talkers memorized all these variations and practiced their rapid use under stressful conditions during training. Navajo speakers who had not been trained in the code work would have no idea what the code talkers' messages meant; they would hear only truncated and disjointed strings of individual, unrelated nouns and verbs.

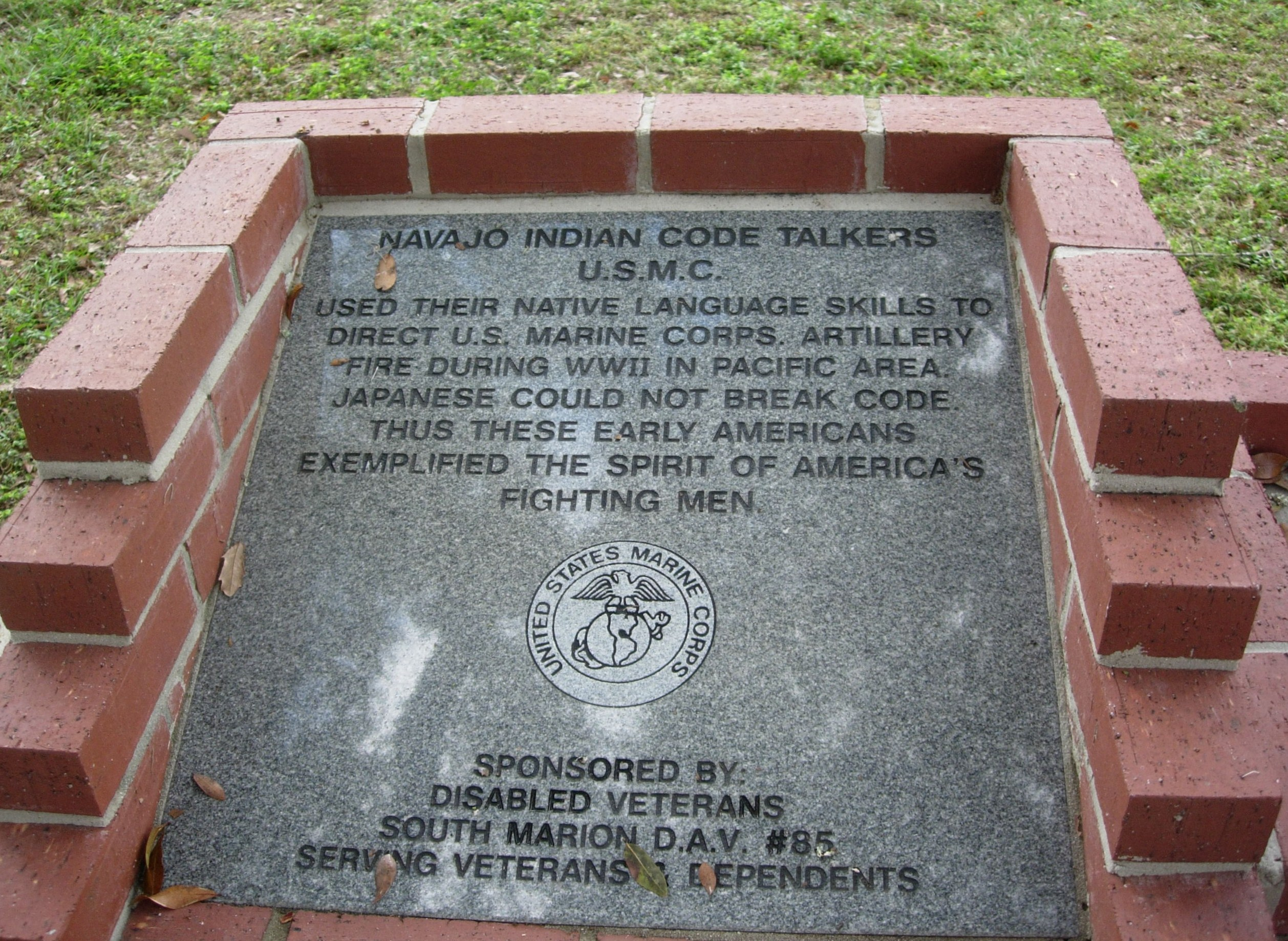
Code Talkers Monument Ocala, Florida Memorial Park

The Navajo code talkers were commended for the skill, speed, and accuracy they demonstrated throughout the war. At the Battle of Iwo Jima, Major Howard Connor, 5th Marine Division signal officer, had six Navajo code talkers working around the clock during the first two days of the battle. These six sent and received over 800 messages, all without error. Connor later said, "Were it not for the Navajos, the Marines would never have taken Iwo Jima."

After incidents where Navajo code talkers were mistaken for ethnic Japanese and were captured by other American soldiers, several were assigned a personal bodyguard whose principal duty was to protect them from their side. According to Bill Toledo, one of the second groups after the original 29, they had a secret secondary duty: if their charge was at risk of being captured, they were to shoot him to protect the code, though none were ever called upon to do so.

To ensure consistent use of code terminologies throughout the Pacific theater, representative code talkers of each of the US Marine divisions met in Hawaii to discuss shortcomings in the code, incorporate new terms into the system, and update their codebooks. These representatives, in turn, trained other code talkers who could not attend the meeting. As the war progressed, additional code words were added and incorporated program-wide. In other instances, informal shortcut code words were devised for a particular campaign and not disseminated beyond the area of operation. Examples of code words include the Navajo word for buzzard, jeeshóóʼ, which was used for bomber, while the code word used for submarine, béésh łóóʼ, meant iron fish in Navajo. The last of the original 29 Navajo code talkers who developed the code, Chester Nez, died on June 4, 2014.

Four of the last nine Navajo code talkers used in the military died in 2019: Alfred K. Newman died on January 13, 2019, at the age of 94. On May 10, 2019, Fleming Begaye Sr. died at the age of 97. New Mexico State Senator John Pinto, elected in 1977, died in office on May 24, 2019. William Tully Brown died in June 2019 aged 96. Joe Vandever Sr. died at 96 on January 31, 2020. Samuel Sandoval died on 29 July 2022, at the age of 98. John Kinsel Sr. died on 18 October 2024, at the age of 107. Only two members are still living as of 2025, Thomas H. Begay and former Navajo chairman Peter MacDonald.

Some code talkers such as Chester Nez and William Dean Yazzie (aka Dean Wilson) continued to serve in the Marine Corps through the Korean War. Rumors of the deployment of the Navajo code into the Korean War and after have never been proven. The code remained classified until 1968. The Navajo code is the only spoken military code never to have been deciphered.

=== Nubian ===
In the 1973 Arab–Israeli War, Egypt employed Nubian-speaking Nubian people as code talkers.

=== Tlingit ===
During World War II, American soldiers used their native Tlingit as a code against Japanese forces. Their actions remained unknown, even after the declassification of code talkers and the publication of the Navajo code talkers. The memory of five deceased Tlingit code talkers was honored by the Alaska legislature in March 2019.

=== Welsh ===
A system employing the Welsh language was used by British forces during World War II, but not to any great extent. In 1942, the Royal Air Force developed a plan to use Welsh for secret communications, but it was never implemented. Welsh was used more recently in the Yugoslav Wars for non-vital messages.

=== Wenzhounese ===
China used Wenzhounese-speaking people as code talkers during the 1979 Sino-Vietnamese War.

== Post-war recognition ==
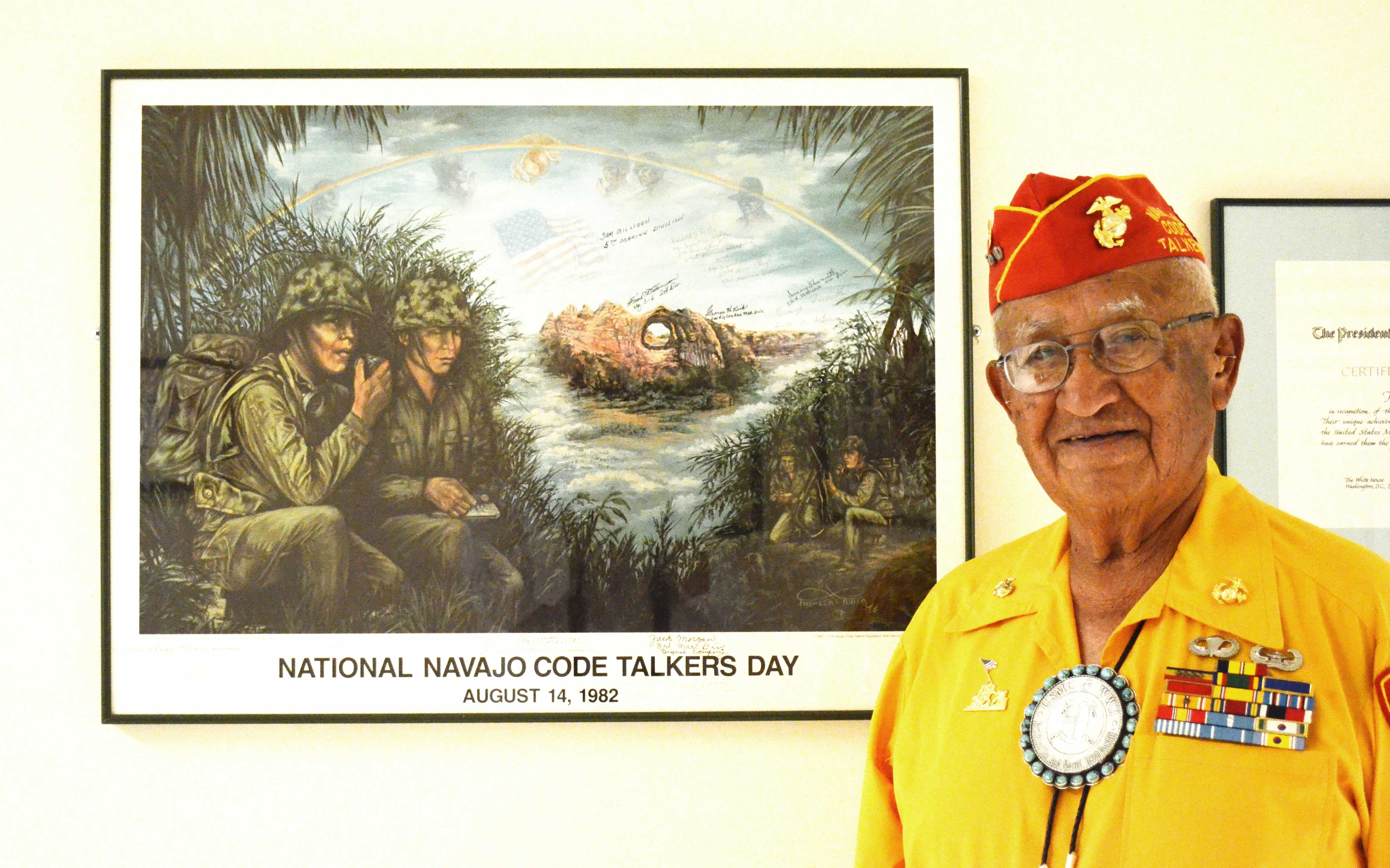
Navajo code talker veteran Thomas Begay with a framed picture commemorating National Navajo Code Talkers Day

The Navajo code talkers received no recognition until 1968 when their operation was declassified. In 1982, the code talkers were given a Certificate of Recognition by US President Ronald Reagan, who also named August 14, 1982 as Navajo Code Talkers Day.

On December 21, 2000, President Bill Clinton signed Public Law 106–554, 114 Statute 2763, which awarded the Congressional Gold Medal to the original 29 World War II Navajo code talkers and Silver Medals to each person who qualified as a Navajo code talker (approximately 300). In July 2001, President George W. Bush honored the code talkers by presenting the medals to four surviving original code talkers (the fifth living original code talker was unable to attend) at a ceremony held in the Capitol Rotunda in Washington, DC. Gold medals were presented to the families of the deceased 24 original code talkers.

Journalist Patty Talahongva directed and produced a documentary, The Power of Words: Native Languages as Weapons of War, for the Smithsonian National Museum of the American Indian in 2006, bringing to light the story of Hopi code talkers. In 2011, Arizona established April 23, as an annual recognition day for the Hopi code talkers. The Texas Medal of Valor was awarded posthumously to 18 Choctaw code talkers for their World War II service on September 17, 2007, by the Adjutant General of the State of Texas.

The Code Talkers Recognition Act of 2008 (Public Law 110–420) was signed into law by President George W. Bush on November 15, 2008. The Act recognized every Native American code talker who served in the United States military during WWI or WWII (except the already-awarded Navajo) with a Congressional Gold Medal. Approximately 50 tribes were recognized. The act was designed to be distinct for each tribe, with silver duplicates awarded to the individual code talkers or their next-of-kin. As of 2013, 33 tribes have been identified and been honored at a ceremony at Emancipation Hall at the US Capitol Visitor Center. One surviving code talker was present, Edmond Harjo.

On November 27, 2017, three Navajo code talkers, joined by the President of the Navajo Nation, Russell Begaye, appeared with President Donald Trump in the Oval Office in an official White House ceremony. They were there to "pay tribute to the contributions of the young Native Americans recruited by the United States military to create top-secret coded messages used to communicate during World War II battles." The executive director of the National Congress of American Indians, Jacqueline Pata, noted that Native Americans have "a very high level of participation in the military and veterans' service." A statement by a Navajo Nation Council Delegate and comments by Pata and Begaye, among others, objected to Trump's remarks during the event, including his use "once again ... [of] the word Pocahontas in a negative way towards a political adversary Elizabeth Warren who claims 'Native American heritage'." The National Congress of American Indians objected to Trump's use of the name Pocahontas, a historical Native American figure, as a derogatory term.

On March 17, 2025, Axios reported that at least 10 articles pertaining to Native American code talkers had disappeared from U.S. Army and Department of Defense websites. Pentagon Press Secretary John Ullyot is quoted in response: "As Secretary [Pete] Hegseth has said, DEI is dead at the Defense Department. ... We are pleased by the rapid compliance across the Department with the directive removing DEI content from all platforms."

== See also ==
- Native Americans and World War II
- United States Army Indian Scouts
- Windtalkers, a 2002 American war film on Navajo radio operators in World War II
- U.S. Department of Defense censorship of DEI-connected material
