= Aspirated consonant =

Consonant followed by a strong burst of air

Aspirated

◌ʰ
- IPA number: 404

Encoding
- Entity (decimal): &#688;
- Unicode (hex): U+02B0
Image

In phonetics, aspiration is a strong burst of breath that accompanies either the release or, in the case of preaspiration, the closure of some obstruents. In English, aspirated consonants are allophones in complementary distribution with their unaspirated counterparts, but in some other languages, notably most North American languages, South Asian languages and East Asian languages, the difference is contrastive.

== Transcription ==
In the International Phonetic Alphabet (IPA), aspirated consonants are written using the symbols for voiceless consonants followed by the aspiration modifier letter ⟨◌ʰ⟩, a superscript form of the symbol for the voiceless glottal fricative ⟨h⟩. For instance, ⟨p⟩ represents the voiceless bilabial stop, and ⟨pʰ⟩ represents the aspirated bilabial stop.

Voiced consonants are seldom actually aspirated. Symbols for voiced consonants followed by ⟨◌ʰ⟩, such as ⟨bʰ⟩, typically represent consonants with murmured voiced release (see below). In the grammatical tradition of Sanskrit, aspirated consonants are called voiceless aspirated, and breathy-voiced consonants are called voiced aspirated.

There are no dedicated IPA symbols for degrees of aspiration and typically only two degrees are marked: unaspirated ⟨k⟩ and aspirated ⟨kʰ⟩. An old symbol for light aspiration was ⟨ʻ⟩, but this is now obsolete. The aspiration modifier letter may be doubled to indicate especially strong or long aspiration. Hence, the two degrees of aspiration in Korean stops are sometimes transcribed ⟨kʰ kʰʰ⟩ or ⟨kʻ⟩ and ⟨kʰ⟩, but they are usually transcribed [k] and [kʰ], with the details of voice onset time given numerically.

Preaspirated consonants are marked by placing the aspiration modifier letter before the consonant symbol: ⟨ʰp⟩ represents the preaspirated bilabial stop.

Unaspirated or tenuis consonants are occasionally marked with the modifier letter for unaspiration ⟨◌˭⟩, a superscript equals sign: ⟨t˭⟩. Usually, however, unaspirated consonants are left unmarked: ⟨t⟩.

== Phonetics ==
Aspiration of final stops and affricates in Eastern Armenian
Final aspirated and voiceless velar stops
տաք, տակ "hot, under"
tak’ tak [tɑkʰ tɑk]

Final voiceless and aspirated alveolar affricates
այծ, այց "goat, visit"
ayc ayc’ [ɑjt͡s ɑjt͡sʰ]

Final aspirated affricate–stop cluster
գնացք "train"
gnac’k’ [ɡəˈnɑt͡sʰkʰ]

Final aspirated stop–stop cluster
աղոթք "prayer"
aġot’k’ [ɑˈʁɔtʰkʰ]

Voiceless consonants are produced with the vocal folds open (spread) and not vibrating, and voiced consonants are produced when the vocal folds are fractionally closed and vibrating (modal voice). Voiceless aspiration occurs when the vocal folds remain open after a consonant is released. An easy way to measure this is by noting the consonant's voice onset time, as the voicing of a following vowel cannot begin until the vocal folds close.

In some languages, such as Navajo, aspiration of stops tends to be phonetically realised as voiceless velar airflow; aspiration of affricates is realised as an extended length of the frication.

Aspirated consonants are not always followed by vowels or other voiced sounds. For example, in Eastern Armenian, aspiration is contrastive even word-finally, and aspirated consonants occur in consonant clusters. In Wahgi, consonants are aspirated only when they are in final position.

Kurukh distinguishes /Ch, Cʰ, Cʰh/ with occasional minimal pairs like /dʱandha:/ "astonishment" and /dʱandʱa:/ "exertion". Clusters of voiced aspirates and /h/ are possible too as in /madʒʱhi:/ "middle" and /madʒʱis/ "zamindar's agent".

=== Degree ===
The degree of aspiration varies: the voice onset time of aspirated stops is longer or shorter depending on the language or the place of articulation.

Armenian and Cantonese have aspiration that lasts about as long as English aspirated stops, in addition to unaspirated stops. Korean has lightly aspirated stops that fall between the Armenian and Cantonese unaspirated and aspirated stops as well as strongly aspirated stops whose aspiration lasts longer than that of Armenian or Cantonese.

Aspiration varies with place of articulation. The Spanish voiceless stops /p t k/ have voice onset times (VOTs) of about 5, 10, and 30 milliseconds, and English aspirated /p t k/ have VOTs of about 60, 70, and 80 ms. Voice onset time in Korean has been measured at 20, 25, and 50 ms for /p t k/ and 90, 95, and 125 for /pʰ tʰ kʰ/.

=== Doubling ===
Gemination of aspirated consonants in Eastern Armenian
Double aspirated k’k’
Մեքքա Mek’k’a "Mecca":
/ˈmekʰkʰa/ [ˈmekːʰa]

Double aspirated c’c’
կեցցե kets’ts’e "long live!":
/kʲetsʰˈtsʰe/ [kʲeˈtːsʰe]

When aspirated consonants are doubled or geminated, the stop is held longer and then has an aspirated release. An aspirated affricate consists of a stop, fricative, and aspirated release. A doubled aspirated affricate has a longer hold in the stop portion and then has a release consisting of the fricative and aspiration.

=== Preaspiration ===
Icelandic and Faroese have consonants with preaspiration [ʰp ʰt ʰk], and some scholars interpret them as consonant clusters as well. In Icelandic, preaspirated stops contrast with double stops and single stops:

Word	IPA	Meaning
kapp	[kʰɑʰp] or [kʰɑhp]	zeal
gabb	[kɑpp]	hoax
gap	[kɑːp]	opening

Preaspiration is also a feature of Scottish Gaelic:

Word	IPA	Meaning
cat	[kʰɑʰt]	cat

Preaspirated stops also occur in most Sami languages. For example, in Northern Sami, the unvoiced stop and affricate phonemes /p/, /t/, /ts/, /tʃ/, /k/ are pronounced preaspirated ([ʰp], [ʰt] [ʰts], [ʰtʃ], [ʰk]) in medial or final position. Further, Proto-Siouan is notable for contrasting aspirated stops with preaspirated stops.

=== Fricatives and sonorants ===
Although most aspirated obstruents in the world's languages are stops and affricates, aspirated fricatives such as [sʰ], [ɸʷʰ] and [ɕʰ] have been documented in Korean and Xuanzhou Wu, and [xʰ] has been described for Spanish, though these are allophones of other phonemes. Similarly, aspirated fricatives and even aspirated nasals, approximants, and trills occur in a few Tibeto-Burman languages, some Oto-Manguean languages, the Hmongic language Hmu, the Siouan language Ofo, and the Chumashan languages Barbareño and Ventureño. Some languages, such as Choni Tibetan, have as many as four contrastive aspirated fricatives [sʰ] [ɕʰ], [ʂʰ] and [xʰ].

=== Voiced consonants with voiceless aspiration ===
True aspirated voiced consonants, as opposed to murmured (breathy-voice) consonants such as the [bʱ], [dʱ], [ɡʱ] that are common among the languages of South Asia, are extremely rare. They have been documented in Kelabit.

== Phonology ==
Aspiration has varying significance in different languages. It is either allophonic or phonemic, and may be analyzed as an underlying consonant cluster.

=== Allophonic ===
Aspiration and voicing of stops in American English
Labial stops
pin with aspirated p,
spin with unaspirated p,
bin with partially voiced b,
nip with unaspirated p,
nib with partially voiced b:
[pʰɪˑn spɪˑn bɪˑn nɪp nɪˑb]

Aspiration alternation in single-stem and compound word
distend with unaspirated t,
distaste (dis-taste) with aspirated t:
[dɪˈstɛnd dɪsˈtʰeɪst]

In some languages, stops are distinguished primarily by voicing, and voiceless stops are sometimes aspirated, while voiced stops are usually unaspirated.

English voiceless stops are aspirated for most native speakers when they are word-initial or begin a stressed syllable. Pronouncing them as unaspirated in these positions, as is done by many Indian English speakers, may make them get confused with the corresponding voiced stop by other English-speakers. Conversely, this confusion does not happen with the native speakers of languages which have aspirated and unaspirated but not voiced stops, such as Mandarin Chinese.

S+consonant clusters can vary between aspirated and unaspirated forms depending on whether the cluster crosses a morpheme boundary. For example, distend features an unaspirated [t] because it is not analyzed as comprising two morphemes. In contrast, distaste includes an aspirated middle [tʰ] since it is analyzed as dis- + taste, and the word taste begins with an aspirated [t].

Word-final voiceless stops are sometimes aspirated.

Voiceless stops in Pashto are slightly aspirated prevocalically in a stressed syllable.

== Examples ==
=== Chinese ===
Aspirated stops and affricates in Mandarin Chinese
Unaspirated t
dàn [tân]

Aspirated t
tàn [tʰân]

Unaspirated ts
zǎo [tsɑʊ̀]

Aspirated ts
cǎo [tsʰɑʊ̀]

Standard Chinese (Mandarin) has stops and affricates distinguished by aspiration: for instance, /t tʰ/, /t͡s t͡sʰ/. In pinyin, tenuis stops are written with letters that represent voiced consonants in English, and aspirated stops with letters that represent voiceless consonants. Thus d represents /t/, and t represents /tʰ/.

Wu Chinese and Southern Min has a three-way distinction in stops and affricates: /p pʰ b/. In addition to aspirated and unaspirated consonants, there is a series of muddy consonants, like /b/. These are pronounced with slack or breathy voice: that is, they are weakly voiced. Muddy consonants as initial cause a syllable to be pronounced with low pitch or light (陽 yáng) tone.

=== Indian languages ===
Retroflex stops in Hindi
टाल, ठाल, डाल, ढाल ṭāl ṭhāl ḍāl ḍhāl "postpone, wood shop, branch, shield" [ʈal ʈʰal ɖal ɖʱal]

Many Indo-Aryan languages have aspirated stops. Sanskrit, Hindustani, Bengali, Marathi, and Gujarati have a four-way distinction in stops: voiceless, aspirated, voiced, and voiced aspirated, such as /p pʰ b bʱ/. Punjabi has lost voiced aspirated consonants, which resulted in a tone system, and therefore has a distinction between voiceless, aspirated, and voiced: /p pʰ b/.

Other languages such as Telugu, Malayalam, and Kannada, have a distinction between voiced and voiceless, aspirated and unaspirated. However, in all of these languages, aspirated consonant occur (mostly) in borrowed words, and commonly substituted with their unaspirated counterparts.

=== Armenian ===
Voicing and aspiration in Eastern Armenian stops and affricates
Dental stops
դուր, տուր, թուր
"chisel, give!, sword"
dur, tur, tʻur
[duɾ tuɾ tʰuɾ]

Final voiced, voiceless, and aspirated velar stops
թագ, թակ, թաք
"crown, mallet, only"
tʻag tʻak tʻakʻ:
[tʰɑɡ tʰɑk tʰɑkʰ]

Dental affricates
ձախ, ծախ, ցախ
"left-hand, sale, brushwood"
jax cax cʻax:
[dzɑχ tsɑχ tsʰɑχ]

Most dialects of Armenian have aspirated stops, and some have breathy-voiced stops.

Classical and Eastern Armenian have a three-way distinction between voiceless, aspirated, and voiced, such as /t tʰ d/.

Western Armenian has a two-way distinction between aspirated and voiced: /tʰ d/. Western Armenian aspirated /tʰ/ corresponds to Eastern Armenian aspirated /tʰ/ and voiced /d/, and Western voiced /d/ corresponds to Eastern voiceless /t/.

=== Greek ===
Modern Greek has the voiceless and voiced dental fricatives, /θ ð/. Ancient Greek, including the Classical Attic and Koine Greek dialects, had a three-way distinction in stops like Eastern Armenian: /t tʰ d/. These series were called ψιλά, δασέα, μέσα (psilá, daséa, mésa) "smooth, rough, intermediate", respectively, by Koine Greek grammarians.

There were aspirated stops at three places of articulation: labial, coronal, and velar /pʰ tʰ kʰ/. Earlier Greek, represented by Mycenaean Greek, likely had a labialized velar aspirated stop /kʷʰ/, which later became labial, coronal, or velar depending on dialect and phonetic environment.

The other Ancient Greek dialects, Ionic, Doric, Aeolic, and Arcadocypriot, likely had the same three-way distinction at one point, but Doric seems to have had a fricative in place of /tʰ/ in the Classical period.

Later, during the Koine and Medieval Greek periods, the aspirated and voiced stops /tʰ d/ of Attic Greek lenited to voiceless and voiced fricatives, yielding /θ ð/ in Medieval and Modern Greek. Cypriot Greek is notable for aspirating its inherited (and developed across word-boundaries) voiceless geminate stops, yielding the series /pʰː tʰː cʰː kʰː/.

== Other uses ==
=== Debuccalization ===
The term aspiration sometimes refers to the sound change of debuccalization, in which a consonant is lenited (weakened) to become a glottal stop or fricative [ʔ h ɦ].

=== Breathy-voiced release ===
So-called voiced aspirated consonants are nearly always pronounced instead with breathy voice, a type of phonation or vibration of the vocal folds. The modifier letter ⟨◌ʰ⟩ after a voiced consonant actually represents a breathy-voiced or murmured consonant, as with the "voiced aspirated" bilabial stop ⟨bʰ⟩ in the Indo-Aryan languages. This consonant is therefore more accurately transcribed as ⟨b̤⟩, with the diacritic for breathy voice, or with the modifier letter ⟨bʱ⟩, a superscript form of the symbol for the voiced glottal fricative ⟨ɦ⟩.

Some linguists restrict the double-dot subscript ⟨◌̤⟩ to murmured sonorants, such as vowels and nasals, which are murmured throughout their duration, and use the superscript tophook-h ⟨◌ʱ⟩ for the breathy-voiced release of obstruents.

== See also ==
- Aspirated h
- Implosive consonant
- Index of phonetics articles
- Rough breathing
- Smooth breathing
