= Tlingit grammar =

The Tlingit language is a Na-Dene language spoken by the Tlingit people who are indigenous to most of Southeast Alaska. Its grammar has features similar to that of other languages belonging to the Northwest Coast Sprachbund, including SOV word order, a rich aspectual system, and optional plural marking. The grammar is also similar to other Na-Dene languages like Eyak and the Athabaskan languages, for instance in their shared complexity of verb morphology.

== Nouns ==
Nouns in Tlingit are generally much less internally complex than verbs, with some multisyllabic nouns consisting of only one morpheme. However, nouns have systems for compounding and derivation in addition to some suffixes, including a single inflectional suffix.

=== Possession and alienability ===
Nouns in Tlingit can be divided into two classes, possessable and unpossessable. This division is based on whether a particular noun may have a possessed relationship with another noun. In Tlingit the names for people and places (proper nouns) are unpossessable, while other nouns may be either optionally or obligatorily possessed (called alienable and inalienable, respectively).

Alienable nouns may be used alone or may be possessed by another noun or pronoun. In the latter case, the possessed noun takes the suffix -ÿi, and, if the possessor is a pronoun, the possessive pronominal is used. -ÿi is the only inflectional suffix used for nouns. In contrast, inalienable nouns cannot appear without a possessor. Inalienable nouns commonly refer to kinship terms and body parts. Inalienable nouns are not normally marked for possession; that is, they do not take the possessed -ÿi suffix. However, if the possessed suffix is used on an inalienable noun, the meaning changes from being part of a body to a body part that is somehow separated from the rest of the body. Thus xóots shá means "a bear's head", but xóots shayí means "a bear's head (detached from its body)".

=== Suffixes ===
There are three nominal suffixes that do not function as postpositions: the possessed, the plural, and the diminutive. The possessed suffix -ÿi has eight allomorphs. After a vowel, it will appear with an initial consonant (either y or w), whereas if it appears after a consonant, it will only surface as a vowel (-i or -u). Its tone is the opposite of the stem vowel, so that a low-toned stem vowel will trigger a high tone on the suffix (i.e. yí) while a high-toned stem vowel will do the reverse. Roundedness from a vowel or final consonant spreads to the suffix, so it will be pronounced as [wu] or [u].

The nominal plural suffix -xʼ (-xʼw after central vowels) may be attached to most nouns, but it is optional. For example, ḵaa/ḵaaxʼw means "man"/"men", ax̱ yádi/ax̱ yátxʼi means "my child"/"my children". Kinship terms are pluralized using the hás or ÿán enclitics, which are postnominal modifiers. Meanwhile, the diminutive suffix has the form -kʼ (-kʼw after central vowels) and can also attach to verbal phrases.

=== Adnominal modifiers ===
Adnominal modifiers can be prenominal (before the noun) or postnominal (after the noun). Prenominal modifiers include numerals, demonstratives, and some descriptive modifiers like yées ("young"). Postnominal modifiers are all descriptive, including words like tlein ("big"), and many are derived from verbs. The descriptive modifiers are analogous to adjectives in English, although they cannot be predicates.

The order of the adnominal modifiers in relation to the noun according to Constance Naish is given below. Although she gives six different positions for the modifiers, she notes that not more than three at once are typically found in a single phrase and there are usually at most two modifiers if one of them is expressed as a phrase construct.

	Prenominal						Postnominal
No.	+5	+4	+3	+2	+1	Noun	-1
Type	ldakát "all"	Demonstrative	Numeral	Possessive	Descriptive	Noun	Descriptive

=== Compounds and derivation ===
Compound nouns consist of a combination of noun and/or locative root(s). The maximal structure of a compound has a noun, locative, and noun root, although they do not need to contain a locative at all and can consist of just two noun roots, as in lʼutʼtláaḵ "snake" (lʼútʼ "tongue" + tláaḵ "arrowhead"). Some compounds with two noun stems have the possessed suffix -ÿi regardless of whether they appear with a possessor. These can be related to the possessive structure because the first element of the compound may be acting as a possessor, as in x̱aawaag̱éi "window" (x̱aa + waag̱ + -ÿi, lit. "steam bath house's eye").

Compounds with the root át "thing" are quite common. It has the bound form -eit and occurs with the locative roots k- "surface, on" and y- "under". For example, x̱’uskeit "leggings" is derived from x̱’us "foot, leg" and -keit (on it), and shayeit "pillow" is derived from sha "head" and -yeit (under it).

Roots of compound stems often alternate in vowel quality with roots of simple stems. For instance, they may use short rather than long vowels or central vowels rather than an open and front vowel. High tone is only allowed on the head of a compound, and the tonic syllable is always in the final root.

Nouns can be derived from verb roots or verb stems consisting of a root and stem-forming suffix. They contain elements of the verb theme with or without derivational suffixes. Derived nouns lacking a derivational suffix include such nouns as atx̱á "food" (at "indefinite object pronominal" + x̱a "eat") and yoo x̱’atánk "word, language" (directional yoo + x̱’a- "mouth" + tan "carry" + repetitive -k). There are four derivational suffixes: -i "-er", -a instrumental, -dasi fragmentive, and -adi patientive.

== Pronouns ==
Tlingit has a complex system of pronouns which vary depending on their relationship to syntactic categories including the verb, in addition to agency and saliency in the third-person pronouns. The subject pronouns are incorporated into the verb in its subject slot. The object pronouns are divided into three forms: the verbal object, nominal object, and postpositional object. The independent pronouns are separate from the verb and occur in independent noun phrases for emphasis.

The pronouns can be visualized in the following table.

		Subject	Object			Independent
		Subject	VO	NO	PO	Independent
1	SINGULAR	x̱a-	x̱at, ax̱	ax̱	x̱a-	x̱át
1	PLURAL	too-	haa	haa		uháan
2	SINGULAR	ee-	i-	i		wa.é
2	PLURAL	yi-	yee-	yee		yeewáan (Note: This pronoun has several variable forms depending on dialect, including yeeháan, eewáan, and eeyáan.)
3	NEUTRAL	Ø-	a-, Ø-	du	u-	hú
3	RECESSIVE	Ø-	a-, Ø-	a	a-	
3	SALIENT	Ø-	ash	ash		
REFLEXIVE			sh-, Ø-	chush		
RECIPROCAL			woosh	woosh		
Indefinite	HUMAN	du-	ḵu-, ḵaa-	ḵaa	ḵu-	
Indefinite	NON-HUMAN		at-	at		
PARTITIVE			aa			

The first and second person pronouns both have a distinction between singular and plural. The third person pronouns, which in object form are distinguished as neutral, recessive, and salient, communicate agency and salience. A human third person may be pluralized by the addition of the proclitic has before the verb, although the plural is often communicated in other ways. Non-human referents are pluralized with the proclitic dax̱, which can also be a distributive plural. The indefinite pronouns are a type of fourth person and distinguish between human and non-human referents.

The subject pronouns are all incorporated into the verb. Object pronouns are divided into three classes: the verbal (VO), nominal (NO), and postpositional (PO). The verbal object pronouns act as the direct object of a verb are incorporated into the verb. The nominal object pronouns are used as possessive pronouns and are often referred to as such. Leer calls them nominal objects because they are almost identical in shape to the VO pronouns and they act as the object to an incorporated inalienable noun. Postpositional object pronouns are the complement of a postposition.

=== Third person pronouns ===
There is only one class of third person subject in Tlingit, but there are three classes of third person object (neutral, recessive, and salient). This system of object pronouns exist in parallel to similar systems (called "anaphora") in many Athabaskan languages, including in Navajo. All these anaphora have roots in Proto Na-Dene, although Tlingit has a particularly complex system.

In the system, a referent can be either an agent or a non-agent. Agents can only be humans, supernatural beings, natural forces, or personified animals; by contrast, a non-agent is anything else, including other animals, inanimate objects, plants, places, and ideas. Non-agents may only be referred to using the recessive pronouns, while the pronominal for an agent is determined by the presence and situation of saliency.

Saliency is only considered when the following criteria are met:

1. the subject is also third-person
2. both subject and object are agents
3. the subject and object are opposed (or contrasted) in the discourse

If saliency is not considered, then the neutral pronominal is used for the agent object. If it is considered, then relative agency is used to determine which pronominal to use for the object. If the object has less agency than the subject, then the recessive pronominal is used; if it has more agency, then the salient pronominal is used. Relative agency is determined both by the degree of control the actors have over a situation and how well the speaker identifies with each of the actors (for instance, whether they are part of the same clan). However, although the agency of the actors may shift in the discourse, the use of anaphora is generally consistent throughout a narrative.

For instance, in a situation where the protagonist of a story is the object of a sentence, while someone else with less agency is the subject, a translation of "He found her" would be:

ash ø- wu- i- tʼi
3.SAL.OBJ 3.SUB- PFV- STV- find
"He found her"

In the opposite situation, where the subject has more agency than the object, a translation of the same sentence would be:

a- ø- wu- i- tʼi
3.REC.OBJ 3.SUB PFV- STV- find
"He found her"

Conversely, if a human speaker were to sit on a chair (which is inanimate), one could say:

a ká- t wu- x̱a- ÿa- nuk
3.REC.OBJ- surface- to PFV- 1S.SUB- CL- sit
"I sat down on it"

But if that same speaker sat on another person, one would say:

du ká- t wu- x̱a- ÿa- nuk
3.NEU.OBJ- surface- to PFV- 1S.SUB- CL- sit
"I sat down on him/her"

There is no distinction of agency in the verbal object pronouns. So, the neutral and recessive object prefixes of the nominal and postpositional objects correspond to just one non-salient object prefix for the verbal object pronouns. This prefix, a-, is only pronounced when required by the theme, the subject is also third-person, and it is used for an indefinite object. Otherwise, it is null. It is also unpronounced if the subject is a noun phrase with the ergative suffix -ch and the noun phrase is adjacent to the verb.

== Postpositions ==
Nominal cases in Tlingit are designated by postpositions, however they usually behave morphologically like suffixes.

Case	Form	Use	Example
Ergative	-ch	Marks the agent of a transitive verb with a definite object. The meaning is roughly "by means of" and is consistent with other split ergative languages. When discussing the two arguments of the verb in an ergative sentence, the marked agent is called the "ergative argument" and the definite object is called the "absolutive argument". Note that Tlingit lacks an absolutive case, instead the absolutive argument is not marked.	tá-ch x̱at u-ÿa-jaḵ sleep-ERG 1SG.OBJ PFV-STV-kill "I fell asleep." (lit. "Sleep has killed me")
Punctual	-t	When used with a positional imperfective it designates physical position, roughly meaning "(resting) at". When used in a telic derivative it means "(coming) to", "(arriving) at"; while in an atelic na-aspect derivative it means "(moving) about".	naadáakw ká-t x̱a-áa table surface-PUNCT 1SG.SUBJ-sit "I am seated on top of the table."
Pertingent	-x̱	Can mean an extended physical location or extended contact with an object, e.g. "(usually or always) at". In another sense it indicates repetitive physical arrival, as in "repeatedly arriving at", "always coming to". In a third sense it indicates physical status, i.e. "in the form of".	Lingít-x̱ haa sa-tee-ÿi (lingít); Tlingit-PERT 1PL.OBJ APL-be-REL (person/people) "We who are Tlingit"
Locative	-xʼ	May indicate physical location, such as "at a place", "by a place", "in a structure". It can be extended by analogy to temporal location, such as "at a time", "by a time".	Aangóon-xʼ yéi x̱at ÿatee Angoon-LOC thus 1SG.OBJ be "I am/live in Angoon." Sándi-xʼ yéi [ga-u-g̱a]-x̱a-ÿa-gút Sunday-LOC thus [ASCN-IRR-DESCN]-1SG.SUBJ-STV-come "I will come on/by Sunday."
Adessive	-g̱aa	Indicates physical adjacency to place or object, such as "around", "by". By extension of this concept it may indicate physical succession, "(go) after something" or "(follow) something", as well as the temporal associations of "(waiting) for something" and "about (a time)", "around (a time)".	
Ablative	-dax̱	Marks the physical origin of an action, translated as "from (a place)" or "out of (a place)". By temporal extension it means "since (a time)" or "from (a time)".	
Prolative	-náx̱	Marks a course of physical translation by some action, translated as "along (a way)" or "via (a path)". Temporal extension indicates the translation of an action along a duration of time, or the inclusion of a period of time, thus "during (some period)", "including (some time)".	Lingít x̱ʼéi-nax̱ waa sá ∅-du-wa-sáa-kw Tlingit mouth-PROL how Q ∅.OBJ-INDH.SUBJ-PFV-name-REP "How is (it) called in Tlingit?" (lit. "How is it named by the Tlingit mouth?")
Allative	-dei	Marks a physical or temporal destination, translated as "to, toward" and "until", respectively. It may also describe an analogical motion, "in the manner of".	sgóon-dei yaa na-x̱a-u-ÿa-gút school-ALL along PROG-1SG.OBJ-PFV-STV-go "I went towards school"
Comitative-instrumental	-tin	May describe either the instrumental "with (a utensil)", "by means of (something)", or the comitative "with (something, someone)", "along with (something, someone)".	
Locative-predicative	-u	Functions as a postposition plus a nonverbal predicate.	

Other postpositions function as separate words, and include:

- g̱óot — "without"
- náḵ — "away from"
- yís — "for"
- yáx̱ — "like, as much as, according to"
- yánáx̱ — "more than"
- ḵín — "less than"

== Directionals ==
In Tlingit, directionals are a semantic category which indicate direction relative to some stated position. The stated position can be some element of the natural environment, a structure, or a person or group of people. Syntactically, directionals are a subcategory of nouns because, like nouns, they can be arguments of verbs and objects of postpositions. Some examples of directionals can be seen below.

	Noun	N-dei	N-naa	Adverb (+15)
up above	(di-)kée	(di-)kín-dei	(di-)kee-naa	kei, kéi
down below	(di-)yée	(di-)yín-dei	(di-)yee-naa	yei, yéi, yaa
upstream	naakée	nán-dei	naa-nyaa ~ naa-naa	–
downstream	ix-kée, éex	íx-dei	ixi-naa	–
from landshore, interior	dáaḵ	dáḵ-dei	daḵi-naa	daaḵ
from seashore, out to sea	dei-kí	dák-dei	daki-naa ~ diki-naa	daak
inside	neil	neil-dei	—	neil
outside	gáan	gán-dei	—	—

== Verbs ==
Tlingit verbs are highly complex and are frequently termed polysynthetic as a single verb can be the equivalent of a whole English sentence. They are often the only element of a verb phrase, and include information relating to its argument(s), tense, mood, and qualities of the object(s), among other specifications.

Verbs consist of lexical groupings called themes plus inflectional and derivational strings. Themes consist minimally of a root, classifier, the transitivity class and aspectual category (the last of which may be unspecified depending on the theme), and optionally thematic affixes. Verb roots undergo predictable stem variation that determines their pronunciation. The classifier, also termed extensor by Gillian Story and Constance Naish, has functions related to valency, voice, and stativity. The verb theme is the foundation from which lexically identical verbs are built. Derivational and inflectional strings are added to the theme to create a surface verb form.

The order of the affixes in verbal (thematic), derivational, and inflectional strings is commonly expressed using template morphology, as is typical with polysynthetic languages. James Crippen has criticized verb templates in analyses of Tlingit grammar as they fail to explain interdependencies between morphemes. The issue of template morphology has also been addressed for the Athabaskan languages, and some Athabaskanists as well as Crippen have argued that the verb word in Na-Dene languages should be examined as a syntactic structure rather than an arbitrary sequence of affixes.

=== Template ===
Domain	Position	Description	Example morpheme(s)
Preverb	+17H-A	preverbs	g̱unayéi, "beginning"
Preverb	+16	reciprocal and distributive	woosh, "each other"
Preverb	+15	plural	has
Disjunct	+14	objects	yee- "you guys"
Disjunct	+13	areal	ḵu-
Disjunct	+12	outer incorporates	ḵee-, "day"
Disjunct	+11	inner incorporates	x̱ʼe-, "mouth"
Conjunct	+10	y-qualifiers	ÿ-, ~ "face"
Conjunct	+9	k-qualifiers	k-, ~ "horizontal surface"
Conjunct	+8	self-benefactive	g-
Conjunct	+7	outer conjugation	g-
Conjunct	+6	irrealis	u-, w-
Conjunct	+5	conjugation and aspect	ø, n-, g̱-, wu-, u-
Conjunct	+4	modality	g̱-
Conjunct	+3	inner distributive	dag̱-
Conjunct	+2	subjects	x̱- "I"
Classifier	+1	classifier	ÿa-
Stem	0	ROOT	
Stem	-1	stem variation	Vː, Vʰ, Vˀ, -ÿ, -n
Stem	-2	repetitives and derivation	-kw, repetitive
Stem	-3	modality suffixes	-ní
Stem	-4	tense	ín, past tense
Stem	-5	clause type	-í, subordinate clause
Stem	-6	auxiliaries	nooch, "always"

=== Stem variation ===
Verb roots are classified as either variable or invariable. Variable roots are of the form CV(C) and alternate in vowel length, tone, and sometimes quality (apophony). This is called stem variation and is conditioned by root type, aspect, mood, modality and polarity, as well as other considerations. Invariable roots include all roots not of the form CV(C) in addition to a few CV(C) roots that are lexically specified to be invariable. They are not affected by stem variation, so their vowel length, tone, and quality remain constant.

Five root types are specified by Jeff Leer: CVC, CVCʼ, CVʼC (the closed roots), CV, and CV` (the open roots). Their stem variation in Northern Tlingit is given in the following tables. In the tables, ⟨C⟩ represents any consonant and ⟨V⟩ represents any vowel, which is indicated for tone (⟨V́⟩ or ⟨V̀⟩) and length (⟨:⟩ or ∅). ⟨X⟩ represents an obstruent suffix other than ⟨n⟩ or ⟨ÿ⟩.

Closed roots
	CVC	CVCʼ	CVʼC
Reduced	CV́C	CV́Cʼ	CV́C
Lengthened	CV́:C	CV́:Cʼ	CV́:Cʼ
Fading	CV̀:C	CV́:Cʼ	CV́:C

Open roots
	CV	CV`
X-stem	Cé:X	Ce:`X
n-stem	Cé:n	Cé:n
ÿ-stem	CV́:	CV́:
Lengthened	CV́:	CV́:
Fading	CV`/CV́	CV`/CV́
Glottalized	CV́	CV́

Open roots undergo apophony when suffixed with X or n (not ÿ) from /a u/ > [eː] as demonstrated above. Root vowels other than /a u/ are not affected. For example, the root .i "cook" is not affected, but the root x̱a "eat" is affected by apophony when suffixed with -x̱ (repetitive).

x̱- s- .ée -x̱
1SG.SUB- CAUS- cook.VAR -REP
I repeatedly cook it.

x̱- x̱éi -x̱
1SG.SUB- eat.VAR -REP
I repeatedly eat it.

In the X-stem forms, the CV` roots surface as low toned whereas the CV roots surface as high toned. This results in alternations such as x̱asatéix̱ "I am repeatedly boiling it" and x̱ateix̱ "I am repeatedly sleeping". The roots for "boil" and "sleep" are homophonous in other forms. The fading stems only appear in a particular kind of imperfective. There are a few irregular open roots.

=== Classifier ===
The classifier is a shared and defining feature of the Na-Dene languages. In all members, it has functions related to valency and voice, while in Tlingit it has the additional function of communicating stativity. The classifier has a misleading name, as its function is not primarily a classificatory one. However, the terminology is conventional in both Tlingit and Athabaskan linguistics.

The table below represents the sixteen base forms of the Tlingit classifier, each of which is assigned a positive or negative value of S, D, and I (called components). A positive value represents presence of the component, while a negative value represents absence of the component. The broad functions of these components, respectively, are valency (S), voice (D), and stativity (I).

		-D		+D	
		-I	+I	-I	+I
-S	ø	ø-	ya-	da-	di-
+S	l	la-	li-	l-	dli-
+S	s	sa-	si-	s-	dzi-
+S	sh	sha-	shi-	sh-	ji-

==== Valency ====
The S-Component, also known as the Series Component, adds or restricts arguments of a verb. It has four manifestations, or series, in Tlingit: ø-, l-, s-, and sh-. The latter three series are parallel to each other and can be jointly referred to as the non-ø- series.

Verbs are specified for valency type, and the l- and s- series can increase the valency of a verb, either by adding an internal (within the verb) or external (outside of the verb) argument. Thus, they are used in forming causatives from intransitives and applicatives from transitives. In addition, they are required for a lexically specified set of "nullivalent" verbs, which are ungrammatical without them. The selection between the l- and s- series is partially determined by phonotactics, where a stem coronal fricative or affricate requires the use of the l- series, but in other situations the use of one versus the other is irregular. The S-Component can only add one argument at a time; for example, alternation between the ø- and s- series cannot derive a ditransitive verb from an avalent verb.

The non-ø- series, including the sh- series, can also restrict arguments semantically. The use of these series can denote pejoration (speaker's disapproval) or extension through space or time. The sh- series is usually only used for restriction, although it appears with a causative-like function in some themes.

==== Voice ====
The D-Component suppresses arguments of the verb, for instance by marking the antipassive and passive voices. It is also used with the middle voice, which is triggered by several different grammatical operations such as reflexives and reciprocals, but it can also be lexically specified. It is also triggered by the indefinite human pronoun.

-xʼ, the nominal plural suffix, can also be used on verbs as part of a plural verb theme. This triggers the use of the D component, whereas the singular equivalent does not use the D component. However, it is not used in the comparative forms of these themes. For instance:

ya- géi
-S -D +I- big.VAR
It is big.

di- géi -xʼ
-S +D +I- big.VAR -PL
They are big.

ax̱ yáanáx̱ k- u- di- géi
1SG.OBJ more.than COMP- IRR- -S +D +I- big.VAR
They are bigger than me.

ax̱ yáanáx̱ k- u- di- géi -xʼ
1SG.OBJ more.than COMP- IRR- -S +D +I- big.VAR -PL
*They are bigger than me.

==== Stativity ====
The I-Component of the classifier was described by Franz Boas and Story as indicating "definiteness of time", while Michael E. Krauss connected it to the Eyak stativity prefix yi- ~ i-. The semantics of this component have otherwise seldom been explored. Crippen formally defined it as denoting stativity, being either lexically or grammatically specified. It is directly connected to lexical aspect.

== Particles ==
Particles function as delimiters to a clause or phrase. They are syntactically inert, meaning they are not inflected and do not affect syntactic selection; i.e., a particle added to a noun phrase still results in a noun phrase. The focus and phrasal particles are also termed clitics because they are phonologically bound to a phrase. Many particles can be combined.

=== Focus ===
The focus particles follow the left periphery of a sentence. Many of them may be suffixed with a demonstrative (-yá, -hé, -wé, -yú), and they may also be combined with the interrogative (-gé ~ -gí). For example:

- á — focus
- ágé — interrogative (< á + gé)
- ásgé — second hand information, "I hear...", "they say..." (< ásé + gé)
- ḵu.aa — contrastive, "however"
- óosh — hypothetical, "as if", "even if", "if only"

The focus particle sá is obligatory in forming wh-question phrases.

=== Phrasal ===
Phrasal particles may be either pre-phrasal or post-phrasal, meaning they occur either before or after the phrase they modify, respectively. Most of the pre-phrasal particles can be used with the imperative, hortative, or admonitive moods. The post-phrasal particles generally have an intensifying meaning. For example:

- tsú — "also" (pre-phrasal)
- déi — "now", "this time" (pre-phrasal)
- chʼas — "only", "just" (post-phrasal)
- tlax̱ — "very" (post-phrasal)

=== Mobile ===
The mobile particles may occur before or after any phrase in a clause. For example:

- tlei — "just," "simply," "just then"
- déi — "already," "by now"
- tsu — "again", "still", "some more"

=== Sentence-initial ===
The sentence-initial particles may only occur at the front of a sentence. For example:

- tléik, l — negative, "not"
- gwál — dubitative, "perhaps"
- gu.aal — optative, "hopefully"
- ḵaju, x̱aju — contrary, "actually", "in fact"

== Syntax ==
=== Word order ===
Tlingit is by default an SOV language, but nevertheless word order is quite flexible. The SOV order is most apparent when object and (non-pronominal) agent phrases both exist in the sentence. However, there is a tendency to restrict the arguments of the verb phrase to a single non-pronominal noun phrase, with any other arguments being integrated into the verb. This can cause the appearance of an OSV word order, but it has been shown that this is not a correct analysis of Tlingit syntax.

== Bibliography ==
- Boas, Franz (1917). "Grammatical notes on the language of the Tlingit Indians". The University Museum Anthropological Publications. 8 (1). Philadelphia: University of Pennsylvania.
- Burge, Heather (2017). Prospective Aspect in Tlingit (Master of Arts thesis). Vancouver: University of British Columbia.
- Cable, Seth (2007). The grammar of Q: Q-particles and the nature of wh-fronting, as revealed by the wh-questions of Tlingit (Doctor of Philosophy thesis). Massachusetts Institute of Technology.
- Cable, Seth (2008), "Introduction to the Peoples and Languages of the Pacific Northwest", Theoretical Perspectives on Languages of the Pacific Northwest (PDF), University of Massachusetts Amherst
- Cable, Seth (2014), "Average Conditional Entropy of the Tlingit Verbal Inflection Paradigm: A Brief Report", in Baković, Eric (ed.), Short 'schrift for Alan Prince
- Cable, Seth (2017). "The Expression of Modality in Tlingit: A Paucity of Grammatical Devices". International Journal of American Linguistics. 83 (4): 619–678. JSTOR 26559510.
- Crippen, James A. (12 October 2010). Lingít Yoo X̱ʼatángi: A Grammar of the Tlingit Language (PDF).
- Crippen, James (2011). "Basics of Tlingit Verbal Structure" (PDF). Vancouver: Department of Linguistics. University of British Columbia.
- Crippen, James A. (2019). The syntax in Tlingit verbs (Doctor of Philosophy thesis). University of British Columbia (Vancouver).
- Crippen, James A.; Déchaine, Rose-Marie (2016), "Syntax and semantics of the Tlingit classifier", Proceedings of WSCLA 20: The Workshop on Structure and Constituency in Languages of the Americas, Vancouver: UBC Department of Linguistics
- Dryer, Matthew (1985). "Tlingit: An object-initial language?". Canadian Journal of Linguistics. 30 (1): 1–13. doi:10.1017/S0008413100010653. S2CID 149665991.
- Edwards, Keri (2009). Dictionary of Tlingit (PDF). Juneau, Alaska: Sealaska Heritage Institute. ISBN 978-0-9825786-6-7.
- Eggleston, Keri (2013). 575 Tlingit Verbs: A Study of Tlingit Verb Paradigms (Doctor of Philosophy thesis). Fairbanks: University of Alaska Fairbanks.
- Krauss, Michael E. (1968). "Noun-classification systems in the Athapaskan, Eyak, Tlingit and Haida verbs". International Journal of American Linguistics. 34 (3): 194–203. doi:10.1086/465014.
- Krauss, Michael E. (1969). On the classification in the Athapascan, Eyak, and the Tlingit verb. Baltimore: Waverly Press by Indiana University. OCLC 5691471.
- Leer, Jeff (1989). "Directional Systems in Athapaskan and Na-Dene". In Cook, Eung-Do; Rice, Keren (eds.). Athapaskan Linguistics: Current Perspectives on a Language Family. Mouton de Gruyter. ISBN 0899252826.
- Leer, Jeffery A. (1990). "Tlingit: A portmanteau language family?". In Baldi, P. (ed.). Linguistics change and reconstruction methodology. Berlin: Mouton de Gruyter. pp. 73–98. doi:10.1515/9783110886092.73. ISBN 978-3-11-011908-4.
- Leer, Jeffery A. (1991). The Schetic Categories of the Tlingit verb (PhD dissertation). Chicago: University of Chicago.
- Leer, Jeff (1993), The Tlingit Anaphoric System and its roots in Na-Dene (PDF), Alaska Native Language Center
- Leer, Jeff (2008). "Recent advances in AET comparison". CA965L2008b.
- Naish, Constance M. (1966). A syntactic study of Tlingit (MA thesis). University of North Dakota.
- Naish, Constance M.; Story, Gillian L. (1973). Tlingit verb dictionary. Summer Institute of Linguistics. ISBN 0-933769-25-3.
- Rice, Keren (2000). Morpheme order and semantic scope: Word formation in the Athapaskan verb. Cambridge: Cambridge University Press. ISBN 978-0-521-58354-1.
- Story, Gillian (1966). A Morphological Study of Tlingit (PDF) (Master's thesis). London: University of London.
