= John Kinsel =

American World War II veteran (1917–2024)

- Born: 22 January 1917; Cove, Arizona, United States
- Died: 19 October 2024 (aged 107)
- Allegiance: United States
- Service years: 1942-1946
- Conflicts: World War 2; Battle of Iwo Jima

John Kinsel (January 22, 1917 – October 19, 2024) was an American World War 2 veteran who was part of Navajo Code Talkers. He died on October 19, 2024, at the age of 107.

Born in Cove, Arizona, Kinsel graduated from high school and enlisted in the United States Marine Corps in 1942. As an elite Code Talker, he served with the 9th Marine Regiment in the 3rd Marine Division during the Battle of Iwo Jima.
