= Fleming Begaye Sr. =

Navajo code talker during World War II (1921–2019)

Fleming Begaye Sr. (August 26, 1921 – May 10, 2019) was a Navajo code talker during World War II. He was born in Red Valley, Arizona, was a member of the Navajo Nation, and attended Fort Wingate boarding school. When he learned that the US military was searching for recruits who could speak Navajo, he enlisted. He became one of over 400 code talkers in the Marines. The code talkers helped to create top-secret coded messages which helped gain victory for the allies in the Pacific theater of the war. Although the Japanese deciphered other codes, they never broke the Navajo code. Begaye served as a code talker from 1943 until 1945. He fought in the Battle of Tarawa and the Battle of Tinian. He later spent one year in a naval hospital treated for injuries he sustained during his time as a marine. After his service he opened a trading post called Begaye's Corner in Chinle, Arizona. the post later grew into a gas station, car repair shop, cafe and small grocery store. He later worked as a farmer and grew apple, cherry and plum trees. He also raised cattle and sheep.

He was named the Honorary Chair of the Native American Coalition of the Donald J. Trump for President Campaign. In 2017 President Donald Trump honored Begaye during a White House ceremony.

Begaye was married to Helen, who died in 2008. They had three children. He died on May 10, 2019, at the age of 97: at the time of his death, only seven other Navajo code talkers remained. He was buried on May 17, 2019.
