= Alfred K. Newman =

World War II Navajo code talker (1924–2019)

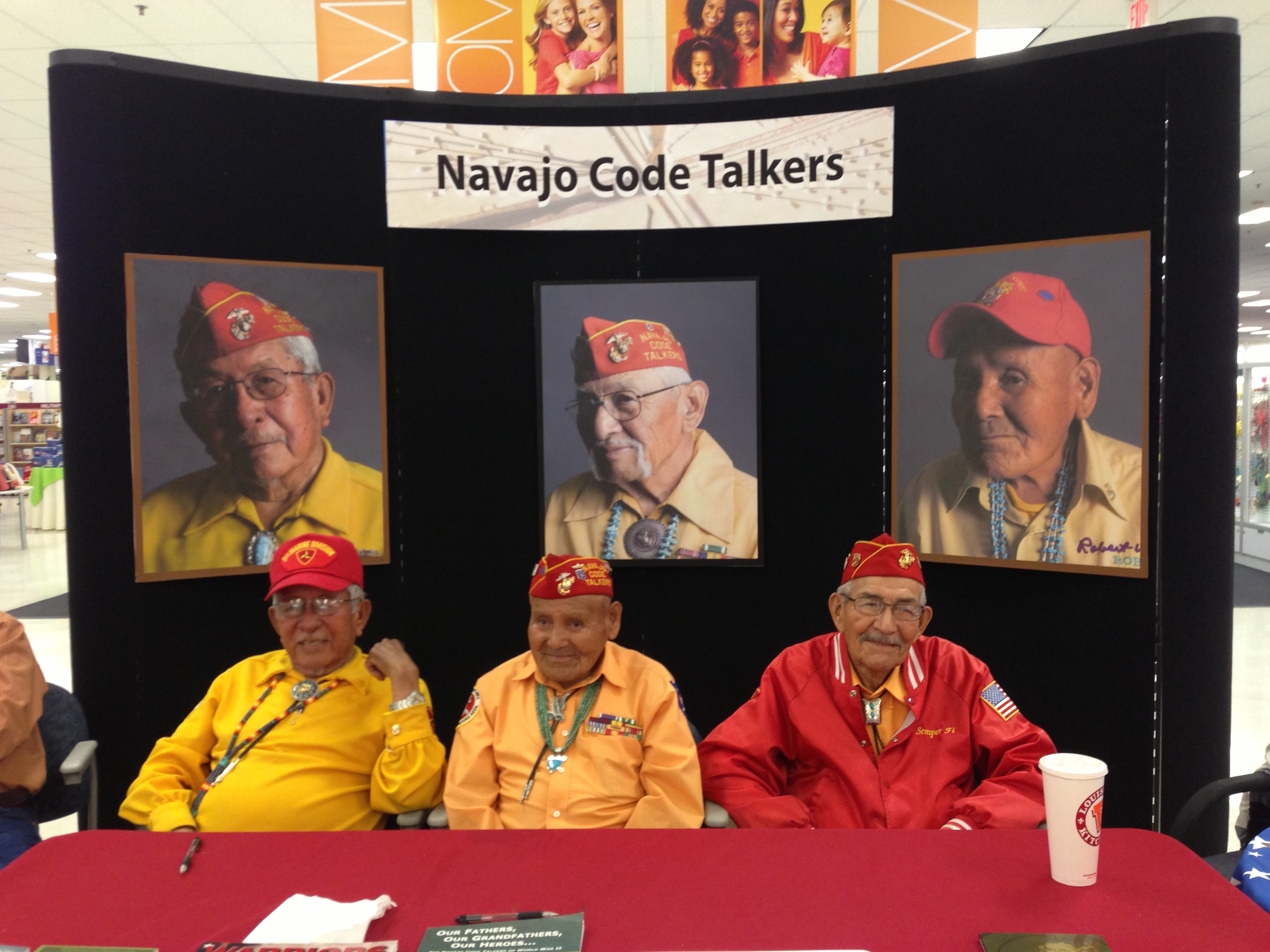
- Alfred K. Newman (right) in 2013
- Born: July 7, 1924; Rehoboth, New Mexico
- Died: January 13, 2019 (aged 94); Albuquerque
- Spouse: Betsy Eleanor
- Children: 5
- Military career
- Allegiance: United States
- Branch: Marines
- Service years: November 1943-December 1945
- Rank: Corporal
- Conflicts: World War II
- Other work: Ammunition inspector

Alfred K. Newman (July 7, 1924 – January 13, 2019) was a United States Marine, best known for serving as a Navajo code talker during World War II.

Born in Rehoboth, New Mexico, on the Navajo Nation, Newman and his fellow native students were not allowed to speak the Navajo language in school. With the attack on Pearl Harbor in mind, he joined the Marine Corps on March 26, 1943, and became one of over 400 code talkers.

In November 1943, Newman was part of the Guadalcanal Campaign, before he spent a month on Bougainville Island. He then went with the 3rd Division to Guam, before ultimately landing for the end of the Battle of Iwo Jima. Newman was honorably discharged with the rank of corporal in December 1945, and he worked as an ammunition inspector at Fort Wingate and later at an open-pit mine overseeing blasting at Kirtland Field.

Newman was married to Betsy Eleanor, his wife of 69 years. They had five children. He died at age 94 at the veterans hospital in Albuquerque. His death puts the number of code talkers still living at around 10.
