= Navajo phonology =

Language sound system

This article is about the sound system of the Navajo language. The phonology of Navajo is intimately connected to its morphology. For example, the entire range of contrastive consonants is found only at the beginning of word stems. In stem-final position and in prefixes, the number of contrasts is drastically reduced. Similarly, vowel contrasts (including their prosodic combinatory possibilities) found outside of the stem are significantly neutralized. For details about the morphology of Navajo, see Navajo grammar.

Like most Athabaskan languages, Navajo is coronal heavy, having many phonological contrasts at coronal places of articulation and less at other places. Also typical of the family, Navajo has a limited number of labial sounds, both in terms of its phonemic inventory and in their occurrence in actual lexical items and displays of consonant harmony.

== Consonants ==
The consonant phonemes of Navajo are listed below.

Consonants
		Bilabial	Alveolar			Palato- alveolar	Palatal	Velar		Glottal	
		Bilabial	plain	lateral	sib.	Palato- alveolar	Palatal	plain	labial.	plain	labial.
Plosive/ Affricate	tenuis	p	t	tˡ	ts	tʃ		k		ʔ	
Plosive/ Affricate	aspirated		tʰ	tɬʰ	tsʰ	tʃʰ		kʰ	(kʷʰ)		
Plosive/ Affricate	ejective		tʼ	tɬʼ	tsʼ	tʃʼ		kʼ			
Continuant	fortis			ɬ	s	ʃ		x	(xʷ)	(h)	(hʷ)
Continuant	lenis			l	z	ʒ	j ~ ʝ	ɣ ~ ɰ	(ɣʷ)		
Sonorant	plain	m	n	l			j ~ ʝ	ɣ ~ ɰ	(ɣʷ)		
Sonorant	glottalized	(mˀ)	(nˀ)				(jˀ)		(wˀ)		

=== Phonetics ===
All consonants are long, compared to English: with plain stops the hold is longer, with aspirated stops the aspiration is longer, and with affricates the frication is longer. The voice onset time of the aspirated and ejective stops is twice as long as that found in most non-Athabaskan languages. Young & Morgan (1987) described Navajo consonants as "doubled" between vowels, but in fact they are equally long in all positions.

Stops and affricates

All stops and affricates, except for the bilabial and glottal, have a three-way laryngeal contrast between unaspirated, aspirated, and ejective. The labial /m/ is found in only a few words. Most of the contrasts in the inventory lie within coronal territory at the alveolar and palatoalveolar places of articulation.

The aspirated stops /tʰ, kʰ/ (orthographic ⟨t⟩, ⟨k⟩) are typically aspirated with velar frication [tx, kx] (they are phonetically affricates – homorganic in the case of [kx], heterorganic in the case of [tx]). The velar aspiration is also found on a labialized velar [kxʷ] (orthographic ⟨kw⟩). There is variation within Navajo, however, in this respect: some dialects lack strong velar frication, having instead a period of aspiration.

Similarly, the unaspirated velar /k/ (orthographic ⟨g⟩) is realized with optional voiced velar frication following the stop burst: [k] ~ [kɣ]. The unaspirated lateral /tɬ/ (orthographic ⟨dl⟩) typically has a voiced lateral release, [tˡ], of a duration comparable to the release of the /k/ and much shorter than the unaspirated affricates /ts/, /tʃ/. However, the aspirated and ejective laterals are true affricates.

While the aspiration of stops is markedly long compared to most other languages, the aspiration of the affricates is quite short: the main feature distinguishing /ts/, /tʃ/ from /tsʰ/, /tʃʰ/ is that the frication is half again as long in the latter: [tsˑʰ], [tʃʰˑ]. /tɬʰ/ is similarly long, [tɬˑʰ]. The ejectives /tsʼ/, /tɬʼ/, /tʃʼ/, on the other hand, have short frication, presumably due to the lack of pulmonic airflow. There is a period of near silence before the glottalized onset of the vowel. In /tɬʼ/ there may be a double glottal release, or a creaky onset to the vowel not found in the other ejective affricates.

Continuants

Navajo voiceless continuants are realized as fricatives. They are typically noisier than the fricatives that occur in English. The palato-alveolars /ʃ, ʒ/ are not labialized unlike English and other European languages.

Navajo also does not have consistent phonetic voicing in the "voiced" continuant members. Although /z, l, ʒ, ɣ/ are described as voiced in impressionist descriptions, data from spectrograms shows that they may be partially devoiced during the constriction. In stem-initial position, /l/ tends to be fully voiced, /ʒ/ has a slight tendency to be voiceless near the offset, /z/ is often mostly voiceless with phonetic voicing only at the onset, /ɣ/ is also only partially voiced with voicing at onset. A more consistent acoustic correlate of the "voicing" is the duration of the consonant: "voiceless" consonants have longer durations than "voiced" consonants. Based on this, McDonough (2003) argues that the distinction is better captured with the notion of a fortis/lenis contrast. A further characteristic of voicing in Navajo is that it is marginally contrastive (see the voicing assimilation section).

Navajo lacks a clear distinction between phonetic fricatives and approximants. Although the pair [ɬ]~[l] has been described as a fricative and an approximant, respectively, the lack of a consistent contrast between the two phonetic categories and a similar patterning with other fricative pairs suggests that they are better described as continuants. Additionally, observations have been made about the less fricative-like nature of [ɣ, ɣʷ] and the more fricative-like nature of [j].

Sonorants

A more abstract analysis of Navajo posits two different /j/ phonemes (see below for elaboration).

The glottalized sonorants are the result of d-effect on the non-glottalized counterparts. A strict structuralist analysis, such as that of Hoijer (1945a) and Sapir & Hoijer (1967), considers them phonemic.

Glottal(ized) consonants

Consonants involving a glottal closure – the glottal stop, ejective stops, and the glottalized sonorants – may have optional creaky voice on voiced sounds adjacent to the glottal gesture. Glottal stops may also be realized entirely as creaky voice instead of single glottal closure. Ejectives in Navajo differ from the ejectives in many other languages in that the glottal closure is not released near-simultaneously with the release of the oral closure (as is common in other languages) – it is held for a significant amount of time following oral release. The glottalized sonorants /mˀ, nˀ/ are articulated with a glottal stop preceding the oral closure with optional creaky voice during the oral closure: [ʔm – ʔm̰, ʔn – ʔn̰].

Labialized consonants

Consonants /kʰʷ, xʷ, ɣʷ/ are predictable variants that occur before the rounded oral vowel /o/. However, these sounds also occur before the vowels /i, e, a/ where they contrast with their non-labialized counterparts /kʰ, x, ɣ/.

=== Velar /ɣ/, palatal /j/ ===
The phonological contrast between the velar obstruent /ɣ/ and the palatal glide /j/ is neutralized in certain contexts. However, in these contexts, they may often be distinguished from each other by their different phonological patterning.

Before the rounded /o/, /ɣ/ is phonetically strongly labialized as [ɣʷ]; elsewhere, it lacks the labialization. As noted above, the lenis continuants like /ɣ/ are often very weak fricatives somewhere between a typical fricative constriction (e.g. [ɣ]) and a more open approximant constriction (e.g. [ɰ]) – this will be symbolized here as [ɰ̝]. Hoijer (1945a) describes the [ɰ̝ʷ] realization as being similar to English [w] but differing in having slight frication at the beginning of the articulation. The realization before /a/ varies between an approximant [ɰ] and a weakly fricated approximant [ɰ̝]. The following verb stem has different velar allophones of the stem-initial consonant:

Word	Underlying	Phonetic	! Gloss
-ghash	/ɣàʃ/	[ɰ̝àʃ]	'make bubbling noise' (iterative, continuative)
-wosh	/ɣòʃ/	[ɰ̝ʷòʃ]	'make bubbling noise' (iterative, repetitive)

The palatal glide /j/ is also phonetically between an approximant [j] and a fricative [ʝ]. Hoijer (1945a) compares it to English [j] with a "slight but audible 'rubbiness' or frication."

The contrast between velar /ɣ/ and palatal /j/ is found before both back vowels /a, o/ as the following contrasts demonstrate:

	Word	Underlying	Phonetic	Gloss
contrast before /a/	bighaaʼ	/pìɣàːʔ/	[pɪ̀ɰ̝àːʔ]	'its fur'
contrast before /a/	biyaaʼ	/pìjàːʔ/	[pɪ̀j˔àːʔ]	'its lice'
contrast before /o/	biwol	/pìɣòl/	[pɪ̀ɰ̝ʷòl]	'its marrow'
contrast before /o/	biyol	/pìjòl/	[pɪ̀j˔òl]	'its breath'

Before the front vowels /i, e/, however, the contrast between /ɣ/ and /j/ is neutralized to a palatal articulation much like the weakly fricative [j˔] realization of /j/ that occurs before back vowels. However, the underlying consonant can be ascertained in verb stems and noun stems via their different realizations in a voiceless (i.e. fortis) context. The underlying velar surfaces as a voiceless palatal fricative [ç] in these environments:

Fortis context			Lenis context		
Word	Phonetic	Gloss	Word	Phonetic	Gloss
hééł	[çéːɬ]	'bundle'	biyéél	[pɪ̀j˔éːl]	'her bundle'
yishhizh	[j˔ɪ̀ʃçɪ̀ʒ]	'I pick (corn)'	yiyizh	[j˔ɪ̀j˔ɪ̀ʒ]	'she picks (corn)'

The stem-initial velar of the noun stem /xéːɬ/ has a voiceless fortis realization of [ç] (as [çéːɬ]) when word-initial. When intervocalic, it is realized as lenis [j˔] (as [-j˔éːl]). Likewise, the underlying velar of the verb stem /xɪ̀ʒ/ is a voiceless [ç] after the preceding voiceless [ʃ] and lenis [j˔] when intervocalic. Thus, the alternation of [ç ~ j˔] in the two contexts is indicative of an underlying velar consonant. Similarly, before the back vowels, the velar continuant has the alternations [x ~ ɰ̝] and [xʷ ~ ɰ̝ʷ], as shown in the examples below:

	Fortis context			Lenis context		
	Word	Phonetic	Gloss	Word	Phonetic	Gloss
before /a/	haníłháásh	[hànɪ́ɬxáːʃ]	'you make it boil'	hanílgháásh	[hànɪ́lɰ̝áːʃ]	'it comes to a boil'
before /o/	ałhosh	[ʔàɬxʷòʃ]	'he's sleeping'	áhodilwosh	[ʔáhòtɪ̀lɰ̝ʷòʃ]	'he's pretending to be asleep'

An underlying palatal /j/ can be determined by alternations which differ from the velar alternations. However, /j/ has two different alternation patterns, which have led to the positing of two distinct phonemes. Incidentally, the two different phonemes are also connected to two different reconstructed consonants in Proto-Athabascan. One of these /j/ phonemes is considered an obstruent as it has a fricative realization of [s] in fortis contexts. It is often symbolized as a palatalized (or front velar) fricative /ɣ̑/ (in Americanist phonetic notation) and is a reflex of Proto-Athabascan *x̯. It may be considered coronal because of its coronal voiceless allophone.

	Fortis context			Lenis context		
	Word	Phonetic	Gloss	Word	Phonetic	Gloss
before /i/	sin	[sɪ̀n]	'song'	biyiin	[pɪ̀j˔ìːn]	'her song'
before /a/	honissą́	[hònɪ̀sːã́]	'I'm wise'	hóyą́	[hój˔ã́]	'she's wise'
before /o/	hanisóód	[hànɪ̀sːóːt]	'I drive them out'	hainiyóód	[hàɪ̀nɪ̀j˔óːt]	'she drives them out'

In the above examples, the fortis realization is [s] in the stems [sɪ̀n], [-sã́], [-sóːt], while the lenis realization is the glide [j˔] in the corresponding [-j˔ɪ̀n], [-j˔ã́], [-j˔óːt]. Since the fortis reflex of this phoneme is [s], there is also a neutralization between this /j/ phoneme and the alveolar /s/ phoneme. The alveolar phoneme has a [s ~ z] alternation in fortis-lenis contexts:

Fortis context			Lenis context		
Word	Phonetic	Gloss	Word	Phonetic	Gloss
séí	[séɪ́]	'sand'	bizéí	[pɪ̀zéɪ́]	'her sand'

Thus, the different alternations also distinguish between underlying /j/ and underlying /s/.

The other underlying (or morphophonemic) palatal /j/ is considered a sonorant and has an invariant [j˔] realization in both fortis (voiceless) and lenis (voiced) contexts. This phoneme is relatively rare, occurring in only a few morphemes. It is a reflex of Proto-Athabascan *y (as symbolized in Americanist notation). Two examples are below:

	Fortis context			Lenis context		
	Word	Phonetic	Gloss	Word	Phonetic	Gloss
before /a/	yaaʼ	[j˔àːʔ]	'louse'	shiyaʼ	[ʃɪ̀j˔àʔ]	'my louse'
before /o/	honishyóí	[hònɪ̀ʃj˔óɪ́]	'I'm energetic'	honíyóí	[hònɪ́j˔óɪ́]	'you're energetic'

A further distinction between the different phonemes is found in the context of d-effect.

The varying contextual realizations of these three underlying segments are summarized in the following table:

Underlying segment	Lenis			Fortis	D-effect
Underlying segment	before /a/	before /o/	before /i, e/	Fortis	D-effect
/ɣ/	ɰ̝	ɰ̝ʷ	j˔	x	k
/j/ < Proto-Ath. *x̯	j˔	j˔	j˔	s	ts
/j/ < Proto-Ath. *y	j˔	j˔	j˔	j˔	jˀ˔

=== Voicing assimilation ===
The voiced continuants /z, l, ʒ, ɰ̝/ at the beginning of stems vary with their voiceless counterparts /s, ɬ, ʃ, x/, respectively. The voiceless variants occur when preceded by voiceless consonants, such as /s, ɬ, ʃ, h/ while the voiced variants occur between voiced sounds (typically intervocalically). For example, the verb stems meaning 'spit it out', 'be burning', 'spit', and 'be ticklish' have the following forms with alternating voiced and voiceless stem-initial consonants:

Phonetic forms	Orthographic forms	Gloss
[zóːh ~ sóːh]	-zóóh ~ -sóóh	'spit it out'
[lɪ̀t ~ ɬɪ̀t]	-lid ~ -łid	'be burning'
[ʒàh ~ ʃàh]	-zhah ~ -shah	'spit'
[ɰ̝ʷòʒ ~ xʷòʒ]	-wozh ~ -hozh	'be ticklish'

Since the voicing is predictable, it can be represented more abstractly as an underlying consonant that is underspecified with respect to voicing. These archiphonemes can be indicated with the capital letters /Z, L, Ʒ, Ɣ/. The variant voicing of the stem-initial consonant can be found in the context of subject person prefixes which are added to the verb stem:

Phonetic form	Orthographic form	Underlying segments	Gloss
[hàɪ̀tɪ̀zóːh]	haidizóóh	hàìtì-∅-Zóːh	'he spits it out'
[hàtɪ̀sóːh]	hadisóóh	hàtì-ʃ-Zóːh	'I spit it out'
[hàtòhsóːh]	hadohsóóh	hàtì-oh-Zóːh	'you two spit it out'
[tɪ̀lɪ̀t]	dilid	tì-∅-Lìt	'he's burning'
[tɪ̀ʃɬɪ̀t]	dishłid	tì-ʃ-Lìt	'I'm burning'
[tòhɬɪ̀t]	dohłid	tì-oh-Lìt	'you two are burning'
[tɪ̀ʒàh]	dizhah	tì-∅-Ʒàh	'he spits'
[tɪ̀ʃàh]	dishah	tì-ʃ-Ʒàh	'I spit'
[tòhʃàh]	dohshah	tì-oh-Ʒàh	'you two spit'
[jɪ̀ɰ̝ʷòʒ]	yiwozh	∅-Ɣòʒ	'he's ticklish'
[jɪ̀ʃxʷòʒ]	yishhozh	∅-ʃ-Ɣòʒ	'I'm ticklish'
[wòhxʷòʒ]	wohhozh	∅-oh-Ɣòʒ	'you two are ticklish'

As the above examples show, the stem-initial consonant is voiced when intervocalic and voiceless when it is preceded by a voiceless /ʃ-/ sh- first person singular subject prefix or a voiceless [h] in the /oh-/ oh- two person dual subject prefix.

Another example of contextual voicing of verb-stem-initial consonants occurs when a voiceless /-ɬ-/ -ł- classifier prefix occurs before the stem as in the following:

Phonetic form	Orthographic form	Underlying segments	Gloss
[tìːlzáːs]	diilzáás	tì-Vt-ɬ-Záːs	'we two dribble it along'
[jɪ̀tɪ̀sáːs]	yidisáás	jìtì-ɬ-Záːs	'he dribbles it along'
[tɪ̀sáːs]	disáás	tì-ʃ-ɬ-Záːs	'I dribble it along'
[tòhsáːs]	dohsáás	tì-oh-ɬ-Záːs	'you two dribble it along'

In the verb-form [tìːlzáːs] diilzáás ('we two dribble it along'), the /Z/ occurs between a voiced [l] and the voiced stem vowel [áː]. Thus it is realized as a voiced [z]. Here the /-ɬ-/ classifier is voiced due to the d-effect of the preceding /Vt-/ first person dual subject prefix. In the other verb-forms, the stem-initial /Z/ is preceded by voiceless /-ɬ-/ classifier which results in a voiceless realization of [s]. In the surface verb-forms, the underlying /-ɬ-/ classifier is not pronounced due to a phonotactic restriction on consonant clusters.

The initial consonant of noun stems also display contextual voicing:

Phonetic form	Orthographic form	Underlying segments	Gloss
[sàːt]	saad	sàːt	'language'
[pɪ̀zàːt]	bizaad	pì-sàːt	'his language'
[ɬɪ̀t]	łid	ɬìt	'smoke'
[pɪ̀lɪ̀t]	bilid	pì-ɬìt	'his smoke'
[ʃàːʒ]	shaazh	ʃàːʒ	'callous'
[pɪ̀ʒàːʒ]	bizhaazh	pì-ʃàːʒ	"his callous"
[xʷòʃ]	hosh	xòʃ	"cactus"
[pɪ̀ɰ̝ʷòʃ]	biwosh	pì-xòʃ	"his cactus"

Here an intervocalic context is created by inflecting the nouns saad, łid, shaazh, hosh with a [pɪ̀-] bi- third person prefix which ends in a vowel. In this context, the stem-initial consonant is voiced. When these nouns lack a prefix (in which case the stem-initial consonant is word-initial), the realization is voiceless.

However, in some noun stems, the stem-initial continuant does not voice when intervocalic: [ʔàʃĩ̀ːh] ashįįh ('salt').

=== Dorsal place assimilation ===
The dorsal consonants /k, kʰ, kʼ, x, ɣ/ (written ⟨g⟩, ⟨k⟩, ⟨kʼ⟩, ⟨h⟩, ⟨gh⟩) have contextual phonetic variants (i.e. allophones) varying along place of articulation that depend on the following vowel environment. They are realized as palatals before the front vowels ⟨i⟩ and ⟨e⟩ and as velars before the back vowels ⟨a⟩ and ⟨o⟩. Additionally, they are labialized before the rounded back vowel ⟨o⟩. This likewise happens with the velar frication of the aspirated /tʰ/.

Phoneme	Allophones		
Phoneme	Palatal	Velar	Labial
k	[c(ʝ)]	[k(ɣ)]	[k(ɣ)ʷ]
kʰ	[cç]	[kx]	[kxʷ]
kʼ	[cʼ]	[kʼ]	[kʼʷ]
x	[ç]	[x]	[xʷ]
ɣ	[j˔]	[ɰ̝]	[ɰ̝ʷ]
tʰ	[tç]	[tx]	[txʷ]

=== Coronal harmony ===
Navajo has coronal sibilant consonant harmony. Alveolar sibilants in prefixes assimilate to post-alveolar sibilants in stems, and post-alveolar prefixal sibilants assimilate to alveolar stem sibilants. For example, the si- stative perfective is realized as si- or shi- depending upon whether the stem contains a post-alveolar sibilant. For example, while sido ('it is hot' perfective) has the first form, shibeezh ('it is boiled' perfective), the stem-final /ʒ/ triggers the change to /ʃ/.

=== D-effect ===
A particular type of morphophonemic alternation (or mutation) in Athabascan languages called d-effect is found in Navajo. In most cases, the alternation is a fortition (or strengthening) process. The initial consonant of a verb stem alternates with a strengthened consonant when it is preceded by a /-t-/ (orthographic ⟨-d-⟩) "classifier" prefix or the /-Vt-/ first person dual subject prefix. The underlying /t/ of these prefixes is absorbed into the following stem. D-effect can be viewed prosodically as the result of a phonotactic constraint on consonant clusters that would otherwise result from the concatenation of underlying segments. There is thus an interaction between a requirement for the grammatical information to be expressed in the surface form and an avoidance of having sequences of consonants (see the syllable section for more on phonotactics).

The fortition is typically a change from continuant to affricate or continuant to stop (i.e., adding a period of closure to the articulation). However, other changes involve glottalization of the initial consonant:

Prefix consonant + Stem-initial consonant		Surface consonant	Example
t- + -Z	→	-ts	/tʃʼéná-t-Zìt/ → [tʃʼéná-tsìt] chʼénádzid ('he woke up')
/t- + -L	→	/-tl	/ʔánéìnì-t-Laː/ → [ʔánéìnì-tlaː] ánéinidlaa ('you repaired it')
/t- + -Ʒ	→	/-tʃ	/ʔákʼídíní-t-Ʒéːʔ/ → [ʔákʼítíní-tʃéːʔ] ákʼídíníjééʼ ('you spit on yourself')
/t- + -j	→	/-ts	/nìː-Vt-jòɬ/ → [nìː-tsòɬ] niidzoł ('we two are driving them along') (cf. /jìnòː-jòɬ/ yinooyoł 'he is driving them along')
/t- + -Ɣ	→	/-k	/jì-Vt-Ɣòʒ/ → [jìː-kòʒ] yiigozh ('we two are ticklish') (cf. /jì-ɣòʒ/ yiwozh 'he is ticklish')
/t- + -ʔ	→	/-tʼ	/nànìʃ-t-ʔìn/ → [nànìʃ-tʼìn] nanishtʼin ('I am hidden')
/t- + -m	→	/-mʼ	/jì-Vt-màs/ → [jìː-mʼàs] yiiʼmas ('we two are rolling along') (cf. /jì-màs/ yimas 'he is rolling along')
/t- + -n	→	/-nʼ	/náːtòː-t-nìːt/ → [náːtòː-nʼìːt] náádooʼniid ('she said again')
/t- + -j	→	/-jʼ	/xònì-Vt-jóí/ → [xònìː-jʼóí] honiiʼyóí ('we two are energetic') (cf. /xònìʃ-jʼóí/ honishyóí 'I am energetic')

The two occurrences of t- + -j in the chart above reflect two different patterns of d-effect involving stem-initial /j/. Often different underlying consonants are posited to explain the different alternation. The first alternation is posited as a result of underlying t- + -ɣ leading to a d-effect mutation of /dz/. The other is t- + -j resulting in /jˀ/. (See the velar /ɣ/, palatal /j/ section for further explanation.)

Another example of d-effect influences not the stem-initial consonant but the classifier prefix. When the /-Vt-/ first person dual subject prefix precedes the /-ɬ-/ (orthographic ⟨-ł-⟩) classifier prefix, the /-ɬ-/ classifier is realized as voiced [l]:

Prefix consonant + Classifier consonant		Surface consonant	Example
t- + -ɬ-	→	-l-	/jì-Vt-ɬ-Ʒõ̀ːh/ → [jìː-l-ʒõ̀ːh] yiilzhǫǫh ('we two tame it')

=== Other ===
- n > high tone
- expressive x clusters

== Vowels ==
Navajo has four contrastive vowel qualities /i, e, o, ɑ/ at three different vowel heights (close, mid, open) and a front-back contrast between the mid vowels /e, o/. There are also two contrastive vowel lengths and a contrast in nasalization. This results in 16 phonemic vowels, shown below.

Oral, Long
	Front	Back
Close	iː	
Mid	eː	oː
Open		ɑː

Oral, Short
	Front	Back
Close	ɪ	
Mid	ɛ	ɔ ~ ɞ
Open		ɑ

Nasal, Long
	Front	Back
Close	ĩː	
Mid	ẽː	õː
Open		ɑ̃ː

Nasal, Short
	Front	Back
Close	ĩ	
Mid	ẽ	õ
Open		ɑ̃

There is a phonetic vowel quality difference between the long high vowel /iː/ (orthographic ⟨ii⟩) and the short high vowel /i/ (orthographic ⟨i⟩): the shorter vowel is significantly lower at [ɪ] than its long counterpart. The phonetic difference between /iː/ and /i/ but not the other long-short pairs is salient to native speakers, who will consider a short vowel at a higher position to be a mispronunciation. Short /e/ is pronounced [ɛ]. Short /o/ is a bit more variable and more centralized, covering the space [ɔ] ~ [ɞ]. Notably, the variation in /o/ does not approach [u], which is a true gap in the vowel space.

Although the nasalization is contrastive in the surface phonology, many instances of nasalized vowels can be derived from a sequence of Vowel + Nasal consonant in a more abstract analysis. Additionally, there are alternations between long and short vowels that are predictable.

There have been a number of somewhat different descriptions of Navajo vowels, which are conveniently summarized in McDonough (2003).

=== Acoustic phonetics ===
McDonough (2003) has acoustic measurements of the formants of Navajo long and short oral vowel pairs as pronounced by 10 female and 4 male native speakers. An earlier study (McDonough, Ladefoged & George (1993)) has measurements from 7 female speakers.

Below are the median values of the first (F1) and second (F2) formants for these studies:

McDonough (2003)
Vowel	F1	F2	Vowel	F1	F2
iː	372	2532	oː	513	957
i	463	2057	o	537	1154
eː	487	2195	ɑː	752	1309
e	633	1882	ɑ	696	1454

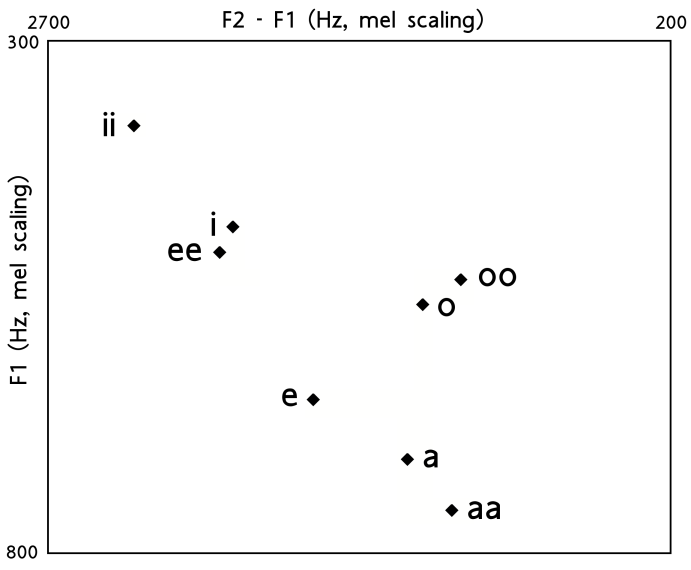
F1 vs F2-F1 in Hz with mel scaling.

McDonough, Ladefoged & George (1993)
Vowel	F1	F2	Vowel	F1	F2
iː	315	2528	oː	488	943
i	391	2069	o	558	1176
eː	498	2200	ɑː	802	1279
e	619	2017	ɑ	808	1299

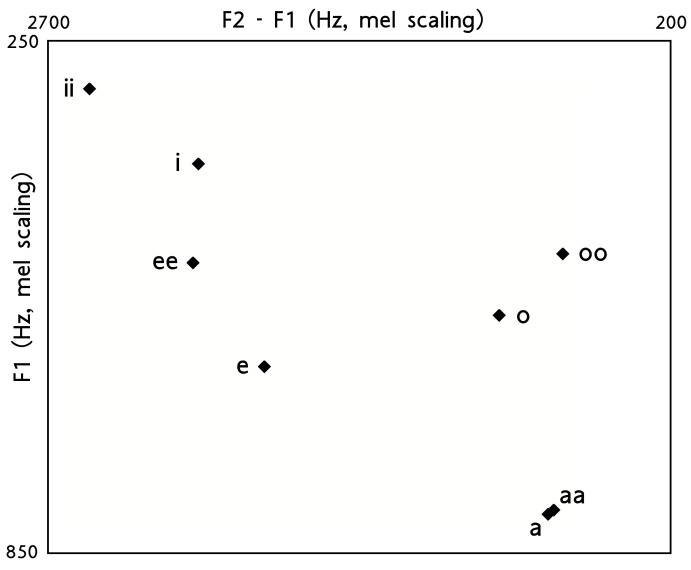
F1 vs F2-F1 in Hz with mel scaling.

== Tones ==
Navajo has two tones: high and low. Orthographically, high tone is marked with an acute accent ⟨á⟩ over the affected vowel, while low tone is left unmarked ⟨a⟩. This reflects the tonal polarity of Navajo, as syllables have low tone by default.

Long vowels normally have level tones ⟨áá, aa⟩. However, in grammatical contractions and in Spanish loan words such as béeso ('money' from Spanish peso), long vowels may have falling ⟨áa⟩ or rising ⟨aá⟩ tones.

The sonorant /n/ also carries tone when it is syllabic. Here again, the high tone is marked with an acute ⟨ń⟩ while the low tone is left unmarked ⟨n⟩.

Even though low tone is the default, these syllables are not underspecified for tone: they have a distinct phonetic tone, and their pitch is not merely a function of their environment. This contrasts with the related Carrier language. As in many languages, however, the pitches at the beginnings of Navajo vowels are lower after voiced consonants than after tenuis and aspirated consonants. After ejective consonants, only high tones are lowered, so that the distinction between high and low tone is reduced. However, the type of consonant has little effect on the pitch in the middle of the vowel, so that vowels have characteristic rising pitches after voiced consonants.

The pitch of a vowel is also affected by the tone of the previous syllable: in most cases, this has as great an effect on the pitch of a syllable as its own tone. However, this effect is effectively blocked by an intervening aspirated consonant.

=== Tonological processes ===
Navajo nouns are simple: /kʰṍ/ [kʰṍ] kǫ́ ('fire'), /pi-tiɬ/ [pìtìɬ] bidił ('his blood'). Most long nouns are actually deverbal.

In verbs, with few exceptions, only stems may carry a high tone: C V(ː)(C)(T). Prefixes are mostly single consonants, C-, and do not carry tone. The one exception is the high-tone vocalic prefix /ʌ́n/-. Most other tone-bearing units in the Navajo verb are second stems or clitics.

All Navajo verbs can be analyzed as compounds, and this greatly simplifies the description of tone. There are two obligatory components, the "I" stem (for "inflection") and the "V" stem (for "verb"), each potentially bearing a high tone, and each preceded by its own prefixes. In addition, the compound as a whole takes 'agreement' prefixes like the prefixes found on nouns. This entire word may then take proclitics, which may also carry tone:

clitics=	agreement–	(prefixes–	I-stem)	+	(prefixes–	V-stem)
tone			tone			tone

(Hyphens "–" mark prefixes, double hyphens "=" mark clitics, and plus signs "+" join compounds.)

Any high tones on clitics spread to the next syllable of the word only if it is short and located immediately before the verbal stem. This can be seen with the iterative clitic /ná/꞊. Compare

ha=ni-sh+ł-chaad
hanishchaad
'I card it (wool)'

and

ha=ná=ni-sh+ł-chaʼ
hanáníshchaʼ
'I usually card it (wool)'

where the clitic ná= creates a high tone on the following short pre-stem syllable in bold, but,

ha=ná=ni-iid+ł-chaʼ
hanániichaʼ
'we usually card it (wool)'

and

ha=ná=da=ni-oh+ł-chaʼ
hanídanołchaʼ
'you (pl) usually card it (wool)'

where it does not.

- conjunct prefixes in verb stems are unmarked for tone (with a few exceptions) – they assimilate to the tones of neighboring prefixes
- tones in disjunct prefixes and stems are underlying specified
- certain enclitics (like the subordinator ⟨=go⟩) affect the tones of preceding verb stems

== Syllable ==
Stems. The stems (e.g. noun stems, verb stems, etc.) have the following syllable types:

C V(ː)(T)(C)

That is, all syllables must have a consonant onset C, a vowel nucleus V. The syllable may carry a high tone T, the vowel nucleus may be short or long, and there may optionally be a consonant coda.

Prefixes. Prefixes typically have a syllable structure of CV-, such as chʼí- ('out horizontally'). Exceptions to this are certain verbal prefixes, such as the classifiers (-ł-, -l-, -d-) that occur directly before the verb stem, which consist of a single consonant -C-. A few other verbal prefixes, such as naa- ('around') on the outer left edge of the verb have long vowels, CVV-. A few prefixes have more complex syllable shapes, such as hashtʼe- ('ready') (CVCCV-). Prefixes do not carry tone.

Some analyses, such as that of Harry Hoijer, consider conjunct verbal prefixes to have the syllable shape CV-. In other generative analyses, the same prefixes are considered to have only underlying consonants of the shape C-. Then, in certain environments, an epenthetic vowel (the default vowel is ⟨i⟩) is inserted after the consonantal prefix.

=== Peg elements, segment insertion ===
All verbs must be at least disyllabic. Some verbs may only have a single overt nonsyllabic consonantal prefix, a prefix lacking an onset, or no prefix at all before the verb stem. Since all verbs are required to have two syllables, a meaningless prefix must be added to the verb to fulfill the disyllabic requirement. This prosodic prefix is known as a peg element in Athabascan terminology (Edward Sapir used the term pepet vowel). For example, the verb meaning "she/he/they is/are crying" has the following morphological composition: Ø-Ø-cha, where both the imperfective modal prefix and the third-person subject prefix are phonologically null morphemes and the verb stem is -cha. In order for this verb to be complete, a yi- peg element must be prefixed to the verb stem, resulting in the verb form yicha. Other examples are the verb yishcha ('I am crying'), which is morphologically Ø-sh-cha (Ø- null imperfective modal, -sh- first-person singular subject, -cha verb stem) and wohcha ('you [2+] are crying'), which is Ø-oh-cha (Ø- null imperfective modal, -oh- second-person dual-plural subject, -cha verb stem). The glide consonant of the peg element is ⟨y⟩ before ⟨i⟩, ⟨w⟩ before ⟨o⟩, and ⟨gh⟩ before ⟨a⟩.

== Bibliography ==
- Hoijer, Harry (1942), "Phonetic and phonemic change in the Athapaskan languages", Language, 18 (3): 218–20, doi:10.2307/409555, JSTOR 409555
- Hoijer, Harry (1945a), Navaho phonology, University of New Mexico publications in anthropology (No. 1), Albuquerque: The University of New Mexico Press
- Johnson, Keith (2003), Acoustic and Auditory Phonetics (Second ed.), Malden, MA: Blackwell Publishing
- McDonough, Joyce (2003), The Navajo Sound System, Dordrecht: Kluwer Academic Publishers, ISBN 1-4020-1351-5
- McDonough, Joyce; Ladefoged, Peter (1993), "Navajo stops", UCLA Working Papers in Phonetics, 84: 151–64
- McDonough, Joyce; Ladefoged, Peter; George, H. (1993), "Navajo vowels and universal phonetic tendencies", University of California Working Papers in Phonetics, 84: 143–50
- Reichard, Gladys A. (1945), "Linguistic diversity among the Navaho Indians", International Journal of American Linguistics, 11 (3): 156–68, doi:10.1086/463866, S2CID 143774525
- Sapir, Edward; Hoijer, Harry (1967), Phonology and morphology of the Navaho language, Berkeley: University of California Press.
- Speas, Margaret (1990), Phrase Structure in Natural Language, Dordrect: Kluwer Academic Publishers
- Speas, Margaret (1985), "Navajo Prefixes and Word Structure Typology", MIT Working Papers in Linguistics, 6, Cambridge: 86–111
- Wright, Martha (1983), "The CV Skeleton and Verb Prefix Phonology in Navajo", Proceedings of NELS 14, Amherst
- Young, Robert W.; Morgan, William Sr. (1987), The Navajo language: A grammar and colloquial dictionary (rev. ed.), Albuquerque: University of New Mexico Press, ISBN 0-8263-1014-1
