= Checker Tomkins =

Canadian Métis code talker

Charles "Checker" Tomkins (January 8, 1918 – August 20, 2003) was a Canadian Métis code talker.

Born in Grouard, Alberta, Tomkins was a fluent speaker of the Cree language. Shortly after marrying Lena Anderson in 1940, he enlisted in the armed forces and was shipped overseas during the Second World War. He helped develop a Cree-language code to report aircraft sightings. After the war, he re-enlisted and served in a number of different regiments for 25 years, eventually being promoted to corporal.

For his wartime service, he was awarded the Defence Medal, the 1939–1945 Star, the France and Germany Star, the Canadian Volunteer Service Medal, and the War Medal 1939–1945. He was also the subject of a short documentary produced by directed by Cowboy Smithx.
