= Navajo grammar =

Grammar of the Navajo language

Navajo is a "verb-heavy" language – it has a great preponderance of verbs but relatively few nouns. In addition to verbs and nouns, Navajo has other elements such as pronouns, clitics of various functions, demonstratives, numerals, postpositions, adverbs, and conjunctions, among others. Harry Hoijer grouped all of the above into a word-class he called particles (i.e., Navajo would then have verbs, nouns, and particles). Navajo has no words that would correspond to adjectives in English grammar: verbs provide the adjectival functionality.

== Verbs ==
The key element in Navajo is the verb. Verbs are composed of an abstract stem to which inflectional or derivational prefixes are added. Every verb must have at least one prefix. The prefixes are affixed to the verb in a specified order.

The Navajo verb can be sectioned into different components. The verb stem is composed of an abstract root and an often fused suffix. The stem together with a "classifier" prefix (and sometimes other thematic prefixes) make up the verb theme. The thematic prefixes are prefixes that are non-productive, have limited derivational function, and no longer have a clearly defined meaning. Examples of thematic prefixes include the archaic yá- prefix, which only occurs on the verb stem -tééh/-tiʼ meaning "to talk" as in yáłtiʼ "he's talking". The theme is then combined with derivational prefixes that in turn make up the verb base. Finally, inflectional prefixes (which Young & Morgan call "paradigmatic prefixes") are affixed to the base – producing a complete Navajo verb.

=== Verb template ===
The prefixes that occur on a Navajo verb are added in specified more or less rigid order according to prefix type. This type of morphology is called a position class template (or slot-and-filler template). Below is a table of a recent proposal of the Navajo verb template (Young & Morgan 1987). A given verb does not have a prefix for every position. In fact, most Navajo verbs are not as complex as the template might suggest: the maximum number of prefixes is around eight.

The Navajo verb is composed of a verb stem and a set of prefixes. The prefixes can be divided into a conjunct prefix set and disjunct prefix set. The disjunct prefixes occur on the outer left edge of the verb. The conjunct prefixes occur after the disjunct prefixes, closer to the verb stem. Two types of prefixes can be distinguished by their different phonological behavior.

Disjunct prefixes	Conjunct prefixes	Stem

The prefix complex may be subdivided into 11 positions, with some of the positions having even further subdivisions:

Disjunct prefixes					Conjunct prefixes						Stem
0	1a	1b	2	3	4	5	6	7	8	9	10
postposition object	"null postposition"	adverbial- thematic	iterative	plural	direct object	deictic	adverbial- thematic	mode- aspect	subject	classifier	stem

Although prefixes are generally found in a specific position, some prefixes change order by the process of metathesis. For example, prefix ʼa- (3i object pronoun) usually occurs before di-, as in:

ʼadisbąąs [ ← ʼa- + di- + sh- + ł + -bąąs]

"I'm starting to drive some kind of wheeled vehicle along"

However, when ʼa- occurs with the prefixes di- and ni-, the ʼa- metathesizes with di-, leading to an order of di- + ʼa- + ni-, as in:

diʼnisbąąs [ ← di-ʼa-ni-sh-ł-bąąs ← ʼa- + di- + ni- + sh- + ł + -bąąs]

"I'm in the act of driving some vehicle (into something) & getting stuck"

instead of the expected *ʼadinisbąąs (ʼa-di-ni-sh-ł-bąąs) (ʼa- is reduced to ʼ-).

Although the verb template model of analysis has been traditionally used to describe the Navajo verb, other analyses have been proposed by Athabascanists.

=== Pronominal inflection ===
Navajo verbs have pronominal (i.e. pronoun) prefixes that mark both subjects and objects. The prefixes can vary in certain modes, particularly the perfective mode (See Modes section below for a discussion of modes). The prefixes are inflected according to person and number. The basic subject prefixes (and their abbreviations as used by Young & Morgan) are listed in the table below:

Number	Subject prefixes		Object prefixes	
Number	Singular	Dual-plural	Singular	Dual-plural
First (1)	-sh-	-Vd-	shi-	nihi-
Second (2)	ni-	-oh-	ni-	nihi-
Third (3)	-∅-		bi-	
Third (3o)	-∅-		yi-	
Fourth (3a)	ji-		ha- ~ ho-	
Indefinite (3i)	ʼa-		ʼa-	
Space (3s)	ha- ~ ho-		ha- ~ ho-	
Reflexive	–		(ʼá)-di-	
Reciprocal	–		ʼahi-	

The subject prefixes occur in two different positions. The first and second subject prefixes (-sh-, -Vd-, ni-, -oh-) occur in position 8 directly before the classifier prefixes. The fourth, indefinite, and "space" subject prefixes (ji-, ʼa-, ha-~ho-) are known as "deictic subject pronouns" and occur in position 5. The third person subject is marked by the absence of a prefix, which is usually indicated with a zero prefix -∅- in position 8. The object prefixes can occur in position 4 as direct objects, in position 1a as "null postpositions", or in position 0 as the object of postpositions that have been incorporated into the verb complex.

The fourth person subject prefix ji- is a kind of obviative third person. It refers primarily to persons or personified animals (unlike the regular third person). It has a number of uses including:

- referring to the main character in narratives
- distinguishing between two third person referents
- referring politely or impersonally to certain socially-distant individuals (e.g. when speaking to opposite-sex siblings and relatives through marriage, giving admonitions, speaking of the dead)

When used as an impersonal, it may be translated into English as "one" as in béésh bee njinéego hálaʼ da jiigish "one can cut one's hand playing with knives". The "space" prefix can be translated as "area, place, space, impersonal it" as in halgai "the area/place is white" and nahałtin "it is raining". The prefix has two forms: ha- and ho- with ho- having derived forms such as hw- and hwi-.

An example paradigm for "to freeze" (imperfective mode) showing the subject prefixes:

	Singular		Dual-plural	
First	yishtin	"I freeze"	yiitin	"we (2+) freeze"
Second	nitin	"you freeze"	wohtin	"you (2+) freeze"
Third	yitin "he/she/it/they freeze"			
Fourth (3a)	jitin "he/she/they freeze"			
Indefinite (3i)	atin "someone/something freezes"			

=== Classifiers (transitivity prefixes) ===
The "classifiers" are prefixes of position 9 (the closest to the verb stem) that affect the transitivity of the verb, in that they are valence and voice markers. Calling them "classifiers" is a misnomer, however, as they do not classify anything and are not related to the classificatory verb stems (which actually do classify nouns; see classificatory verbs below). There are four classifiers:

Classifier	Description	Example
-∅-	The -∅- classifier is the absence of a prefix, which is usually indicated by a null morpheme.	
-ł-	The -ł- classifier is a causative-transitivizing prefix of active verbs. It often can transitivize an intransitive -∅- verb.	yibéézh $\rightarrow$ yiłbéézh yi-∅-béézh {} yi-ł-béézh {"it's boiling"} {} {"he's boiling it"}
-d-	The -d- classifier occurs in most passive, mediopassive, reflexive, and reciprocal verbs that are derived from verbs with a -∅- classifier.	yizéés $\rightarrow$ yidéés yi-∅-zéés {} yi-d-zéés {"he's singeing it"} {} {"it's being singed"}
-l-	The -l- occurs in most passive, mediopassive, reflexive, and reciprocal verbs that are derived from verbs with a -ł- classifier.	néíłtsááh $\rightarrow$ náltsááh ná-yi-ł-tsááh {} ná-l-tsááh {"he's drying it"} {} {"it's being dried"}

Some verbs can occur with all four classifier prefixes:

- siʼą́ "it (a roundish object) lies in position" (-∅-ʼą́)
- haatʼą́ "it (a roundish object) was taken up & out (i.e. extracted)" (-d-ʼą́)
- séłʼą́ "I keep a roundish object in position" (-ł-ʼą́)
- néshʼą́ "I have my head in position" (-l-ʼą́)

In other verbs, the classifiers do not mark transitivity and are considered thematic prefixes that simply are required to occur with certain verb stems.

== Modes, aspects and tenses ==
Navajo has a large number of aspectual, modal, and tense distinctions that are indicated by verb stem alternations (involving vowel and tonal ablaut and suffixation) often in combination with a range of prefixes. These are divided into seven "modes" and approximately twelve aspects and ten subaspects. (Although the term mode is traditionally used, most of the distinctions provided by the modes are in fact aspectual.) Each Navajo verb generally can occur in a number of mode and aspect category combinations.

=== Modes ===
Navajo has the following verb modes:

1. Imperfective – an incomplete action; can be used in past, present, or future time frames
2. Perfective – a complete action; usually signifying the past tense but also applied to future states (e.g. "he will have gone")
3. Progressive – ongoing action; unlike the imperfective, the focus is more on the progression across space or time than incompleteness
4. Future – a prospective action, analogous to the future tense
5. Usitative – a usual or typical action
6. Iterative – a recurrent or repetitive action; often used interchangeably with the usitative
7. Optative – a potential or desired action, similar to the subjunctive mood of Indo-European languages

The modes above may have up to five distinct verb stem forms. The progressive and future modes share the same stem form as do the usitative and iterative modes. The optative mode usually has the same verb stem as the imperfective mode, although for some verbs the stem forms differ (in the example "to play, tease" below, the perfective and the optative stems are the same). For example, the verb meaning "to play, tease" has the following five stem forms for the seven modes:

Mode	Stem form
Imperfective	-né
Perfective	-neʼ
Progressive/Future	-neeł
Usitative/Iterative	-neeh
Optative	-neʼ

==== Imperfective ====
The imperfective indicates an event/action that has begun but remains incomplete. Although this mode does not refer to tense, it can usually be translated into English as a present tense form: yishááh "I'm (in the act of) going/coming", yishą́ "I'm (in the act of) eating (something)". With the addition of adverbials, the imperfective can be used for events/actions in the past, present, or future. The mode is used in the second person for immediate imperatives. The imperfective mode has a distinct imperfective stem form and four different mode-aspect prefix paradigms:

1. with a ni- terminative prefix in position 7 as in nishááh "I'm in the act of arriving."
2. with a si- stative prefix in position 7 as in shishʼaah "I'm in the act of placing a SRO (solid roundish object)" in dah shishʼaah "I'm in the act of placing a SRO (solid roundish object) up" (dah "up").
3. with no prefix in position 7, usually identified as a ∅- prefix, as in yishcha "I'm crying."
4. with either a yi- transitional or yi- semelfactive prefix in position 6 (and no prefix in position 7).

==== Perfective ====
The perfective indicates an event/action that has been completed. When referring to past situations, it usually corresponds to English simple past: yíyáʼ "I went/came/arrived", yíyą́ą́ʼ "I ate (something)". However, since the perfective mode is not a tense, it can be used to refer non-past actions, such as the future (where it may be translated as English "will have" + VERB). The perfective mode has a distinct perfective stem form and four different prefix paradigms:

1. with a yí- perfective prefix with a high tone in position 7 as in yíchʼid "I scratched it."
2. with a ní- terminative prefix with a high tone in position 7 as in níyá "I arrived."
3. with a sí- stative prefix with high tone in position 7 as in sélį́į́ʼ "I roasted it."
4. with a yi- transitional prefix in position 6 (and ∅- in position 7) as in yiizįʼ "I stood up."

==== Progressive and future ====
The progressive indicates an incomplete event/action that is ongoing without reference to the beginning or end of the event/action. This mode may be translated into English as BE + VERB-ing + "along": yishááł "I'm going/walking along", yishtééł "I'm carrying it along".

The future mode is primarily a future tense – indicating a prospective event/action: deeshááł "I'll go/come", deeshį́į́ł "I'll eat (something)". The progressive mode has a yi- progressive prefix (in position 7), the future has a di- inceptive prefix (in position 6) and the yi- progressive prefix.

==== Usitative ====
The usitative indicates a repetitive event/action that takes place customarily: yishááh "I usually go", yishdlį́į́h "I always drink (something)". The iterative is a frequentative indicating a recurrent event/action that takes place repeatedly and customarily:

ahbínígo tłʼóóʼgóó chʼínáshdááh
{in the morning} outdoors {repeatedly go out}
"I always (repeatedly) go outdoors in the morning"

nínádiishʼnahgo gohwééh náshdlį́į́h
{when I get up} coffee {drink (something) repeatedly}
"I drink coffee when I get up"

The iterative is distinguished from the usitative by a ná- repetitive prefix (in position 2) and also sometimes by a -d- or -ł- classifier prefix (in position 9).

==== Optative ====
The optative indicates a positive or negative desire or wish. The mode is used with the addition of adverbial particles that follow the verb, such as laanaa and lágo: nahółtą́ą́ʼ laanaa "I wish it would rain", nahółtą́ą́ʼ lágo "I hope it doesn't rain". With punctual verbs, the optative mode can be used to form a negative imperative: shinóółʼį́į́ʼ (lágo) "don't look at me!". In certain adverbial frames, the optative indicates positive or negative potential.

=== Aspects and subaspects ===
The primary aspects:

1. Momentaneous – an action that takes place at a specific point in time
2. Continuative – an action that covers an indefinite timeframe, without a specific beginning, goal, or even temporal direction
3. Durative – similar to the continuative, but not covering locomotion verbs
4. Conclusive – similar to the durative, but emphasizing the completed nature of the action when in the perfective mode
5. Repetitive – an action that is repeated in some way, dependent on the sub-aspect and sub-sub-aspect type used
6. Semelfactive – an action that is distinguished from a connected group or series of actions
7. Distributive – an action that occurs among a group of targets or locations
8. Diversative – an action that occurs "here and there", among an unspecified group of targets or locations
9. Reversative – an action involving change in physical or metaphorical direction
10. Conative – an action the subject attempts to perform
11. Transitional – an action involving transition from one status or form to another
12. Cursive – an action of moving in a straight line in space or time

The subaspects:

- Completive – event/action simply takes place
- Terminative – stopping of action
- Stative – sequentially durative and static
- Inceptive – beginning of action
- Terminal – inherently terminal action
- Prolongative – arrested beginning or ending of action
- Seriative – interconnected series of successive separate & distinct acts
- Inchoative – focus on beginning of non-locomotion action
- Reversionary – return to previous state/location
- Semeliterative – single repetition of event/action

Navajo modes co-occur with various aspects. For example, the verb "rain falls" can occur in the perfective mode with the momentaneous and distributive aspects: -tsąąʼ (perfective momentaneous), -tsįʼ (perfective distributive). As with the modes, different aspects have different stem forms even when in the same mode, as seen with the previous "rain falls" perfective stems. Thus, a given verb has a set of stem forms that can be classified into both a mode and an aspect category. Verb stem paradigms of mode and aspect are given below for two different verbs:

"to curl, shrivel, contract into distorted shape"
	Imperfective	Perfective	Progressive- future	Usitative- iterative	Optative
Momentaneous	-chʼííł	-chʼil	-chʼił	-chʼił	-chʼííł
Transitional	-chʼííł	-chʼiil	-chʼił	-chʼił	-chʼííł
Continuative, conclusive	-chʼil	-chʼil	-chʼił	-chʼił	-chʼil
Semelfactive	-chʼił	-chʼił	-chʼił	-chʼił	-chʼił
Repetitive	-chʼił	–	–	–	–
Conative	-chʼiił	-chʼil	-chʼił	-chʼił	-chʼiił

"to smell, have an odor, stink"
	Imperfective	Perfective	Progressive- future	Usitative- iterative	Optative
Momentaneous, diversative, distributive	-chįįh	-chą́ą́ʼ	-chįįł	-chįįh	-chą́ą́ʼ
Continuative	-chą́ą́ʼ	-chą́ą́ʼ	-chį́į́ł	-chį́į́h	-chą́ą́ʼ
Conclusive	-chin	-chą́ą́ʼ	-chį́į́ł	-chįįh	-chą́ą́ʼ
Semelfactive	-chįh	-chįh	-chįh	-chįh	-chįh
Repetitive	-chą́ą́ʼ	–	–	–	–
Conative	-chį́į́h	–	–	–	–
Cursive	–	–	-chį́į́ł/-chį́į́h	–	–

As can be seen above, some aspect and mode combinations do not occur depending mostly upon the semantics of the particular verb. Additionally, some aspects do not occur at all with a particular verb. The patterns of verb stem alternations are very complex although there is a significant amount of homophony. A particularly important investigation into this area of the Navajo verb is Hardy (1979).

=== Classificatory verbs ===
Navajo has verb stems that classify a particular object by its shape or other physical characteristics in addition to describing the movement or state of the object. Athabaskan linguistics identifies these as classificatory verb stems and usually identifies them with an acronym label. The eleven primary classificatory "handling" verb stems appear listed below (in the perfective mode):

Classifier + stem	Standard name	Acronym	Contexts of use
-ʼą́	Solid Roundish Object	SRO	bottle, ball, boot, box, etc.
-yį́	Load, Pack, Burden	LPB	backpack, bundle, sack, saddle, etc.
-ł-jool	Non-Compact Matter	NCM	bunch of hair or grass, cloud, fog, etc.
-lá	Slender Flexible Object	SFO	rope, mittens, socks, pile of fried onions, etc.
-tįʼ	Slender Stiff Object	SSO	arrow, bracelet, skillet, saw, etc.
-ł-tsooz	Flat Flexible Object	FFO	blanket, coat, sack of groceries, etc.
-tłééʼ	Mushy Matter	MM	ice cream, mud, slumped-over drunken person, etc.
-nil	Plural Objects 1	PLO1	eggs, balls, animals, coins, etc.
-jaaʼ	Plural Objects 2	PLO2	marbles, seeds, sugar, bugs, etc.
-ką́	Open Container	OC	glass of milk, spoonful of food, handful of flour, etc.
-ł-tį́	Animate Object	ANO	microbe, person, corpse, doll, etc.

To compare with English, Navajo has no single verb that corresponds to the English word to give. To say the equivalent of Give me some hay!, the Navajo verb níłjool (non-compact matter (NCM)) must be used, while for Give me a cigarette! the verb nítįįh (slender stiff object (SSO)) must be used. The English verb to give is expressed by eleven different verbs in Navajo, depending on the characteristics of the given object.

In addition to defining the physical properties of the object, primary classificatory verb stems also can distinguish between the manner of movement of the object. The stems may then be grouped into three different categories:

1. handling – movement of an object by continuing physical contact throughout the movement (take, bring, carry, lower, attach, etc.)
2. propelling – movement of an object by propulsion (throw, toss, drop, etc.)
3. free flight – movement of a subject of its own without causative agent (fly, fall, etc.)

Using an example for the solid roundish object (SRO) category, Navajo has:

1. -ʼą́ "to handle (a round object)"
2. -neʼ "to throw (a round object)"
3. -l-tsʼid "to move independently (intransitive; of a round object)"

=== yi-/bi- alternation (animacy) ===
Like most Athabaskan languages, Navajo shows various levels of animacy in its grammar, with certain nouns taking specific verb forms according to their rank in this hierarchy. For instance, nouns can be ranked by animacy on a continuum from most animate (a human or lightning) to least animate (an abstraction) (Young & Morgan 1987: 65–66):

humans/lightning → infants/big animals → midsize animals → small animals → insects → natural forces → inanimate objects/plants → abstractions

Generally, the most animate noun in a sentence must occur first while the noun with lesser animacy occurs second. If both nouns are equal in animacy, then either noun can occur in the first position. So, both example sentences (1) and (2) are correct. The yi- prefix on the verb indicates that the 1st noun is the subject and bi- indicates that the 2nd noun is the subject.

Ashkii atʼééd yiníłʼį́.
boy girl yi-look.at
'The boy is looking at the girl.'

Atʼééd ashkii biníłʼį́.
girl boy bi-look.at
'The girl is being looked at by the boy.'

But example sentence (3) sounds wrong to most Navajo speakers because the less animate noun occurs before the more animate noun:

* Tsídii atʼééd yishtąsh.
{} bird girl yi-pecked
'The bird pecked the girl.'

To express this idea requires that the more animate noun occur first, as in sentence (4):

Atʼééd tsídii bishtąsh.
girl bird bi-pecked
'The girl was pecked by the bird.'

Note that although sentence (2) and (4) are translated into English with a passive verb, in Navajo it is not passive. Passive verbs are formed by certain classifier prefixes (i.e., transitivity prefixes) that occur directly before the verb stem in position 9. The yi-/bi- prefixes do not mark sentences as active or passive, but as direct or inverse.

== Nouns ==
Many concepts expressed using nouns in other languages appear as verbs in Navajo. The majority of true nouns are not inflected for number, and there is no case marking. Noun phrases are often not needed to form grammatical sentences due to the informational content of the verb.

There are two main types of nouns in Navajo:

1. simple nouns and
2. nouns derived from verbs (called deverbal nouns)

The simple nouns can be distinguished by their ability to be inflected with a possessive prefix, as in

Noun stem	Gloss	Inflected
béésh	"knife"	bi- béézh 3.POSS knife "her knife"
hééł	"pack"	shi- yéél 1SG.POSS pack "my pack"

=== Deverbal nouns ===
Deverbal nouns are verbs (or verb phrases) that have been nominalized with a nominalizing enclitic or converted into a noun through zero derivation (that is, verbs that are used syntactically as nouns without an added nominalizer).

náʼoolkił =í
{it.is.moved.slowly.in.a.circle} NMZ
"clock"

hataał =ii
{he.sings} NMZ
"singer"

Converted deverbal nouns include chʼéʼétiin "exit, doorway" and Hoozdo "Phoenix, Arizona". When used as verbs, chʼéʼétiin may be translated into English as "something has a path horizontally out" and hoozdo as "place/space is hot".

Deverbal nouns can potentially be long and complex, such as:

{chidí naaʼnaʼí} beeʼeldǫǫhtsoh bikááʼ {dah naaznil} =ígíí
tractor cannon {on.it} {they.sit up} NMZ
"army tank"

=== Number ===
Most nouns are not inflected for number. Plurality is usually encoded directly in the verb through the use of various prefixes or aspects, though this is by no means mandatory. In the following example, (2) is used with the plural prefix da- and switches to the distributive aspect.

Kin áshłééh.
kin á-Ø-sh-łééh
house make-3.OBJ-1.SUBJ-make.MOM.IMPF
'I build a house.'

Kin ádaashleʼ.
kin á-da-Ø-sh-łeʼ
house make-PL-3.OBJ-1.SUBJ-make.DIST.IMPF
'I build houses.'

=== Possession ===
Possession in Navajo is expressed with personal pronoun prefixes:

	Singular	Dual	Plural
First	shi-	nihi-	danihi-
Second	ni-	nihi-	danihi-
Third	bi-		
Fourth (3o)	yi-		
Fourth (3a)	ha-, hw-		
Indefinite (3i)	a-		

Most of the time, these prefixes take a low tone, but in some nouns and postpositions, the final syllable of the prefix takes a high tone, such as shílaʼ "my hand," nihílaʼ "our/your hand."

The prefixes are also used when the possessor in a possessive phrase is a noun, as in:

Jáan bimá
John his-mother
"John's mother"

Navajo marks inalienable possession for certain nouns – relatives, body parts, homes and dens. These nouns can only appear with a possessive prefix, as in shimá "my mother." If one wishes to speak of mothers in general, the 3rd person indefinite prefix ʼa- "someone's" is used, amá.

== Postpositions ==
Navajo uses a number of postpositions where European languages tend to favor prepositions; thus, all spatial and most other relations such as under, on, or above are expressed by using the possessive prefix in combination with a postposition. All postpositions are inalienable, meaning that a prefix or fusion with a true noun is mandatory.

Examples include:

- biyaa (under it)
- bikááʼ (on it)
- bitah (among it)

These can be combined with all prefixes to construct forms such as shiyaa (under me). Occasionally, postpositions are fused with true nouns to form a single word, such as Dinétah.

== Numerals ==
Navajo numbers 1 to 10

Navajo uses a decimal (base-10) numeral system. There are unique words for the cardinal numbers 1–10. The numerals 11–19 are formed by adding an additive "plus 10" suffix -tsʼáadah to the base numerals 1–9. The numerals 20–100 are formed by adding a multiplicative "times 10" suffix -diin to the base numerals 2–10.

	Base numeral	+10 (-tsʼáadah)		× 10 (-diin)	
1	tʼááłáʼí	łaʼtsʼáadah	(11)	–	
2	naaki	naakitsʼáadah	(12)	naadiin	(20)
3	tááʼ	tááʼtsʼáadah	(13)	tádiin	(30)
4	dį́į́ʼ	dį́į́ʼtsʼáadah	(14)	dízdiin	(40)
5	ashdlaʼ	ashdlaʼáadah	(15)	ashdladiin	(50)
6	hastą́ą́	hastą́ʼáadah	(16)	hastą́diin	(60)
7	tsostsʼid	tsostsʼidtsʼáadah	(17)	tsostsʼidiin	(70)
8	tseebíí	tseebíítsʼáadah	(18)	tseebídiin	(80)
9	náhástʼéí	náhástʼéítsʼáadah	(19)	náhástʼédiin	(90)
10	neeznáá	–		neeznádiin	(100)

In the compound numerals, the combining forms of the base numerals have irregular vowel and consonants changes. The numeral "1" has three forms:

- łáaʼii (used in counting "one", "two", "three", etc.)
- -łaʼ- (a shortened combining form)
- tʼááłáʼí (used in larger numbers and with a distributive plural prefix)

The combining form łaʼ- is used in the compound łaʼ-tsʼáadah "11". The numeral tááʼ loses the final ʼ consonant while the final vowel in hastą́ą́ is shortened when the -tsʼáadah "+10" suffix is added. The suffix loses its initial tsʼ becoming -áadah when added to ashdlaʼ "5". Several changes occur when the -diin suffix is added involving a loss of the final consonant or a reduction in vowel length:

- naaki → naa-
- tááʼ → tá-
- dį́į́ʼ → díz-
- ashdlaʼ → ashdla-
- hastą́ą́ → hastą́-
- tsostsʼid → tsostsʼi-
- tseebíí → tseebí-
- náhástʼéí → náhástʼé-
- neeznáá → neezná-

For the cardinal numerals higher than 20 between the multiples of 10 (i.e., 21–29, 31–39, 41–49, etc.), there are two types of formations. The numerals 21–29 and 41–49 are formed by suffixing the ones digit to the tens digit, as in:

naadįįnaaki ← naadiin {} naaki
22 = 20 + 2

dízdįįłaʼ ← dízdiin {} -łaʼ
41 = 40 + 1

Here the -diin suffix appears in the combining form -dįį-. The combining form -łá "1" is used as well:

20		40	
naadiin	(20)	dízdiin	(40)
21–29		41–49	
naadįįłaʼ	(21)	dízdįįłaʼ	(41)
naadįįnaaki	(22)	dízdįįnaaki	(42)
naadįįtááʼ	(23)	dízdįįtááʼ	(43)
naadįįdį́į́ʼ	(24)	dízdįįdį́į́ʼ	(44)
naadįįʼashdlaʼ	(25)	dízdįįʼashdlaʼ	(45)
naadįįhastą́ą́	(26)	dízdįįhastą́ą́	(46)
naadįįtsostsʼid	(27)	dízdįįtsostsʼid	(47)
naadįįtseebíí	(28)	dízdįįtseebíí	(48)
naadįįnáhástʼéí	(29)	dízdįįnáhástʼéí	(49)

The other numerals are formed by placing dóó baʼąą "and in addition to it" between the tens digit and the ones digit, as in:

tádiin {dóó baʼąą} tʼááłáʼí {} {}
30 + 1 = 31

ashdladiin {dóó baʼąą} tʼááʼ {} {}
50 + 3 = 53

The numerals 41–49 may also be formed in this manner:

dízdiin {dóó baʼąą} naaki {} {}
40 + 2 = 42

or

dízdiin {} naaki → dízdįįnaaki
40 + 2 = 42

The cardinal numerals 100–900 are formed by adding the multiplicative enclitic =di to the base numerals 1–9 and adding the word for "hundred" neeznádiin, as in:

	Base numeral	× 100 (=di + neeznádiin)
1	tʼááłáʼí	tʼááłáhádí neeznádiin (100)
2	naaki	naakidi neeznádiin (200)
3	tááʼ	táadi neeznádiin (300)
4	dį́į́ʼ	dį́įʼdi neeznádiin (400)
5	ashdlaʼ	ashdladi neeznádiin (500)
6	hastą́ą́h	hastą́ądi neeznádiin (600)
7	tsostsʼid	tsostsʼidi neeznádiin (700)
8	tseebíí	tseebíidi neeznádiin (800)
9	náhástʼéí	náhástʼéidi neeznádiin (900)

The base numerals with a high tone in the last syllable change to a falling tone before =di.

For the thousands, the word mííl (from Spanish mil) is used in conjunction with =di:

- tʼááłáhádí mííl "one thousand"
- naakidi mííl "two thousand"

The word for "million" is formed by adding the stem -tsoh "big" to mííl: mííltsoh "million" as in:

- tʼááłáhádí mííltsoh "one million"
- naakidi mííltsoh "two million"
