= Grammatical aspect =

Grammatical category expressing how a verb extends over time

In linguistics, aspect is a grammatical category that expresses how a verbal action, event, or state, extends over time. For instance, perfective aspect is used in referring to an event conceived as bounded and only once occurring, without reference to any flow of time during the event ("I helped him"). Imperfective aspect is used for situations conceived as existing continuously or habitually as time flows ("I was helping him"; "I used to help people").

Further distinctions can be made, for example, to distinguish states and ongoing actions (continuous and progressive aspects) from repetitive actions (habitual aspect).

Certain aspectual distinctions express a relation between the time of the event and the time of reference. This is the case with the perfect aspect, which indicates that an event occurred prior to but has continuing relevance at the time of reference: "I have eaten"; "I had eaten"; "I will have eaten".

Different languages make different grammatical aspectual distinctions; some (such as Standard German; see below) do not make any. The marking of aspect is often conflated with the marking of tense and mood (see tense–aspect–mood). Aspectual distinctions may be restricted to certain tenses: in Latin and the Romance languages, for example, the perfective–imperfective distinction is marked in the past tense, by the division between preterites and imperfects. Explicit consideration of aspect as a category first arose out of study of the Slavic languages; here verbs often occur in pairs, with two related verbs being used respectively for imperfective and perfective meanings.

The concept of grammatical aspect (or verbal aspect) should not be confused with perfect and imperfect verb forms; the meanings of the latter terms are somewhat different, and in some languages, the common names used for verb forms may not follow the actual aspects precisely. For example, English and German have perfect tenses that are wholly parallel in form but do not always have equivalent meaning because the aspect is not always identical.

== Basic concept ==
=== History ===
The Indian linguist Yaska (circa 7th century BCE) dealt with grammatical aspect, distinguishing actions that are processes (bhāva), from those where the action is considered as a completed whole (mūrta). This is the key distinction between the imperfective and perfective. Yaska also applied this distinction to a verb versus an action nominal.

Grammarians of the Greek and Latin languages also showed an interest in aspect, but the idea did not enter into the modern Western grammatical tradition until the 19th century via the study of the grammar of the Slavic languages. The earliest use of the term recorded in the Oxford English Dictionary dates from 1853.

=== Modern usage ===
Aspect is often confused with the closely related concept of tense, because they both convey information about time. While tense relates the time of referent to some other time, commonly the speech event, aspect conveys other temporal information, such as duration, completion, or frequency, as it relates to the time of action. Thus tense refers to temporally when while aspect refers to temporally how. Aspect can be said to describe the texture of the time in which a situation occurs, such as a single point of time, a continuous range of time, a sequence of discrete points in time, etc., whereas tense indicates its location in time.

For example, consider the following sentences: "I eat", "I am eating", "I have eaten", and "I have been eating". All are in the present tense, indicated by the present-tense verb of each sentence (eat, am, and have). Yet since they differ in aspect, each conveys different information or points of view as to how the action pertains to the present.

Grammatical aspect is a formal property of a language, distinguished through overt inflection, derivational affixes, or independent words that serve as grammatically required markers of those aspects. For example, the Kʼicheʼ language spoken in Guatemala has the inflectional prefixes k- and x- to mark incompletive and completive aspect; Mandarin Chinese has the aspect markers -le 了, -zhe 着, zài- 在, and -guò 过 to mark the perfective, durative stative, durative progressive, and experiential aspects, and also marks aspect with adverbs; and English marks the continuous aspect with the verb to be coupled with present participle and the perfect with the verb to have coupled with past participle. Even languages that do not mark aspect morphologically or through auxiliary verbs, however, can convey such distinctions by the use of adverbs or other syntactic constructions.

Grammatical aspect is distinguished from lexical aspect or Aktionsart, which is an inherent feature of verbs or verb phrases and is determined by the nature of the situation that the verb describes.

== Common aspectual distinctions ==
The most fundamental aspectual distinction, represented in many languages, is between perfective aspect and imperfective aspect. This is the basic aspectual distinction in most Slavic and Romance languages.

It semantically corresponds to the distinction between the morphological forms known respectively as the aorist and imperfect in Greek, the preterite and imperfect in Spanish, the simple past (passé simple) and imperfect in French, and the perfect and imperfect in Latin (from the Latin perfectus, meaning "completed").

Language	Perfective Aspect	Imperfective Aspect
Latin	Perfect	Imperfect
Spanish	Pretérito	Imperfect
French	Passé simple	Imperfect
Greek	Aorist	Imperfect
Portuguese	Pretérito perfeito	Imperfect

Essentially, the perfective aspect looks at an event as a complete action, while the imperfective aspect views an event as the process of unfolding or a repeated or habitual event (thus corresponding to the progressive/continuous aspect for events of short-term duration and to habitual aspect for longer terms).

For events of short durations in the past, the distinction often coincides with the distinction in the English language between the simple past "X-ed," as compared to the progressive "was X-ing". Compare "I wrote the letters this morning" (i.e. finished writing the letters: an action completed) and "I was writing the letters this morning" (the letters may still be unfinished).

In describing longer time periods, English needs context to maintain the distinction between the habitual ("I called him often in the past" – a habit that has no point of completion) and perfective ("I called him once" – an action completed), although the construct "used to" marks both habitual aspect and past tense and can be used if the aspectual distinction otherwise is not clear.

Sometimes, English has a lexical distinction where other languages may use the distinction in grammatical aspect. For example, the English verbs "to know" (the state of knowing) and "to find out" (knowing viewed as a "completed action") correspond to the imperfect and perfect forms of the equivalent verbs in French and Spanish, savoir and saber. This is also true when the sense of verb "to know" is "to know somebody", in this case opposed in aspect to the verb "to meet" (or even to the construction "to get to know"). These correspond to imperfect and perfect forms of conocer in Spanish, and connaître in French. In German, on the other hand, the distinction is also lexical (as in English) through verbs kennen and kennenlernen, although the semantic relation between both forms is much more straightforward since kennen means "to know" and lernen means "to learn".

== Aspect vis-à-vis tense ==
The Germanic languages combine the concept of aspect with the concept of tense. Although English largely separates tense and aspect formally, its aspects (neutral, progressive, perfect, progressive perfect, and [in the past tense] habitual) do not correspond very closely to the distinction of perfective vs. imperfective that is found in most languages with aspect. Furthermore, the separation of tense and aspect in English is not maintained rigidly. One instance of this is the alternation, in some forms of English, between sentences such as "Have you eaten?" and "Did you eat?".

In European languages, rather than locating an event time, the way tense does, aspect describes "the internal temporal constituency of a situation", or in other words, aspect is a way "of conceiving the flow of the process itself". English aspectual distinctions in the past tense include "I went, I used to go, I was going, I had gone"; in the present tense "I lose, I am losing, I have lost, I have been losing, I am going to lose"; and with the future modal "I will see, I will be seeing, I will have seen, I am going to see". What distinguishes these aspects within each tense is not (necessarily) when the event occurs, but how the time in which it occurs is viewed: as complete, ongoing, consequential, planned, etc.

In most dialects of Ancient Greek, aspect is indicated uniquely by verbal morphology. For example, the very frequently used aorist, though a functional preterite in the indicative mood, conveys historic or 'immediate' aspect in the subjunctive and optative. The perfect in all moods is used as an aspectual marker, conveying the sense of a resultant state. E.g. ὁράω – I see (present); εἶδον – I saw (aorist); οἶδα – I am in a state of having seen = I know (perfect). Turkish has a same/similar aspect, such as in Görmüş bulunuyorum/durumdayım, where görmüş means "having seen" and bulunuyorum/durumdayım means "I am in the state".

In many Sino-Tibetan languages, such as Mandarin, verbs lack grammatical markers of tense, but are rich in aspect (Heine, Kuteva 2010, p. 10). Markers of aspect are attached to verbs to indicate aspect. Event time is inferred through use of these aspectual markers, along with optional inclusion of adverbs.

== Lexical vis-à-vis grammatical aspect ==
There is a distinction between grammatical aspect, as described here, and lexical aspect. Other terms for the contrast lexical vs. grammatical include: situation vs. viewpoint and inner vs. outer. Lexical aspect, also known as Aktionsart, is an inherent property of a verb or verb-complement phrase, and is not marked formally. The distinctions made as part of lexical aspect are different from those of grammatical aspect. Typical distinctions are between states ("I owned"), activities ("I shopped"), accomplishments ("I painted a picture"), achievements ("I bought"), and punctual, or semelfactive, events ("I sneezed"). These distinctions are often relevant syntactically. For example, states and activities, but not usually achievements, can be used in English with a prepositional for-phrase describing a time duration: "I had a car for five hours", "I shopped for five hours", but not "*I bought a car for five hours". Lexical aspect is sometimes called Aktionsart, especially by German and Slavic linguists. Lexical or situation aspect is marked in Athabaskan languages.

One of the factors in situation aspect is telicity. Telicity might be considered a kind of lexical aspect, except that it is typically not a property of a verb in isolation, but rather a property of an entire verb phrase. Achievements, accomplishments and semelfactives have telic situation aspect, while states and activities have atelic situation aspect.

The other factor in situation aspect is duration, which is also a property of a verb phrase. Accomplishments, states, and activities have duration, while achievements and semelfactives do not.

== Indicating aspect ==
In some languages, aspect and time are very clearly separated, making them much more distinct to their speakers. There are a number of languages that mark aspect much more saliently than time. Prominent in this category are Chinese and American Sign Language, which both differentiate many aspects but rely exclusively on optional time-indicating terms to pinpoint an action with respect to time. In other language groups, for example in most modern Indo-European languages (except Slavic languages and some Indo-Aryan languages like Hindi), aspect has become almost entirely conflated, in the verbal morphological system, with time.

In Russian, aspect is more salient than tense in narrative. Russian, like other Slavic languages, uses different lexical entries for the different aspects, whereas other languages mark them morphologically, and still others with auxiliaries (e.g., English).

In Hindi, the aspect marker is overtly separated from the tense/mood marker. Periphrastic Hindi verb forms consist of two elements. The first of these two elements is the aspect marker and the second element (the copula) is the common tense/mood marker.

In literary Arabic (الْفُصْحَى al-fuṣḥā) the verb has two aspect-tenses: perfective (past), and imperfective (non-past). There is some disagreement among grammarians whether to view the distinction as a distinction in aspect, or tense, or both. The past verb (الْفِعْل الْمَاضِي al-fiʿl al-māḍī) denotes an event (حَدَث ḥadaṯ) completed in the past, but it says nothing about the relation of this past event to present status. For example, وَصَلَ waṣala, "arrived", indicates that arrival occurred in the past without saying anything about the present status of the arriver – maybe they stuck around, maybe they turned around and left, etc. – nor about the aspect of the past event except insofar as completeness can be considered aspectual. This past verb is clearly similar if not identical to the Greek aorist, which is considered a tense but is more of an aspect marker. In Arabic, aorist aspect is the logical consequence of past tense. By contrast, the "Verb of Similarity" (الْفِعْل الْمُضَارِع al-fiʿl al-muḍāriʿ), so called because of its resemblance to the active participial noun, is considered to denote an event in the present or future without committing to a specific aspectual sense beyond the incompleteness implied by the tense: يَضْرِبُ (yaḍribu, he strikes/is striking/will strike/etc.). Those are the only two "tenses" in Arabic (not counting أَمْر amr, command or imperative, which is traditionally considered as denoting future events.) To explicitly mark aspect, Arabic uses a variety of lexical and syntactic devices.

Contemporary Arabic dialects are another matter. One major change from al-fuṣḥā is the use of a prefix particle (بِ bi in Egyptian and Levantine dialects—though it may have a slightly different range of functions in each dialect) to explicitly mark progressive, continuous, or habitual aspect: بيكتب, bi-yiktib, he is now writing, writes all the time, etc.

Aspect can mark the stage of an action. The prospective aspect is a combination of tense and aspect that indicates the action is in preparation to take place. The inceptive aspect identifies the beginning stage of an action (e.g. Esperanto uses ek-, e.g. Mi ekmanĝas, "I am beginning to eat".) and inchoative and ingressive aspects identify a change of state (The flowers started blooming) or the start of an action (He started running). Aspects of stage continue through progressive, pausative, resumptive, cessive, and terminative.

Important qualifications:

- Although the perfective is often thought of as representing a "momentary action", this is not strictly correct. It can equally well be used for an action that took time, as long as it is conceived of as a unit, with a clearly defined start and end, such as "Last summer I visited France".
- Grammatical aspect represents a formal distinction encoded in the grammar of a language. Although languages that are described as having imperfective and perfective aspects agree in most cases in their use of these aspects, they may not agree in every situation. For example:
  - Some languages have additional grammatical aspects. Spanish and Ancient Greek, for example, have a perfect (not the same as the perfective), which refers to a state resulting from a previous action (also described as a previous action with relevance to a particular time, or a previous action viewed from the perspective of a later time). This corresponds (roughly) to the "have X-ed" construction in English, as in "I have recently eaten". Languages that lack this aspect (such as Portuguese, which is closely related to Spanish) often use the past perfective to render the present perfect (compare the roughly synonymous English sentences "Have you eaten yet?" and "Did you eat yet?").
  - In some languages, the formal representation of aspect is optional, and can be omitted when the aspect is clear from context or does not need to be emphasized. This is the case, for example, in Mandarin Chinese, with the perfective suffix le and (especially) the imperfective zhe.
  - For some verbs in some languages, the difference between perfective and imperfective conveys an additional meaning difference; in such cases, the two aspects are typically translated using separate verbs in English. In Greek, for example, the imperfective sometimes adds the notion of "try to do something" (the so-called conative imperfect); hence, the same verb, in the imperfective (present or imperfect) and aorist, respectively, is used to convey look and see, search and find, listen and hear. (For example, ἠκούομεν (ēkouomen, "we listened") vs. ἠκούσαμεν (ēkousamen, "we heard").) Spanish has similar pairs for certain verbs, such as (imperfect and preterite, respectively) sabía ("I knew") vs. supe ("I found out"), podía ("I was able to") vs. pude ("I succeeded (in doing something)"), quería ("I wanted to") vs. quise ("I tried to"), and no quería ("I did not want to") vs. no quise ("I refused (to do something)"). Such differences are often highly language-specific.

== By language ==
=== Germanic languages ===
==== English ====
The English tense–aspect system has two morphologically distinct tenses, past and non-past, the latter of which is also known as the present-future or, more commonly and less formally, simply the present. No marker of a distinct future tense exists on the verb itself in English; the futurity of an event may be expressed through the use of the auxiliary verbs "will" and "shall", by a non-past form plus an adverb, as in "tomorrow we go to New York City", or by some other means. Past is distinguished from non-past, in contrast, with internal modifications of the verb. These two tenses may be modified further for progressive aspect (also called continuous aspect), for the perfect, or for both. These two aspectual forms are also referred to as BE +ING and HAVE +EN, respectively, which avoids what may be unfamiliar terminology.

Aspects of the present tense:

- Present simple (not progressive, not perfect): "I eat"
- Present progressive (progressive, not perfect): "I am eating"
- Present perfect (not progressive, perfect): "I have eaten"
- Present perfect progressive (progressive, perfect): "I have been eating"

(While many elementary discussions of English grammar classify the present perfect as a past tense, it relates the action to the present time. One cannot say of someone now deceased that they "have eaten" or "have been eating". The present auxiliary implies that they are in some way present (alive), even when the action denoted is completed (perfect) or partially completed (progressive perfect).)

Aspects of the past tense:

- Past simple (not progressive, not perfect): "I ate"
- Past progressive (progressive, not perfect): "I was eating"
- Past perfect (not progressive, perfect): "I had eaten"
- Past perfect progressive (progressive, perfect): "I had been eating"

Aspects can also be marked on non-finite forms of the verb: "(to) be eating" (infinitive with progressive aspect), "(to) have eaten" (infinitive with perfect aspect), "having eaten" (present participle or gerund with perfect aspect), etc. The perfect infinitive can further be governed by modal verbs to express various meanings, mostly combining modality with past reference: "I should have eaten" etc. In particular, the modals will and shall and their subjunctive forms would and should are used to combine future or hypothetical reference with aspectual meaning:

- Simple future, simple conditional: "I will eat", "I would eat"
- Future progressive, conditional progressive: "I will be eating", "I would be eating"
- Future perfect, conditional perfect: "I will have eaten", "I would have eaten"
- Future perfect progressive, conditional perfect progressive: "I will have been eating", "I would have been eating"

The uses of the progressive and perfect aspects are quite complex. They may refer to the viewpoint of the speaker:

I was walking down the road when I met Michael Jackson's lawyer. (Speaker viewpoint in middle of action)
I have traveled widely, but I have never been to Moscow. (Speaker viewpoint at end of action)

But they can have other illocutionary forces or additional modal components:

You are being stupid now. (You are doing it deliberately)
You are not having chocolate with your sausages! (I forbid it)
I am having lunch with Mike tomorrow. (It is decided)

English expresses some other aspectual distinctions with other constructions. Used to + VERB is a past habitual, as in "I used to go to school," and going to / gonna + VERB is a prospective, a future situation highlighting current intention or expectation, as in "I'm going to go to school next year."

==== African American Vernacular English ====
The aspectual systems of certain dialects of English, such as African-American Vernacular English (see for example habitual be), and of creoles based on English vocabulary, such as Hawaiian Creole English, are quite different from those of standard English, and often reflect a more elaborate paradigm of aspectual distinctions (often at the expense of tense). The following table, appearing originally in Green (2002) shows the possible aspectual distinctions in AAVE in their prototypical, negative and stressed/emphatic affirmative forms:

Aspectual Marking in AAVE
Aspect/Tense	Prototypical	Stressed / Emphatic Affirmative	Negative
Habitual	'be eating' (see Habitual be)	'DO be eating'	'don('t) be eating'
Remote Past	'BEEN eating' (see)	'HAVE BEEN eating'	'ain('t)/haven't BEEN eating'
Remote Past Completive	'BEEN ate'	'HAD BEEN ate'	'ain('t)/haven't BEEN ate'
Remote Past Perfect	'had BEEN ate'	'HAD BEEN ate'	'hadn't BEEN ate'
Resultant State	'done ate'	'HAVE done ate'	'ain('t) done ate'
Past Perfect Resultant State	'had done ate'	'HAD done ate'	'hadn't done ate'
Modal Resultant State	'should'a done ate'	--	--
Remote Past Resultant State	'BEEN done ate'	'HAVE BEEN done ate'	'ain('t)/haven't BEEN done ate'
Remote Past Perfect Resultant State	'had BEEN done ate'	--	--
Future Resultant State/Conditional	' 'a be done ate'	'WILL be done ate'	'won't be done ate'
Modal Resultant State	'might/may be done ate'	'MIGHT/MAY be done ate'	'might/may not be done ate'

==== German vernacular and colloquial ====
Although Standard German does not have aspects, many Upper German and all West Central German dialects, and some more vernacular forms of German do make an aspectual distinction which partly corresponds with the English continuous form: alongside the standard present tense Ich esse ('I eat') and past Ich aß ('I ate') there is the form Ich bin/war am essen/Essen ('I am/was at the eating'; capitalization varies). This is formed by the conjugated auxiliary verb sein ("to be") followed by the preposition and article am (=an dem) and the infinitive, which German uses in many constructions as a verbal noun.

In the Tyrolean and other Bavarian regiolect the prefix *da can be found, which form perfective aspects. "I hu's gleant" (Ich habe es gelernt = I learnt it) vs. "I hu's daleant" (*Ich habe es DAlernt = I succeeded in learning).

==== Dutch ====
In Dutch (a West Germanic language), two types of continuous form are used. Both types are considered Standard Dutch.

The first type is very similar to the non-standard German type. It is formed by the conjugated auxiliary verb zijn ("to be"), followed by aan het and the gerund (which in Dutch matches the infinitive). For example:

- Present progressive: Ik ben aan het werken ("I am working")
- Past progressive: Ik was aan het werken ("I was working")
- Future progressive: Ik zal aan het werken zijn ("I will be working")

The second type is formed by one of the conjugated auxiliary verbs liggen ("to lie"), zitten ("to sit"), hangen ("to hang"), staan ("to stand") or lopen ("to walk"), followed by the preposition te and the infinitive. The conjugated verbs indicate the stance of the subject performing or undergoing the action.

- Present progressive: Ik zit te eten ("I am eating [while sitting]"), De was hangt te drogen ("The laundry is drying [while hanging]")
- Past progressive: Ik lag te lezen ("I was reading [while lying]"), Ik stond te kijken ("I was watching [while standing]")
- Future progressive: Ik zal zitten werken ("I will be working [while sitting]")

Sometimes the meaning of the auxiliary verb is diminished to 'being engaged in'. Take for instance these examples:

- De leraar zit steeds te zeggen dat we moeten luisteren ("The teacher keeps telling us to listen")
- Iedereen loopt te beweren dat het goed was ("Everyone keeps on saying that it was good")
- Zit niet zo te zeuren ("Stop whining")

In these cases, there is generally an undertone of irritation.

=== Slavic languages ===
The Slavic languages make a clear distinction between perfective and imperfective aspects; it was in relation to these languages that the modern concept of aspect originally developed.

In Slavic languages, a given verb is, in itself, either perfective or imperfective. Consequently, each language contains many pairs of verbs, corresponding to each other in meaning, except that one expresses perfective aspect and the other imperfective. (This may be considered a form of lexical aspect.) Perfective verbs are commonly formed from imperfective ones by the addition of a prefix, or else the imperfective verb is formed from the perfective one by modification of the stem or ending. Suppletion also plays a small role. Perfective verbs cannot generally be used with the meaning of a present tense – their present-tense forms in fact have future reference. An example of such a pair of verbs, from Polish, is given below:

- Infinitive (and dictionary form): pisać ("to write", imperfective); napisać ("to write", perfective)
- Present/simple future tense: pisze ("writes"); napisze ("will write", perfective)
- Compound future tense (imperfective only): będzie pisać ("will write, will be writing")
- Past tense: pisał ("was writing, used to write, wrote", imperfective); napisał ("wrote", perfective)

In at least the East Slavic and West Slavic languages, there is a three-way aspect differentiation for verbs of motion with the determinate imperfective, indeterminate imperfective, and perfective. The two forms of imperfective can be used in all three tenses (past, present, and future), but the perfective can only be used with past and future. The indeterminate imperfective expresses habitual aspect (or motion in no single direction), while the determinate imperfective expresses progressive aspect. The difference corresponds closely to that between the English "I (regularly) go to school" and "I am going to school (now)". The three-way difference is given below for the Russian basic (unprefixed) verbs of motion.

When prefixes are attached to Russian verbs of motion they become more or less normal imperfective/perfective pairs, with the indeterminate imperfective becoming the prefixed imperfective and the determinate imperfective becoming the prefixed perfective. For example, prefix при- pri- + indeterminate ходи́ть khodít' = приходи́ть prikhodít' (to arrive (on foot), impf.); and prefix при- pri- + determinate идти́ idtí = прийти prijtí (to arrive (on foot), pf.).

Russian verbs of motion
Imperfective		Perfective	Translation
Indeterminate	Determinate	Perfective	Translation
ходи́ть khodít'	идти́ idtí	пойти́ pojtí	to go by foot (walk)
е́здить jézdit'	е́хать jékhat'	пое́хать pojékhat'	to go by transport (drive, train, bus, etc.)
бе́гать bégat'	бежа́ть bezhát'	побежа́ть pobezhát'	to run
броди́ть brodít'	брести́ brestí	побрести́ pobrestí	to stroll, to wander
гоня́ть gonját'	гнать gnat'	погна́ть pognát'	to chase, to drive (cattle, etc.)
ла́зить lázit'	лезть lezt'	поле́зть polézt'	to climb
лета́ть letát'	лете́ть letét'	полете́ть poletét'	to fly
пла́вать plávat'	плыть plyt'	поплы́ть poplýt'	to swim, to sail
по́лзать pólzat'	ползти́ polztí	поползти́ popolztí	to crawl
вози́ть vozít'	везти́ veztí	повезти́ poveztí	to carry (by vehicle)
носи́ть nosít'	нести́ nestí	понести́ ponestí	to carry, to wear
води́ть vodít'	вести́ vestí	повести́ povestí	to lead, to accompany, to drive (a car)
таска́ть taskát'	тащи́ть tashchít'	потащи́ть potashchít'	to drag, to pull
ката́ть katát'	кати́ть katít'	покати́ть pokatít'	to roll

=== Romance languages ===
Modern Romance languages merge the concepts of aspect and tense but consistently distinguish perfective and imperfective aspects in the past tense. This derives directly from the way the Latin language used to render both aspects and consecutio temporum.

==== Italian ====
Italian language example using the verb mangiare ("to eat"):

Mood: indicativo (indicative)
Tense	Italian	English	Explanation
Presente (Present)	io mangio	"I eat", "I'm eating"	merges habitual and continuous aspects, among others
Passato prossimo (Recent past)	io ho mangiato	"I ate", "I have eaten"	merges perfective and perfect
Imperfetto (Imperfect)	io mangiavo	"I was eating", "I usually ate"	merges habitual and progressive aspects
Trapassato prossimo (Recent pluperfect)	io avevo mangiato	"I had eaten"	tense, not ordinarily marked for aspect
Passato remoto (Far past)	io mangiai	"I ate"	perfective aspect
Trapassato remoto (Far pluperfect)	io ebbi mangiato	"I had eaten"	tense
Futuro semplice (Simple future)	io mangerò	"I shall eat"	tense
Futuro anteriore (Future perfect)	io avrò mangiato	"I shall have eaten"	future tense and perfect tense/aspect

The imperfetto/trapassato prossimo contrasts with the passato remoto/trapassato remoto in that imperfetto renders an imperfective (continuous) past while passato remoto expresses an aorist (punctual/historical) past.

Other aspects in Italian are rendered with other periphrases, like prospective (io sto per mangiare "I'm about to eat", io starò per mangiare "I shall be about to eat"), or continuous/progressive (io sto mangiando "I'm eating", io starò mangiando "I shall be eating").

=== Hindi ===
Hindi has three aspects, habitual aspect, perfective aspect and the progressive aspect. Each of these three aspects are formed from their participles. The aspects of Hindi when conjugated into their personal forms can be put into five grammatical moods: indicative, presumptive, subjunctive, contrafactual, and imperative. In Hindi, the aspect marker is overtly separated from the tense/mood marker. Periphrastic Hindi verb forms consist of two elements. The first of these two elements is the aspect marker. The second element (the copula) is the common tense/mood marker.

There are a couple of verbs which can be used as the copula to the aspectual participles: होना (honā) [to be, happen], रहना (rêhnā) [to stay, remain], आना (ānā) [to come], and जाना (jānā) [to go]. Each of these copulas provide a unique nuance to the aspect. The default (unmarked) copula is होना (honā) [to be]. These copulas can themselves be conjugated into an aspectual participle and used with another copula, hence forming subaspects. (Seeː Hindi verbs)

Simple Aspect	Perfective Aspect			Habitual Aspect				Progressive Aspect		Translation
होना honā	हुआ होना huā honā	हुआ रहना huā rêhnā	हुआ जाना huā jānā	होता होना hotā honā	होता रहना hotā rêhnā	होता आना hotā ānā	होता जाना hotā jānā	हो रहा होना ho rahā honā	हो रहा रहना ho rahā rêhnā	to happen
करना karnā	किया होना kiyā honā	किया रहना kiyā rêhnā	किया जाना kiyā jānā	करता होना kartā honā	करता रहना kartā rêhnā	करता आना kartā ānā	करता जाना kartā jānā	कर रहा होना kar rahā honā	कर रहा रहना kar rahā rêhnā	to do
मरना marnā	मरा होना marā honā	मरा रहना marā rêhnā	मरा जाना marā jānā	मरता होना martā honā	मरता रहना martā rêhnā	मरता आना martā ānā	मरता जाना martā jānā	मर रहा होना mar rahā honā	मर रहा रहना mar rahā rêhnā	to die

=== Finnic languages ===
Finnish and Estonian, among others, have a grammatical aspect contrast of telicity between telic and atelic. Telic sentences signal that the intended goal of an action is achieved. Atelic sentences do not signal whether any such goal has been achieved. The aspect is indicated by the case of the object: accusative is telic and partitive is atelic. For example, the (implicit) purpose of shooting is to kill, such that:

- Ammuin karhun -- "I shot the bear (succeeded; it is done)" i.e., "I shot the bear dead".
- Ammuin karhua -- "I shot at the bear" i.e. the bear may have survived.

In rare cases corresponding telic and atelic forms can be unrelated by meaning.

Derivational suffixes exist for various aspects. Examples:

- -ahta- ("once"), as in huudahtaa ("to yell once") (used for emotive verbs like "laugh", "smile", "growl", "bark"; is not used for verbs like "shoot", "say", "drink")
- -ele- "repeatedly" as in ammuskella "to go shooting around"

There are derivational suffixes for verbs, which carry frequentative, momentane, causative, and inchoative aspect meanings. Also, pairs of verbs differing only in transitivity exist.

=== Austronesian languages ===
==== Rapa ====
Rapa is a French Polynesian language of the island of Rapa Iti. Verbs in the indigenous Old Rapa (Note: "Very little of Old Rapa is still spoken, the modern language ('Reo Rapa') has become heavily Tahitianized, and a 'new' Rapa ('New Rapa') is emerging from revitalization efforts. . . .") occur with a TAM (tense, aspect, or mood) marker which can be followed by directional or deictic particles. "The primary tense–aspect markers used in Old Rapa are the imperfective, progressive, perfective, past, imperative, and subjunctive." However, specific tense–aspect–modality (TAM) markers and the type of deictic or directional particle that follows express different types of meaning.

The imperfective TAM particle e "denotes actions that have not yet occurred but are certain to occur, and inherent qualities".

e naku mai te 'āikete anana'i
IPFV come DIR INDEF teacher tomorrow
'The teacher is coming tomorrow.'

e mānea tō pē'ā ra
IPFV pretty DEF woman DEI
'That woman is beautiful.'

The progressive TAM particle e denotes either "action occurring at that exact moment" or "habitual action" when used with deictic particle na, and actions just witnessed and presumed to still be occurring (but "not readily available for the speaker or addressee to see") when used with deictic particle ra.

e 'āikete na 'ōna i te tamariki
IPFV learn DEI 3S ACC INDEF child/children
'He is teaching some children.'

e kai na ou i kota'i kororio eika
IPFV eat DEI 1S ACC one small fish
'I am eating a small fish.'

e tunu na ou i te mīkaka tonga te pōpongi
IPFV cook DEI 1S ACC INDEF taro all INDEF morning
'I cook taro every morning.'

e kaikai ra te kurī i te moa
IPFV eat.continuously DEI INDEF dog ACC INDEF chicken
'The dog is eating a chicken.'

e mate atu ra 'ōna
IPFV die DIR DEI 3S
'She has just died.'

The perfective TAM particle ka denotes actions that have already occurred or have finished. "It can also be used to mark habitual past (i.e., 'used to do something [every day], but no longer do') when used with deictic na."

ka ngurunguru te kurī
PFV growl INDEF dog
'A dog growled.'

ka tākave tō tangata i te mango
PFV kill DEF man ACC INDEF shark
'The man killed the shark.'

ka tunu na ou i te mīkaka tonga te pōpongi
PFV cook DEI 1S ACC INDEF taro all INDEF morning
'I used to cook taro every morning'

"TAM particle i marks past action. It is rarely used as a matrix TAM and is more frequently observed in past embedded clauses."

i komo mātou
PST sleep 1PL.EXCL
'We slept.'

e a'a koe i 'aka-ineine
IPFV what 2S PST CAUS-ready
'What did you prepare?'

==== Hawaiian ====
The Hawaiian language conveys aspect as follows:

- The unmarked verb, frequently used, can indicate habitual aspect or perfective aspect in the past.
- ke + verb + nei is frequently used and conveys the progressive aspect in the present.
- e + verb + ana conveys the progressive aspect in any tense.
- ua + verb conveys the perfective aspect but is frequently omitted.

==== Wuvulu ====
Wuvulu is a minority language spoken in the Pacific. The Wuvulu verbal aspect is hard to organize because of its number of morpheme combinations and the interaction of semantics between morphemes. Perfective, imperfective negation, simultaneous and habitual are four aspects markers in Wuvulu language.

- Perfective: The perfective marker -li indicates the action is done before another action.

maʔua ʔi=na-li-ware-fa-rawani ʔaʔa roʔou, Barafi
but 3SG=REAL-PERF-talk-CAUS-good with them Barafi
'But, Barafi had already clearly told them.'

- Imperfect negation: The marker ta- indicates the action has not done and also doesn't show anything about the action will be done in the future.

ʔi=ta-no-mai
3SG=not.yet-move-DIR
'It has not yet come.'

- Simultaneous: The marker fi indicates the two actions are done at the same time or one action occurs while other action is in progress.

ʔi=na-panaro-puluʔi-na ruapalo ʔei pani Puleafo ma ʔi=fi-unu
3SG=REAL-hold-together-TR two the.PL hand Puleafo and 3SG=SIM-drink
'He held together the two hands of Puleafo while drinking.' (Note: marker ta- is only for singular subject. When the subject is dual or plural, the marker ʔei and i- are used in same situation.)

- Habitual: The marker fane- can indicate a habitual activity, which means "keep doing something" in English. Example:

ʔi=na-fane-naranara fei nara Faninilo ba, ʔaleʔena ba ini liai mei ramaʔa mei
3SG=REAL-HAB-think(REDUP) the thought Faninilo COMP like COMP who again the person the
'And the thought kept occurring to Faninilo, "who is this particular person?"'

==== Tokelauan ====
There are three types of aspects one must consider when analyzing the Tokelauan language: inherent aspect, situation aspect, and viewpoint aspect.

The inherent aspect describes the purpose of a verb and what separates verbs from one another. According to Vendler, inherent aspect can be categorized into four different types: activities, achievements, accomplishments, and states. Simple activities include verbs such as pull, jump, and punch. Some achievements are continue and win. Drive-a-car is an accomplishment while hate is an example of a state. Another way to recognize a state inherent aspect is to note whether or not it changes. For example, if someone were to hate vegetables because they are allergic, this state of hate is unchanging and thus, a state inherent aspect. On the other hand, an achievement, unlike a state, only lasts for a short amount of time. Achievement is the highpoint of an action.

Another type of aspect is situation aspect. Situation aspect is described to be what one is experiencing in his or her life through that circumstance. Therefore, it is his or her understanding of the situation. Situation aspect are abstract terms that are not physically tangible. They are also used based upon one's point of view. For example, a professor may say that a student who comes a minute before each class starts is a punctual student. Based upon the professor's judgment of what punctuality is, he or she may make that assumption of the situation with the student. Situation aspect is firstly divided into states and occurrences, then later subdivided under occurrences into processes and events, and lastly, under events, there are accomplishments and achievements.

The third type of aspect is viewpoint aspect. Viewpoint aspect can be likened to situation aspect such that they both take into consideration one's inferences. However, viewpoint aspect diverges from situation aspect because it is where one decides to view or see such event. A perfect example is the glass metaphor: Is the glass half full or is it half empty. The choice of being half full represents an optimistic viewpoint while the choice of being half empty represents a pessimistic viewpoint. Not only does viewpoint aspect separate into negative and positive, but rather different point of views. Having two people describe a painting can bring about two different viewpoints. One may describe a situation aspect as a perfect or imperfect. A perfect situation aspect entails an event with no reference to time, while an imperfect situation aspect makes a reference to time with the observation.

==== Torau ====
Aspect in Torau is marked with post-verbal particles or clitics. While the system for marking the imperfective aspect is complex and highly developed, it is unclear if Torau marks the perfective and neutral viewpoints. The imperfective clitics index one of the core arguments, usually the nominative subject, and follow the rightmost element in a syntactic structure larger than the word. The two distinct forms for marking the imperfective aspect are (i)sa- and e-. While more work needs to be done on this language, the preliminary hypothesis is that (i)sa- encodes the stative imperfective and e- encodes the active imperfective. Reduplication always cooccurs with e-, but it usually does not with (i)sa-. This example below shows these two imperfective aspect markers giving different meanings to similar sentences.

Pita ma-to mate=sa-la.
Peter REAL.3SG.SUBJ-PST be.dead=IPFV-3SG
'Peter was dead.'

Pita ma-to maa≈mate=e-la.
Peter REAL.3SG.SUBJ-PST {REDUP}≈be.dead=IPFV-3SG
'Peter was dying.'

In Torau, the suffix -to, which must attach to a preverbal particle, may indicate similar meaning to the perfective aspect. In realis clauses, this suffix conveys an event that is entirely in the past and no longer occurring. When -to is used in irrealis clauses, the speaker conveys that the event will definitely occur (Palmer, 2007). Although this suffix is not explicitly stated as a perfective viewpoint marker, the meaning that it contributes is very similar to the perfective viewpoint.

==== Malay/Indonesian ====
Like many Austronesian languages, the verbs of the Malay language follow a system of affixes to express changes in meaning. To express the aspects, Malay uses a number of auxiliary verbs:

- sudah: perfective, 'saya sudah makan' = 'I have [already] eaten'
- baru: near perfective, 'saya baru makan' = 'I have just eaten'
- belum: imperfective, 'saya belum makan' = 'I have not eaten'
- sedang: progressive not implicating an end
- masih: progressive implicating an end
- pernah: semelfactive

==== Philippine languages ====
Like many Austronesian languages, the verbs of the Philippine languages follow a complex system of affixes to express subtle changes in meaning. However, the verbs in this family of languages are conjugated to express the aspects and not the tenses. Though many of the Philippine languages do not have a fully codified grammar, most of them follow the verb aspects that are demonstrated by Filipino or Tagalog.

=== Creole languages ===
Creole languages typically use the unmarked verb for timeless habitual aspect, or for stative aspect, or for perfective aspect in the past. Invariant pre-verbal markers are often used. Non-stative verbs typically can optionally be marked for the progressive, habitual, completive, or irrealis aspect. The progressive in English-based Atlantic Creoles often uses de (from English "be"). Jamaican Creole uses a (from English "are") or de for the present progressive and a combination of the past time marker (did, behn, ehn or wehn) and the progressive marker (a or de) for the past progressive (e.g. did a or wehn de). Haitian Creole uses the progressive marker ap. Some Atlantic Creoles use one marker for both the habitual and progressive aspects. In Tok Pisin, the optional progressive marker follows the verb. Completive markers tend to come from superstrate words like "done" or "finish", and some creoles model the future/irrealis marker on the superstrate word for "go".

=== American Sign Language ===
American Sign Language (ASL) is similar to many other sign languages in that it has no grammatical tense but many verbal aspects produced by modifying the base verb sign.

An example is illustrated with the verb TELL. The basic form of this sign is produced with the initial posture of the index finger on the chin, followed by a movement of the hand and finger tip toward the indirect object (the recipient of the telling). Inflected into the unrealized inceptive aspect ("to be just about to tell"), the sign begins with the hand moving from in front of the trunk in an arc to the initial posture of the base sign (i.e., index finger touching the chin) while inhaling through the mouth, dropping the jaw, and directing eye gaze toward the verb's object. The posture is then held rather than moved toward the indirect object. During the hold, the signer also stops the breath by closing the glottis. Other verbs (such as "look at", "wash the dishes", "yell", "flirt") are inflected into the unrealized inceptive aspect similarly: The hands used in the base sign move in an arc from in front of the trunk to the initial posture of the underlying verb sign while inhaling, dropping the jaw, and directing eye gaze toward the verb's object (if any), but subsequent movements and postures are dropped as the posture and breath are held.

Other aspects in ASL include the following: stative, inchoative ("to begin to..."), predispositional ("to tend to..."), susceptative ("to... easily"), frequentative ("to... often"), protractive ("to... continuously"), incessant ("to... incessantly"), durative ("to... for a long time"), iterative ("to... over and over again"), intensive ("to... very much"), resultative ("to... completely"), approximative ("to... somewhat"), semblitive ("to appear to..."), increasing ("to... more and more"). Some aspects combine with others to create yet finer distinctions.

Aspect is unusual in ASL in that transitive verbs derived for aspect lose their grammatical transitivity. They remain semantically transitive, typically assuming an object made prominent using a topic marker or mentioned in a previous sentence. See Syntax in ASL for details.

== Terms for various aspects ==
The following aspectual terms are found in the literature. Approximate English equivalents are given.

- Perfective: 'I struck the bell' (an event viewed in its entirety, without reference to its temporal structure during its occurrence)
  - Momentane/semelfactive: 'The mouse squeaked once' (contrasted to 'The mouse squeaked / was squeaking')
- Perfect (a common conflation of aspect and tense): 'I have arrived' (brings attention to the consequences of a situation in the past)
  - Recent perfect, also known as after perfect: 'I just ate' or 'I am after eating' (Hiberno-English)
- Discontinuous past: In English a sentence such as "I put it on the table" is neutral in implication (the object could still be on the table or not), but in some languages such as Chichewa the equivalent tense carries an implication that the object is no longer there. It is thus the opposite of the perfect aspect.
- Prospective (a conflation of aspect and tense): 'He is about to fall', 'I am going to cry" (brings attention to the anticipation of a future situation)
- Imperfective (an activity with ongoing nature: combines the meanings of both the continuous and the habitual aspects): 'I was walking to work' (continuous) or 'I walked (used to walk, would walk) to work every day' (habitual).
  - Habitual: 'I used to walk home from work', 'I would walk home from work every day', 'I walk home from work every day' (a subtype of imperfective)
  - Continuous: 'I am eating' or 'I know' (situation is described as ongoing and either evolving or unevolving; a subtype of imperfective)
    - Progressive: 'I am eating' (action is described as ongoing and evolving; a subtype of continuous)
    - Stative: 'I know French' (situation is described as ongoing but not evolving; a subtype of continuous)
- Gnomic/generic: 'Fish swim and birds fly' (general truths)
- Episodic: 'The bird flew' (non-gnomic)
- Continuative: 'I am still eating'
- Inceptive/ingressive: 'I started to run' (beginning of a new action: dynamic)
- Inchoative: 'The flowers started to bloom' (beginning of a new state: static)
- Terminative/cessative: 'I finished eating/reading'
- Defective: 'I almost fell'
- Pausative: 'I stopped working for a while'
- Resumptive: 'I resumed sleeping'
- Punctual: 'I slept'
- Durative/Delimitative: 'I slept for a while'
- Protractive: 'The argument went on and on'
- Iterative: 'I read the same books again and again'
- Frequentative: 'It sparkled', contrasted with 'It sparked'. Or, 'I run around', vs. 'I run'
- Experiential: 'I have gone to school many times' (see for example Chinese aspects)
- Intentional: 'I listened carefully'
- Accidental: 'I accidentally knocked over the chair'
- Intensive: 'It glared'
- Attenuative: 'It glimmered'
- Segmentative: 'It is coming out in successive multitudes'

== See also ==
- Aktionsart
- Ancient Greek grammar § Time and aspect
- Chinese grammar § Aspects
- Grammatical conjugation
- Grammatical tense
- Grammatical mood
- Nominal TAM (tense–aspect–mood)
- Tense–aspect–mood

== Other references ==
- Routledge Dictionary of Language and Linguistics (ISBN 0-415-20319-8), by Hadumod Bussmann, edited by Gregory P. Trauth and Kerstin Kazzazi, Routledge, London 1996. Translation of German Lexikon der Sprachwissenschaft Kröner Verlag, Stuttgart 1990.
- Morfofonologian harjoituksia, Lauri Carlson
- Bache, C (1982). "Aspect and Aktionsart: Towards a semantic distinction". Journal of Linguistics. 18 (1): 57–72. doi:10.1017/s0022226700007234. S2CID 144397004.
- Berdinetto, P. M., & Delfitto, D. (2000). "Aspect vs. Actionality: Some reasons for keeping them apart". In O. Dahl (Ed.), Tense and Aspect in the Languages of Europe (pp. 189–226). Berlin: Mouton de Gruyter.
- Binnick, R. I. (1991). Time and the verb: A guide to tense and aspect. New York: Oxford University Press.
- Binnick, R. I. (2006). "Aspect and Aspectuality". In B. Aarts & A. M. S. McMahon (Eds.), The Handbook of English Linguistics (pp. 244–268). Malden, MA: Blackwell Publishing.
- Chertkova, M. Y. (2004). ""Vid or Aspect? On the Typology of a Slavic and Romance Category" [Using Russian and Spanish Material]". Vestnik Moskovskogo Universiteta, Filologiya. 58 (9–1): 97–122.
- Comrie, B. (1976). Aspect: An introduction to the study of verbal aspect and related problems. Cambridge; New York: Cambridge University Press.
- Frawley, W. (1992). Linguistic semantics. Hillsdale, NJ: Lawrence Erlbaum Associates.
- Johanson, Lars (2023) "Aspect in the languages of Europe". Ankara: Nobel.
- Kabakciev, K. (2000). Aspect in English: a "common-sense" view of the interplay between verbal and nominal referents (Studies in Linguistics and Philosophy). Springer. Retrieved 2016-05-18.
- Kortmann, B (1991). "The Triad 'Tense–Aspect–Aktionsart'". Belgian Journal of Linguistics. 6: 9–30. doi:10.1075/bjl.6.02kor.
- MacDonald, J. E. (2008). The syntactic nature of inner aspect: A minimalist perspective. Amsterdam; Philadelphia: John Benjamins Pub. Co.
- Maslov, I. S. (1998). "Vid glagol'nyj" ["Aspect of the verb"]. In V. N. Yartseva (Ed.), Jazykoznanie: Bol'shoj entsyklopedicheskij slovar' (pp. 83–84). Moscow: Bol'shaja Rossijskaja Entsyklopedija.
- Richardson, K. (2007). Case and aspect in Slavic. Oxford; New York: Oxford University Press.
- Sasse, H.-J. (2002). "Recent activity in the theory of aspect: Accomplishments, achievements, or just non-progressive state?" (PDF). Linguistic Typology. 6 (2): 199–271. doi:10.1515/lity.2002.007.
- Sasse, H.-J. (2006). "Aspect and Aktionsart". In E. K. Brown (Ed.), Encyclopedia of language and linguistics (Vol. 1, pp. 535–538). Boston: Elsevier.
- Smith, Carlota S. (1991). The parameter of aspect. Dordrecht; Boston: Kluwer Academic Publishers.
- Tatevosov, S (2002). "The parameter of actionality". Linguistic Typology. 6 (3): 317–401. doi:10.1515/lity.2003.003.
- Travis, Lisa deMena (2010). "Inner aspect", Dordrecht, Springer..
- Verkuyl, H. (1972). On the Compositional Nature of the Aspects, Reidel, Dordrecht.
- Verkuyl, H. (1993). A Theory of Aspectuality: the interaction between temporal and atemporal structure. Cambridge: Cambridge University Press.
- Verkuyl, H. (2005). "How (in-)sensitive is tense to aspectual information?" In B. Hollebrandse, A. van Hout & C. Vet (Eds.), Crosslinguistic views on tense, aspect and modality (pp. 145–169). Amsterdam: Rodopi.
- Zalizniak, A. A., & Shmelev, A. D. (2000). Vvedenie v russkuiu aspektologiiu [Introduction to Russian aspectology]. Moskva: IAzyki russkoi kul’tury.
