= Gnomic aspect =

Grammatical feature used to express general truths or aphorisms

The gnomic (abbreviated GNO), also called neutral, generic, or universal aspect, mood, or tense, is a grammatical feature (which may refer to aspect, mood, or tense) that expresses general truths or aphorisms.

== Uses and occurrence ==
Used to describe an aspect, the gnomic is considered neutral by not limiting the flow of time to any particular conception (for example, the conceptions of time as continuous, habitual, perfective, etc.). Used to describe a mood, the gnomic is considered neutral by not limiting the expression of words to the speaker's attitude toward them (e.g. as indicative, subjunctive, potential, etc.). Used to describe a tense, the gnomic is considered neutral by not limiting action, in particular, to the past, present, or future. Examples of the gnomic include such generic statements as: "birds fly"; "sugar is sweet"; and "a mother can always tell". (Note: These three examples may all be said to be in the present tense, but it is equally reasonable to consider that tense and temporality are simply not relevant to the examples, as all three express generic truths that are not limited by a specific placement in time or construct regarding the flow of time.) If, as an aspect, it does take temporality into consideration, it may be called the empiric perfect aspect. Generally, though, it is one example of imperfective aspect, which does not view an event as a single entity viewed only as a whole, but instead specifies something about its internal temporal structure.

A grammatical gnomic aspect occurs in literary Swahili, where the -a- form of the verb is gnomic (sometimes called "indefinite tense") and the -na- form of the verb is episodic (sometimes called 'definite tense' or just 'present'). Spanish, Portuguese and Catalan do not have a gnomic inflection in their verbs like Swahili, but they do have lexical aspect in their copulas ser (in Catalan, ser or ésser) (gnomic) and estar (episodic). For instance, estar enfermo (Spanish) estar doente (Portuguese) or estar malalt (Catalan) means to be sick (episodic), whereas ser enfermo (Spanish), ser doente (Portuguese) or ésser malalt (Catalan) means to be sickly (gnomic).

However, most languages use other forms of the verb to express general truths. For instance, English and French use the standard present tense, as in the examples given above. In Classical Greek, Tongan, and Dakota, the future tense is used. Biblical Hebrew uses the perfective aspect. In Japanese, an imperfective clause with the wa (topic) particle is used for generic statements such as:

taiyou-wa higashi-kara nobo-ru
sun-TOP east-from rise-IPFV
"the sun rises in the east"

whereas the ga (subject) particle would force an episodic reading.

== English ==
English has no means of morphologically distinguishing a gnomic aspect; however, a generic reference is generally understood to convey an equivalent meaning. Use of the definite article "the" or a demonstrative determiner usually implies specific individuals, as in "the car he owns is fast", "the cars he owns are fast", or "those rabbits are fast", whereas omitting the definite article or other determiner in the plural creates a generic reference: "rabbits are fast" describes rabbits in general. However, the definite article may also be used in the singular for classes of nouns, as in "The giraffe is the tallest land mammal living today", which does not refer to any specific giraffe, but to giraffes in general.

English generally uses the simple present construction to express the gnomic aspect, as in "rabbits are fast" and "water boils at 212 °F". The simple present is used with specific references for the equivalent of a habitual aspect, as in "I run every day"; likewise, the auxiliary "will" is used with specific references for the habitual aspect, as in "he will make that mistake all the time, won't he?". Thus, in English the gnomic aspect takes the same form as the habitual aspect.

The English "reportive present" tense as seen in newspaper headlines like "Technical Innovations Increase Efficiency, Lower Costs" can be viewed as gnomic.

== Ancient Greek ==
In Ancient Greek, a general truth may be expressed in the present imperfective, future, or aorist, which are then called the gnomic present, the gnomic future, and the gnomic aorist. There is also a gnomic perfect. They are not distinct tenses but simply uses of the tense.

A gnomic future, the rarest of the three usages, similarly states that certain events often occur and does not imply that an event is going to occur. A gnomic aorist (the most common of the three usages) likewise expresses the tendency for certain events to occur under given circumstances and is used to express general maxims. The gnomic aorist is thought to derive (like the English example) from the summation of a common story (such as the moral of a fable).
