= Boundedness (linguistics) =

Whether a word specifies the time/location/quantity of what it references or not

In linguistics, boundedness is a semantic feature that relates to an understanding of the referential limits of a lexical item. Fundamentally, words that specify a spatio-temporal demarcation of their reference are considered bounded, while words that allow for a fluidly interpretable referent are considered unbounded. This distinction also relies on the divisibility of the lexical item's referent into distinct segments, or strata. Though this feature most often distinguishes countability in nouns and aspect in verbs, it applies more generally to any syntactic category.

== Boundedness in verbs ==
For verbs, certain grammatical aspects express boundedness.

Boundedness is characteristic of perfective aspects such as the Ancient Greek aorist and the Spanish preterite. The simple past of English commonly expresses a bounded event ("I found out"), but sometimes expresses, for example, a stative ("I knew").

The perfective aspect often includes a contextual variation similar to an inchoative aspect or verb, and expresses the beginning of a state.

In German, the modal particle "mal" can be used to express that the speaker renounces the exactness and temporal unambiguity of the action of the verb, favoring vagueness and non-commitment.

== Boundedness in nouns ==
In order for a noun to be semantically bounded, its referent item, whether tangible or abstract, must have clearly defined limits on the extent and content of what it encompasses. Structurally, bounded and unbounded nouns correlate to a number of descriptive criteria. The first criterion is internal homogeneity; while the referent of bounded nouns can be composed of distinct segments, an unbounded noun typically refers to something which is considered a cohesive expanse. The next criteria are the interrelated concepts of expansibility and replicability. Because unbounded nouns refer to internally homogeneous referents, any part of their expansive referent could be analyzed as an instance of that noun. Further, any removal of the expanse does not change the applicability of the noun to its referent. These two qualities are not possible of bounded nouns.

Note that boundedness in nouns should not be thought of as synonymous with countability. Rather, boundedness is an underlying semantic distinction that motivates countability.

== See also ==
- Lexical aspect
- Grammatical aspect
