= Aorist =

Verb form that usually expresses perfective aspect and refers to past events

Aorist (Note: /ˈeɪərɪst/ AY-ər-ist, /ˈɛər-/ AIR-) (abbreviated aor) verb forms usually express perfective aspect and refer to past events, similar to a preterite. Ancient Greek grammar had the aorist form, and the grammars of other Indo-European languages and languages influenced by the Indo-European grammatical tradition, such as Middle Persian, Sanskrit, Armenian, the South Slavic languages, Georgian, Pontic Greek, and Pashto, also have forms referred to as aorist.

The word comes from Ancient Greek ἀόριστος (aóristos 'indefinite'), as the aorist was the unmarked (default) form of the verb, and thus did not have the implications of the imperfective aspect, which referred to an ongoing or repeated situation, or the perfect, which referred to a situation with a continuing relevance; instead it described an action "pure and simple".

Because the aorist was the unmarked aspect in Ancient Greek, the term is sometimes applied to unmarked verb forms in other languages, such as the habitual aspect in Turkish.

== Indo-European languages ==
=== Proto-Indo-European ===
In Proto-Indo-European, the aorist appears to have originated as a series of verb forms expressing manner of action. Proto-Indo-European had a three-way aspectual opposition, traditionally called "present", "aorist", and "perfect", which are thought to have been, respectively, imperfective, perfective, and stative (resultant state) aspects. By the time of Classical Greek, this system was maintained largely in independent instances of the non-indicative moods and in the nonfinite forms. But in the indicative, and in dependent clauses with the subjunctive and optative, the aspects took on temporal significance. In this manner, the aorist was often used as an unmarked past tense, and the perfect came to develop a resultative use, which is why the term perfect is used for this meaning in modern languages.

Other Indo-European languages lost the aorist entirely. In the development of Latin, for example, the aorist merged with the perfect. The preterites (past perfectives) of the Romance languages, which are sometimes called "aorist", are an independent development from the Latin perfect.

=== Greek ===
In Ancient Greek, the indicative aorist is one of the two main forms used in telling a story; it is used for undivided events, such as the individual steps in a continuous process (narrative aorist); it is also used for events that took place before the story itself (past-within-past). The aorist indicative is also used to express things that happen in general, without asserting a time (the "gnomic aorist"). It can also be used of present and future events; the aorist also has several specialized senses meaning present action.

Non-indicative forms of the aorist (subjunctives, optatives, imperatives, infinitives) are usually purely aspectual, with certain exceptions including indirect speech constructions and the use of optative as part of the sequence of tenses in dependent clauses. There are aorist infinitives and imperatives that do not imply temporality at all. For example, the Lord's Prayer in Matthew 6:11 uses the aorist imperative in "Give (δός dós) us this day our daily bread", in contrast to the analogous passage in Luke 11:3, which uses the imperfective aspect, implying repetition, with "Give (δίδου dídou, present imperative) us day by day our daily bread."

An example of how the aorist tense contrasts with the imperfect in describing the past occurs in Xenophon's Anabasis, when the Persian aristocrat Orontas is executed: "and those who had been previously in the habit of bowing (προσεκύνουν prosekúnoun, imperfect) to him, bowed (προσεκύνησαν prosekúnēsan, aorist) to him even then." Here the imperfect refers to a past habitual or repeated act, and the aorist to a single one.

There is disagreement as to which functions of the Greek aorist are inherent within it. Some of the disagreement applies to the history of the development of the various functions and forms. Most grammarians differentiate the aorist indicative from the non-indicative aorists. Many authors hold that the aorist tends to be about the past because it is perfective, and perfectives tend to describe completed actions; others that the aorist indicative and to some extent the participle is essentially a mixture of past tense and perfective aspect.

==== Hermeneutic implications ====
Because the aorist was not maintained in either Latin or the Germanic languages, there have long been difficulties in translating the Greek New Testament into Western languages. The aorist has often been interpreted as making a strong statement about the aspect or even the time of an event, when, in fact, due to its being the unmarked (default) form of the Greek verb, such implications are often left to context. Thus, within New Testament hermeneutics, it is considered an exegetical fallacy to attach undue significance to uses of the aorist. Although one may draw specific implications from an author's use of the imperfective or perfect, no such conclusions can, in general, be drawn from the use of the aorist, which may refer to an action "without specifying whether the action is unique, repeated, ingressive, instantaneous, past, or accomplished." In particular, the aorist does not imply a "once-for-all" action, as it has commonly been misinterpreted, although it frequently refers to a simple, non-repeated action.

=== Sanskrit ===
Although quite common in older Sanskrit, the aorist is comparatively infrequent in much of classical Sanskrit, occurring, for example, 66 times in the first book of the Rāmāyaṇa, 8 times in the Hitopadeśa, 6 times in the Bhagavad-Gītā, and 6 times in the story of Śakuntalā in the Mahābhārata.

In the later language, the aorist indicative had the value of a preterite, while in the older language it was closer in sense to the perfect. The aorist was also used with the ancient injunctive mood, particularly in prohibitions.

=== Slavic languages ===
The Indo-European aorist was inherited by the Slavic languages but has survived intact only in the South Slavic languages. It retains its function entirely in the Eastern South Slavic languages, Bulgarian and Macedonian. However, in Western South Slavic languages it has become, along with the imperfect and pluperfect, largely obsolete in daily parlance and mostly superseded by the perfect and circumlocution. The aorist is part of the standardized varieties of Serbo-Croatian but is no longer part of standard Slovene. In both languages, the aorist appears mostly in older literature, scripture, religious services and legislation and so carries an archaic tone. In Serbo-Croatian, aorist finds natural use only in certain locales while it is completely supplanted by the perfect in others. As such, its use in formal settings can be construed as either pretentious and bombastic or conversely as rustic and unsophisticated, depending on locale. Its disuse does not cause ambiguity, as Slavic verbs have distinct grammatical aspects to convey related yet distinct meaning.

In modern forms of communication, the aorist has experienced something of a revival among younger speakers in Serbia, as its forms are simpler and shorter to type out than the perfect.

In Bulgarian, which has produced a new regular formation, the aorist is used in indirect and in presumptive quotations. Bulgarian has separate inflections for aorist (past imperfective) and general perfective. The aorist may be used with the imperfective to produce a compound perfective–imperfective aspect.

The aorist in Macedonian is called the "past definite complete tense" (минато определено свршено време) and refers to a completed action in the past tense. It most often corresponds to the simple past tense in English: I read the book, I wrote the letter, I ate my supper, etc. In contemporary standard Macedonian, the aorist is formed almost exclusively from perfective verbs. The formation of the aorist for most verbs is not complex, but there are numerous small subcategories that must be learned: complexities in the aorist stem vowel and possible consonant alternations. All verbs (except сум) take the same endings in the aorist:

| јас -в | ние -вме |
| ти -∅ / -ше | вие -вте |
| тој -∅ / -ше | тие -а / -ја |

(The sign ∅ indicates a zero ending: nothing is added after the stem vowel.)

=== Morphology ===
In the Indo-European languages Greek and Sanskrit, the aorist stem is marked by several morphological devices (the aorist indicative also has the past-tense augment ἐ- e-, which contracts with the initial vowel). Three aorist morphological devices stand out as most common:

| Morphology | Description, examples of aorist tense and aorist imperative |
|---|---|
| suffixing of s | The first, weak, s-, or sigmatic aorist is the most common in Greek.: ἀκούω akoúō "I hear"—ἤκουσα ḗkousa "I heard"—ἄκουσον ákouson "Hear!" |
| zero-grade of ablaut, lack of suffix / nasal infix | The second or strong aorist uses the bare root of the verb without the e of ablaut or the present-tense suffix or nasal infix.: λείπω leípō "I leave"—ἔλιπον élipon "I left"—λίπε lípe "Leave!"; λαμβάνω lambánō "I take"—ἔλαβον élabon "I took"—λαβέ labé "Take!" |
| reduplication | Reduplication is more common in the perfect, but a few Greek verbs use it in the aorist. The reduplicated aorist is more common in Sanskrit, e.g. ájījanam "I gave birth.": ἄγω ágō "I lead"—ἤγαγον ḗgagon "I led"—ἄγαγε ágage "Lead!" |

== South Caucasian languages ==
In Georgian and Svan, the aorist marks perfective aspect. In the indicative, it marks completed events. In other moods, it marks events that are yet to be completed.

In Mingrelian and Laz, the aorist is basically a past tense and can be combined with both perfective and imperfective aspects as well as the imperative and the subjunctive moods.

== Northeast Caucasian languages ==
In Khinalug, the aorist is a perfective aspect, and the two terms ("aorist" and "perfective") are often used interchangeably.

In Udi, the aorist is an imperfective aspect that is usually a past tense but can also replace the present tense.

== Turkish ==
In Turkish, the aorist (Turkish: geniş zaman, literally "broad time") is a habitual aspect and is similar to the English present simple. For example, the statement Et yemem ("I do not eat meat") informs the listener that the speaker is a vegetarian and not merely that they happen not to be eating meat at that very moment. To convey the latter message, the present progressive Et yemiyorum ("I am not eating meat") would be appropriate. The Turkish aorist is commonly used in enquiries about someone's wishes, as in Bir şey yemek ister misiniz? ("Would you like to eat something?"). That makes a question like Domuz eti yer misiniz? ambiguous, as the listener may interpret it as an informational question ("Are you someone who eats pork"?) or as an offer ("Would you [like to] eat pork?").

== Constructed languages ==
In J. R. R. Tolkien's constructed language Quenya, the aorist is a gnomic tense or simple present that expresses general facts or simple present actions.

== See also ==
- Ancient Greek grammar § Mood of the dependent verb
- Preterite
