= Imperfective aspect =

Grammatical aspect of continuity or repetition

The imperfective (abbreviated impf, npfv, ipfv, or more ambiguously impv) is a grammatical aspect used for ongoing, habitual, repeated, or similar semantic roles, whether they are in the past, present, or future. Many languages have a general imperfective; others have distinct aspects for specific roles such as progressive, habitual, and iterative. The imperfective contrasts with the perfective, which is used for actions as a complete whole.

== English ==
English has no general imperfective. The English progressive is used to describe ongoing events, but can also be used in past tense, such as "The rain was beating down". Habitual situations do not have their own verb form (in most dialects), but the construction "used to" conveys past habitual action, as in I used to ski. The simple past tense can be used for situations presented as ongoing, such as The rain beat down continuously through the night.

The progressive and imperfective contrast in stative verbs. Stative verbs, such as know, do not use the progressive (*I was knowing Ada), while in many languages with an imperfective (for instance, French), they do (je connaissais Ada).

== Indo-Aryan languages ==
Verbs in Hindi-Urdu (Hindustani) have their grammatical aspects overtly marked. Periphrastic Hindi-Urdu verb forms (participle verb forms) consist of two elements, the first of these two elements is the aspect marker and the second element (the copula) is the common tense-mood marker. There are two independent imperfective aspects in Hindi-Urdu: Habitual Aspect, and Progressive Aspect. These two aspects are formed from their participle forms being used with the copula verb of Hindi which is होना honā (to be). However, the aspectual participles can also have the verbs रहना rêhnā (to stay/remain), आना ānā (to come) & जाना jānā (to go) as their copula. The table below shows three verbs होना honā (to be), करना karnā (to do), and मरना marnā (to die) in their aspectual infinitive forms using different copulas.

Simple Aspect	Imperfective Aspect					
Simple Aspect	Habitual Aspect				Progressive Aspect	
होना honā to be	होता होना hotā honā to happen	होता रहना hotā rêhnā to keep happening	होता जाना hotā jānā to keep on happening	होता आना hotā ānā to have been happening	हो रहा होना ho rahā honā to be happening	हो रहा रहना ho rahā rêhnā to stay happening
करना karnā to do	करता होना kartā honā to be doing	करता रहना kartā rêhnā to stay doing	करता जाना kartā jānā to keep doing	करता आना kartā ānā to have been doing	कर रहा होना kar rahā honā to be doing	कर रहा रहना kar rahā rêhnā to stay doing
मरना marnā to die	मरता होना martā honā to be dying	मरता रहना martā rêhnā to stay dying	मरता जाना martā jānā to keep dying	मरता आना martā ānā to have been dying	मरा रहा होना mar rahā honā to be dying	मर रहा रहना mar rahā rêhnā to stay dying

Some translations are approximate, and the nuance cannot be expressed exactly in English. Some aspectual forms also have the same translations in English but are not interchangeable in Hindi-Urdu.

Now, these copula verbs (besides होना honā) can themselves be converted into their participle forms and put into one of the three different aspects of Hindi-Urdu, which are habitual, progressive, and perfective aspects, hence generating sub-aspectual infinitive forms. This way a verb form combining two grammatical aspects is constructed. The table below shows the combined aspectual forms:

Imperfective Aspect
Habitual Aspect						Progressive Aspect
रहना (rêhnā)			जाना (jānā)		आना (ānā)	रहना (rêhnā)
Habitual subaspect	Perfective subaspect	Progressive subaspect	Habitual subaspect	Progressive subaspect	Progressive subaspect	Habitual subaspect
होता रहता होना hotā rêhtā honā to regularly keep happening	होता रहा होना hotā rahā honā to have been regularly happening	होता रह रहा होना hotā rêh rahā honā to stay being happening	होता जाता होना hotā jātā honā to continuously keep happening	होता जा रहा होना hotā jā rahā honā to continuously keep happening	होता आ रहा होना hotā ā rahā honā to have been continuously kept happening	हो रहा रहता होना ho rahā rêhtā honā to continuously stay happening progressively
करता रहता होना kartā rêhtā honā to regularly keep doing	करता रहा होना kartā rahā honā to have been regularly doing	करता रह रहा होना kartā rêh rahā honā to stay being doing	करता जाता होना kartā jātā honā to continuously keep doing	करता जा रहा होना kartā jā rahā honā to continuously keep doing	करता आ रहा होना kartā ā rahā honā to have been continuously kept doing	कर रहा रहता होना kar rahā rêhtā honā to continuously stay doing progressively
मरता रहता होना martā rêhtā honā to regularly keep dying	मरता रहा होना martā rahā honā to have been regularly dying	मरता रह रहा होना martā rêh rahā honā to stay being dying	मरता जाता होना martā jātā honā to continuously keep dying	मरता जा रहा होना martā jā rahā honā to continuously keep dying	मरता आ रहा होना martā ā rahā honā to have been continuously kept dying	मर रहा रहता होना mar rahā rêhtā honā to continuously stay dying progressively

The perfective subaspect of the habitual main aspect (habitual) also is imperfective (habitual). Also, these sub-aspects are even more nuanced that it is not possible to translate each of them into English in a unique way. Some translations don't even make sense in English.

== Slavic languages ==
Verbs in Slavic languages have a perfective and/or an imperfective form. Generally, any of various prefixes can turn imperfectives into perfectives; suffixes can turn perfectives into imperfectives. The non-past imperfective form is used for the present, while its perfective counterpart is used for the future. There is also a periphrastic imperfective future construction.

== Other languages ==
The imperfective aspect may be fused with the past tense, for a form traditionally called the imperfect. In some cases, such as Spanish and Portuguese, this is because the imperfective aspect occurs only in the past tense; others, such as Georgian and Bulgarian, have both general imperfectives and imperfects. Other languages with distinct past imperfectives include Latin and Persian.

== Perfective ==
The opposite aspect is the perfective (in Ancient Greek, generally called the aorist), which views a situation as a simple whole, without interior composition. (This is not the same as the perfect.) Unlike most other tense–aspect category oppositions, it is typical for a language not to choose either perfective or imperfective as being generally marked and the other as being generally unmarked.

In narrative, one of the uses of the imperfective is to set the background scene ("It was midnight. The room was dark. The rain was beating down. Water was streaming in through a broken window. A gun lay on the table."), with the perfective describing foregrounded actions within that scene ("Suddenly, a man burst into the room, ran over to the table, and grabbed the gun.").

English does not have these aspects. However, the background-action contrast provides a decent approximation in English:

"John was reading when I entered."

Here 'entered' presents "the totality of the situation referred to [...]: the whole of the situation is presented as a single unanalysable whole, with beginning, middle, and end all rolled into one; no attempt is made to divide this situation up into the various individual phases that make up the action of entry." This is the essence of the perfective aspect: an event presented as an unanalyzed whole.

'Was reading', however, is different. Besides being the background to 'entered', the form 'reading' presents "an internal portion of John's reading, [with] no explicit reference to the beginning or to the end of his reading." This is the essence of the imperfective aspect. Or, to continue the quotation, "the perfective looks at the situation from the outside, without necessarily distinguishing any of the internal structure of the situation, whereas the imperfective looks at the situation from inside, and as such is crucially concerned with the internal structure of the situation, since it can both look backwards towards the start of the situation, and look forwards to the end of the situation, and indeed it is equally appropriate if the situation is one that lasts through all time, without any beginning and without any end."

This is why, within the past tense, perfective verbs are typically translated into English as simple past, like 'entered', whereas imperfective verbs are typically translated as 'was reading', 'used to read', and the like. (In English, it is easiest to illustrate aspect in the past tense. However, any tense is possible: Present "John is reading as I enter", future "John will be reading when I enter", etc.: In each tense, the aspectual distinction is the same.)

This aspectual distinction is not inherent to the events themselves, but is decided by how the speaker views them or wishes to present them. The very same event may be described as perfective in one clause, and then imperfective in the next. For example,

"John read that book yesterday; while he was reading it, the postman came,"

where the two forms of 'to read' refer to the same thing. In 'John read that book yesterday', however, John's reading is presented as a complete event, without further subdivision into successive temporal phases; while in 'while he was reading it', this event is opened up, so that the speaker is now in the middle of the situation of John's reading, as it is in the middle of this reading that the postman arrives.

The perfective and imperfective need not occur together in the same utterance; indeed they more often do not. However, it is difficult to describe them in English without an explicit contrast like "John was reading when I entered."

=== Combination ===
The two aspects may be combined on the same verb in a few languages, for perfective imperfectives and imperfective perfectives. Georgian and Bulgarian, for example, have parallel perfective-imperfective and aorist-imperfect forms, the latter restricted to the past tense. In Bulgarian, there are parallel perfective and imperfective stems; aorist and imperfect suffixes are typically added to the perfective and imperfective stems, respectively, but the opposite can occur. For example, an imperfect perfective is used in Bulgarian for a simple action that is repeated or habitual:

vecher sedn-eshe na chardak-a
evening sit.PFV-PST.IPFV on veranda-DEF
In the evening, he would sit down on the veranda.

Here each sitting is an unanalyzed whole, a simple event, so the perfective root of the verb sedn 'sat' is used. However, the clause as a whole describes an ongoing event conceived of as having internal structure, so the imperfective suffix -eshe is added. Without the suffix, the clause would read simply as In the evening he sat on the veranda.
