= Preterite =

Grammatical tense denoting a past event

The preterite or preterit (/ˈprɛtərɪt/ PRET-ər-it; abbreviated pret or prt) is a grammatical tense or verb form serving to denote events that took place or were completed in the past. In some languages, such as Spanish, French, and English, it is equivalent to the simple past tense. In general, it combines the perfective aspect (event viewed as a single whole; it is not to be confused with the similarly named perfect) with the past tense and may thus also be termed the perfective past. In grammars of particular languages the preterite is sometimes called the past historic, or (particularly in the Greek grammatical tradition) the aorist.

When the term preterite is used in relation to specific languages, it may not correspond precisely to this definition. In English it can be used to refer to the simple past verb form, which sometimes (but not always) expresses perfective aspect. The case of German is similar: the Präteritum is the simple (non-compound) past tense, which does not always imply perfective aspect, and is anyway often replaced by the Perfekt (compound past) even in perfective past meanings.

Preterite may be denoted by the glossing abbreviation pret or prt. The word derives from the Latin praeteritum (the perfective participle of praetereo), meaning 'passed by' or 'past'.

== Romance languages and Latin ==
=== Latin ===
In Latin, the perfect tense most commonly functions as the preterite, and refers to an action completed in the past. If the past action was not completed, one would use the imperfect. The perfect in Latin also functions in other circumstances as a present perfect.

Typical conjugation:

	dūcō, dūcere, dūxī, ductus
ego	-ī (dūxī)
tū	-istī (dūxistī)
is, ea, id	-it (dūxit)
nōs	-imus (dūximus)
vōs	-istis (dūxistis)
eī, eae, ea	-ērunt (dūxērunt)

Dūxī can be translated as (preterite) "I led", "I did lead", or (in the present perfect) "I have led."

A pronoun subject is often omitted, and usually used for emphasis.

=== French ===
In French, the preterite is known as le passé simple (the simple past). It is a past tense that indicates an action taken once in the past that was completed at some point in the past (translated: "<verb>ed"). This is as opposed to the imperfect (l'imparfait), used in expressing repeated, continual, or habitual past actions (often corresponding to English's past continuous was/were <verb>ing or habitual used to <verb>). In the spoken language, the compound tense known as le passé composé ("the compound past") began to compete with it from the 12th century onwards, and has since replaced it almost entirely. French simple past is mostly used in a narrative way to tell stories and describe successive actions. Novelists use it commonly: it brings more suspense, as the sentence can be short without any temporal reference needed. In oral language, the simple past is rarely used except while telling a story; therefore, it would be atypical to hear it in a standard discussion.

Typical conjugations:

	-er verbs (aimer)	-ir verbs (finir)	-re verbs (rendre)	-oir(e) verbs^{1} (vouloir) (croire)	Irregular (tenir)^{2}
je	-ai (aimai)	-is (finis)	-is (rendis)	-us (crus)	tins
tu	-as (aimas)	-is (finis)	-is (rendis)	-us (crus)	tins
il/elle/on	-a (aima)	-it (finit)	-it (rendit)	-ut (crut)	tint
nous	-âmes (aimâmes)	-îmes (finîmes)	-îmes (rendîmes)	-ûmes (crûmes)	tînmes
vous	-âtes (aimâtes)	-îtes (finîtes)	-îtes (rendîtes)	-ûtes (crûtes)	tîntes
ils/elles	-èrent (aimèrent)	-irent (finirent)	-irent (rendirent)	-urent (crurent)	tinrent
1. also être (je fus…) and avoir (j'eus); 2. includes tenir, venir (je vins, tu vins, ...), and all of their derivations

=== Romanian ===
Use in interwar Romania: Area of use Area of partial use Area of infrequent use Not used Historical region of Oltenia highlighted

In Romanian, the preterite is known as perfectul simplu (literally, the simple past or simple perfect). The preterite indicates a past accomplished action (translated: "verbed"); however, this tense is not frequent in the official language and not frequent in the standard speech (not used in Republic of Moldova and not used in the Romanian regions of Transylvania, Muntenia and Moldova). The general tendency is to use the compound past (perfectul compus) to express a past action that is perceived as completed at the moment of speaking.

Simple past is still actively used in current speech in the southwestern part of Romania, especially in Oltenia, but also in Banat, Crișana and Maramureș, mostly in rural areas. Usage of the preterite is very frequent in written narrative discourse, the simple past of the speech verbs being generally after a dialogue line in narration:

- Aici avem o crimă!, zise polițistul. This is a murder! said the policeman.

When used in everyday speech in standard Romanian, the preterite is used with the value of recent past, a recently completed action:

- Tocmai îl auzii pe George la radio. I have just heard George on the radio.

The second person is often used in questions about finishing an action in progress that is supposed to be over, giving the question a more informal tone:

- Gata, citirăți? Are you done, have you read [the texts]?

The forms of the simple perfect are made of an unstressed stem of the infinitive, a stressed suffix that is different in each group of verbs, and the endings -i, -și, -∅, -răm, -răți, -ră, which are the same for all the verbs:

	-a verbs (a intra)	-ea verbs (a tăcea)	-e verbs (a cere)	-e verbs (a merge)	-i verbs (a dormi)	-î verbs (a coborî)
	suffix a	suffix u	suffix u	suffix se	suffix i	suffix â/î
eu	-ai (intrai)	-ui (tăcui)	-ui (cerui)	-sei (mersei)	-ii (dormii)	-âi (coborâi)
tu	-ași (intrași)	-uși (tăcuși)	-uși (ceruși)	-seși (merseși)	-iși (dormiși)	-âși (coborâși)
el/ea	-ă (intră)	-u (tăcu)	-u (ceru)	-se (merse)	-i (dormi)	-î (coborî)
noi	-arăm (intrarăm)	-urăm (tăcurăm)	-urăm (cerurăm)	-serăm (merserăm)	-irăm (dormirăm)	-ârăm (coborârăm)
voi/dumneavoastră	-arăți (intrarăți)	-urăți (tăcurăți)	-urăți (cerurăți)	-serăți (merserăți)	-irăți (dormirăți)	-ârăți (coborârăți)
ei/ele	-ară (intrară)	-ură (tăcură)	-ură (cerură)	-seră (merseră)	-iră (dormiră)	-âră (coborâră)

=== Italian ===
In Italian, the preterite is called passato remoto (literally "remote past"). It is a past tense that indicates an action taken once and completed far in the past (mangiai, "I ate"). This is opposed to the imperfetto tense, which refers to a repeated, continuous, or habitual past action (mangiavo, "I was eating" or "I used to eat") and to the passato prossimo (literally "close past"), which refers to an action completed recently (ho mangiato, "I have eaten").

In colloquial usage, the use of the passato remoto becomes more prevalent going from the North to the South of Italy. While Northern Italians and Sardinians use passato prossimo in any perfective situation, Southern Italians will use passato remoto even for recent events.

Typical conjugations:

	-are verbs (parlare)	[Regular] -ere verbs (credere)*	[Irregular] -ere verbs (prendere)*	-ire verbs (finire)	essere
io	-ai (parlai)	-ei (credei) / -etti (credetti)	-i (presi)	-ii (finii)	fui
tu	-asti (parlasti)	-esti (credesti)	-esti (prendesti)	-isti (finisti)	fosti
lui	-ò (parlò)	-é (credé) / -ette (credette)	-e (prese)	-ì (finì)	fu
noi	-ammo (parlammo)	-emmo (credemmo)	-emmo (prendemmo)	-immo (finimmo)	fummo
voi	-aste (parlaste)	-este (credeste)	-este (prendeste)	-iste (finiste)	foste
loro	-arono (parlarono)	-erono (crederono) / -ettero (credettero)	-ero (presero)	-irono (finirono)	furono

*Many -ere verbs in Italian have stem alternations in the 1st person singular, 3rd person singular and 3rd person plural. Some verbs (with d/t in their stem, including credere) also have endings -etti (1st person singular), -ette (3rd person singular), and -ettero (3rd person plural). Additionally, unlike in most languages, the third person plural is stressed on the irregular root. (Posero is stressed on the first syllable (POH-se-ro), not the second syllable (poh-SEH-ro).)

In a few remarkable cases, all three options exist for a single verb, although usage of each of these forms may vary. For perdere for example, the first person singular can occur as persi (irregular and most correct form), perdei or perdetti (compare to the past participle which can be perso (irregular, most correct) or perduto (regular)).

=== Portuguese ===
In Portuguese, the preterite is the pretérito perfeito. The Portuguese preterite has the same form as the Spanish preterite, but the meaning is like the "composed past" of French and Italian in that, for example, corri means both "I ran" and "I have run." As in other Romance languages, it is opposed to the pretérito imperfeito (imperfect). Note that there does exist a pretérito perfeito composto (present perfect) but its meaning is not that of a perfect; instead it shows an iterative aspect. For example, tenho corrido does not mean "I have run" but rather "I've been running."

Typical conjugations:

	-ar verbs (amar)	-er verbs (correr)	-ir verbs (partir)	most irregular verbs (saber as an example)	ser/ir
eu	-ei (amei)	-i (corri)	-i (parti)	-e (soube)	fui
tu	-aste (amaste)	-este (correste)	-iste (partiste)	-este (soubeste)	foste
ele	-ou (amou)	-eu (correu)	-iu (partiu)	-e (soube)	foi
nós	-ámos, -amos (amámos, amamos)	-emos (corremos)	-imos (partimos)	-emos (soubemos)	fomos
vós	-astes (amastes)	-estes (correstes)	-istes (partistes)	-estes (soubestes)	fostes
eles	-aram (amaram)	-eram (correram)	-iram (partiram)	-eram (souberam)	foram

Some verbs change the stressed vowel in their preterite root in the third person singular to prevent confusion between it and the first person singular, like ter (eu tive versus você/ele/ela teve) and poder (eu pude versus você/ele/ela pôde). Certain other verbs also use only the root in the first and third person singulars, such as pôr (eu pus, você/ele/ela pôs).

=== Spanish ===
In Spanish, the preterite (pretérito perfecto simple, or pretérito indefinido) is a verb tense that indicates that an action taken once in the past was completed at a specific point in time in the past. (Traditional Spanish terminology calls all past tenses pretéritos, irrespective of whether they express completed or incomplete actions or events.) Usually, a definite start time or end time for the action is stated. This is opposed to the imperfect, which refers to any repeated, continuous, or habitual past action. Thus, "I ran five miles yesterday" would use the first-person preterite form of ran, corrí, whereas "I ran five miles every morning" would use the first-person imperfect form, corría. This distinction is actually one of perfective vs. imperfective aspect.

The special spellings for the "yo" form of the preterite are listed below (the accent mark goes over the 'e'); these are needed to keep their respective sounds.

- -gar verbs: -gué (jugar>jugué)
- -car verbs: -qué (buscar>busqué)
- -zar verbs: -cé (almorzar>almorcé)
- -guar verbs: -güé (aguar>agüé)

The endings for -er and -ir verbs are identical.

The third person singular and plural forms of all verbs ending in -uir and -oír, as well as some verbs ending in -aer (excluding traer), end in -yó and -yeron, respectively; these are needed to keep their respective sounds.

Examples of verbs that have anomalous stems in the preterite include most verbs ending in -ducir as well as most verbs that are irregular in the "yo" form of the present tense (including traer).

In most Iberian Mainland Spanish and, to a lesser extent, Mexican Spanish, there is still a strong distinction between the preterite and the present perfect. The preterite denotes an action that began and ended in the past, while the present perfect denotes an action that began in the past and is over; thus,

- Comí todo el día. (I ate all day long.)
- He comido todo el día (I have eaten all day.)

In most other variants of Spanish, such as in the Americas and in the Canary Islands, this distinction has tended to fade, with the preterite being used even for actions in the immediate pre-present with continuing relevance.

Typical conjugations:

	-ar verbs (hablar)	-er verbs (comer)	-ir verbs (vivir)	most irregular verbs	ser/ir
yo	-é (hablé)	-í (comí)	-í (viví)	-e (puse)	fui
tú	-aste (hablaste)	-iste (comiste)	-iste (viviste)	-iste (pusiste)	fuiste
él/ella usted	-ó (habló)	-ió (comió)	-ió (vivió)	-o (puso)	fue
nosotros	-amos (hablamos)	-imos (comimos)	-imos (vivimos)	-imos (pusimos)	fuimos
vosotros	-asteis (hablasteis)	-isteis (comisteis)	-isteis (vivisteis)	-isteis (pusisteis)	fuisteis
ellos/as ustedes	-aron (hablaron)	-ieron (comieron)	-ieron (vivieron)	-ieron (pusieron)	fueron

== Germanic languages ==
In Germanic languages, the term "preterite" is sometimes used for the past tense.

=== English ===
The majority of English's affirmative preterite forms (often called simple past or just past tense) are formed by adding -ed or -d to the verb's plain form (bare infinitive), sometimes with spelling modifications. This is the result of the conjugation system of weak verbs, already in the majority in Old English, being raised to paradigmatic status and even taking over earlier conjugations of some old strong verbs. As a result, all newly introduced verbs have the weak conjugation. Examples:

- He planted corn and oats.
- They studied grammar.
- She shoved the Viking aside. (Original preterite scēaf, from an Old English strong verb.)
- I friended him on social media. (A verb with a weak preterite.)

A number of English verbs form their preterites by suppletion, a result of either ablaut, a regular set of sound changes (to an interior vowel) in the conjugation of a strong verb, or because the verb conjugations are the remains of a more complex system of tenses in irregular verbs:

- She went to the cinema. (Preterite of "go"; uses a completely different verb – the Anglo-Saxon 'wendan' from which comes 'to wend'.)
- I ate breakfast late this morning. (Preterite of "eat.")
- He ran to the store. (Preterite of "run.")

With the exception of "to be" and auxiliary and modal verbs, interrogative and negative clauses do not use their main verbs' preterites; if their declarative or positive counterpart does not use any auxiliary or modal verb, then the auxiliary verb did (the preterite of do) is inserted and the main verb appears in its plain form, as an infinitive:

- Was she busy today?
- He was not there.
- Could she play the piano when she was ten?
- The editor had not read the book yet.
- Did he plant corn and oats?
- She did not go to the cinema.

For more details, see English verbs, Simple past, and Uses of English verb forms.

=== German ===
German has a grammatical distinction between preterite (Präteritum) and perfect (Perfekt). (Older grammar books sometimes use Imperfekt instead of Präteritum, a borrowing from Latin terminology.) Originally the distinction was as strong as in English: The Präteritum was the standard, most neutral form for past actions, and could also express an event in the remote past, contrasting with the Perfekt, which expressed an event that has consequences reaching into the present.

- Präteritum: Es regnete. "It rained. / It was raining." (I am talking about a past event.)
- Perfekt: Es hat geregnet. "It has rained." (The street is still wet.)

In modern German, however, these tenses no longer reflect any distinction in aspect ("Es hat geregnet" means both rained/was raining), which parallels this lack of distinction in the present, which has no separate verb form for the present progressive ("Es regnet": It rains, it is raining). The Präteritum now has the meaning of a narrative tense, i.e. a tense used primarily for describing connected past actions (e.g. as part of a story), and is used most often in formal writing and in literature.

Typical conjugations with the word sein (be) are:

	Ind. Präsens	Ind. Präteritum	Konj. Präsens	Konj. Präteritum
ich	bin	war	sei	wäre
du	bist	warst	seist	wärest
er/sie/es	ist	war	sei	wäre
wir	sind	waren	seien	wären
ihr	seid	wart	seiet	wäret
sie	sind	waren	seien	wären

For example, in spoken Upper German (in South Germany, Austria and Switzerland), beyond the auxiliary verbs sein (to be), werden (to become), können (to be able), wollen (to want), haben (to have), the Präteritum is rarely used in the spoken language and informal writing, though the grammatical form is fundamental to producing the subjunctive and conditional forms, while compound verb conjugations are used instead. Yiddish has gone even further and has no preterite at all. Rather, there is only one past tense, which is formed using what was originally perfect. The dialect of German spoken in North America known as Pennsylvania German has also undergone this change with the exception of the verb to be, which still retains a simple past.

The Alemannic German has also largely lost the preterite form. The only exception were the speakers of the isolated Highest Alemannic Saleytitsch dialect which disappeared around 1963/64.

Conjugations with the word siin (be) were:

	Ind. Präsens	Ind. Präteritum	Konj. Präsens	Konj. Präteritum
ich	bìn	wass	siigì	weijì
du	bìscht	wasscht	siigìscht	weijìscht
är/schi/äs	ìscht	wass	siigì	weijì
wier	sin	wassùn/wan	siigì	weijì
ier	siit	wassùt	siigìt	weijìt
schi	sìn	wassùn/wan	siigì	weijì

== Semitic languages ==
The preterite was a common Semitic form, well attested in the Akkadian language, where the preterite almost always referred to the past and was often interchangeable with the perfect. In the course of time the preterite fell into disuse in all West Semitic languages, leaving traces such as the "imperfect with waw-consecutive" in Hebrew and "imperfect with lam" in Arabic.

== See also ==
- Aorist
- Grammatical tense
- Grammatical aspect
- Wiktionary list of English irregular verbs
