= Imperfect =

Grammatical construct combining past tense with continuing aspect

The imperfect (Note: Also called the past imperfect or the preterimperfect.) (abbreviated imperf) is a verb form that combines past tense (reference to a past time) and imperfective aspect (reference to a continuing or repeated event or state). It can have meanings similar to the English "was doing (something)" or "used to do (something)". It contrasts with preterite forms, which refer to a single completed event in the past.

Traditionally, the imperfect of languages such as Latin and French is referred to as one of the tenses, although it actually encodes aspectual information in addition to tense (time reference). It may be more precisely called past imperfective.

English has no general imperfective and expresses it in different ways. The term "imperfect" in English refers to forms much more commonly called past progressive or past continuous (e.g. "was doing" or "were doing"). These are combinations of past tense with specifically continuous or progressive aspect. In German, Imperfekt formerly referred to the simply conjugated past tense (to contrast with the Perfekt or compound past form), but the term Präteritum (preterite) is now preferred, since the form does not carry any implication of imperfective aspect.

"Imperfect" comes from the Latin imperfectus "unfinished", because the imperfect expresses an ongoing, uncompleted action. The equivalent Ancient Greek term was paratatikós "prolonged".

== Indo-European languages ==
=== Germanic languages ===
==== English ====
Imperfect meanings in English are expressed in different ways depending on whether the event is continuous or habitual.

For a continuous action (one that was in progress at a particular time in the past), the past progressive (past continuous) form is used, as in "I was eating"; "They were running fast." However certain verbs that express state rather than action do not mark the progressive aspect (see Uses of English verb forms § Progressive); in these cases the simple past tense is used instead: "He was hungry"; "We knew what to do next."

Habitual (repeated) action in the past can be marked by used to, as in "I used to eat a lot", or by the auxiliary verb would, as in "Back then, I would eat early and would walk to school." (The auxiliary would also has other uses, such as expressing conditional mood.) However, in many cases the habitual nature of the action does not need to be explicitly marked on the verb, and the simple past is used: "We always ate dinner at six o'clock."

=== Italic languages ===
==== Latin ====
Conjugation of the imperfect indicative:

	parāre	docēre	legere	capere	scīre	esse
ego	parābam	docēbam	legēbam	capiēbam	sciēbam	eram
tū	parābās	docēbās	legēbās	capiēbās	sciēbās	erās
is	parābat	docēbat	legēbat	capiēbat	sciēbat	erat
nōs	parābāmus	docēbāmus	legēbāmus	capiēbāmus	sciēbāmus	erāmus
vōs	parābātis	docēbātis	legēbātis	capiēbātis	sciēbātis	erātis
eī	parābant	docēbant	legēbant	capiēbant	sciēbant	erant

Notes:

- The imperfect is signified by the signs ba and ebā.
- The imperfect forms of esse are used as auxiliary verbs in the pluperfect of the passive voice along with perfect passive participles.

=== Romance languages ===
In Romance languages, the imperfect is generally a past tense. Its uses include representing:

- Repetition and continuity: an action that was happening, used to happen, or happened regularly in the past, as it was ongoing
- A description of people, things, or conditions of the past
- A time in the past
- A relation between past happenings: a situation that was in progress in the past or a condition originated in a previous time, when another isolated and important event occurred (the first verb, indicating the status in progress or condition from the past using the imperfect, while the latter uses the preterite).
- A physical or mental state or condition in progress in the past. Often used with verbs of being, emotion, capability, or conscience.

A common mistake of beginners learning a Romance language is putting too much emphasis on whether the time the action occurred is known. This generally does not affect how the imperfect is used. For example, the sentence "Someone ate all of my cookies." (when translated) is not a good candidate for the imperfect. Fundamentally, it is no different from the sentence "We ate all the cookies." Note this fails the repeatability requirement of the imperfect, as it is only known to have happened once. On the other hand, the sentence "I used to have fun in the 1960s." is a good candidate for the imperfect, even though its period is known. In short, knowing when an action occurred is not nearly as important as how long it occurred (or was and still is occurring).

==== French ====
To form the imperfect for French regular verbs, take the first person plural present tense, the "nous" (we) form, subtract the -ons suffix, and add the appropriate ending (the forms for être (to be), whose "nous" form does not end in -ons, are irregular; they start with ét- but have the same endings). Verbs that terminate in a stem of -cer and -ger undergo minor orthographic changes to preserve the phonetic sound or allophone. Verbs whose root terminates in the letter "i" maintain the letter despite the consecutiveness in the "nous" and "vous" forms.

It is used to express the ideas of habitual actions or states of being; physical and emotional descriptions: time, weather, age, feelings; actions or states of an unspecified duration; background information in conjunction with the passé composé; wishes or suggestions; conditions in "si" clauses; the expressions "être en train de" and "venir de" in the past.

		parler	choisir	vendre	être	commencer	manger	étudier
je	-ais	parlais	choisissais	vendais	étais	commençais	mangeais	étudiais
tu	-ais	parlais	choisissais	vendais	étais	commençais	mangeais	étudiais
il	-ait	parlait	choisissait	vendait	était	commençait	mangeait	étudiait
nous	-ions	parlions	choisissions	vendions	étions	commencions	mangions	étudiions
vous	-iez	parliez	choisissiez	vendiez	étiez	commenciez	mangiez	étudiiez
ils	-aient	parlaient	choisissaient	vendaient	étaient	commençaient	mangeaient	étudiaient

==== Italian ====
Conjugation of the imperfect indicative:

	avere	essere	parlare	credere	finire	dire	opporre
io	avevo	ero	parlavo	credevo	finivo	dicevo	opponevo
tu	avevi	eri	parlavi	credevi	finivi	dicevi	opponevi
lui	aveva	era	parlava	credeva	finiva	diceva	opponeva
noi	avevamo	eravamo	parlavamo	credevamo	finivamo	dicevamo	opponevamo
voi	avevate	eravate	parlavate	credevate	finivate	dicevate	opponevate
loro	avevano	erano	parlavano	credevano	finivano	dicevano	opponevano

Notes:

- Dropping the -re suffix and adding -vo, -vi, -va, -vamo, -vate, and -vano form verbs.
- Although dire and opporre (as all the composite forms of verb porre and dire) may seem irregular, they are a part of a verb family that has stronger roots to Latin equivalents (lat. pōnere/pōnēbam and dīcere/dīcēbam). Other verbs include fare(infinitive)/faccio(present tense)/facevo(imperfect) (lat.facere/facio/faciēbam), bere/bevo/bevevo (bibere/bibo/bibēbam), trarre/traggo/traevo (trahere/traho/trahēbam), durre/duco/ducevo[obs.] (dūcere/dūco/dūcēbam) and all their composite forms..
- There is another imperfect in Italian formed by combining the imperfect of the verb stare (stavo, stavi, stava, stavamo, stavate, stavano) with the gerund. For example, "parlavo" could be said as "stavo parlando". The difference is similar to the difference between "I eat" and "I am eating" in English. However, English does not make this distinction in the imperfect.

==== Romanian ====
Conjugation of the imperfect indicative:

	cânta(re)	crede(re)	plăcea (plăcere)	dormi(re)	fi(re)
eu	cântam	credeam	plăceam	dormeam	eram
tu	cântai	credeai	plăceai	dormeai	erai
el/ea	cânta	credea	plăcea	dormea	era
noi	cântam	credeam	plăceam	dormeam	eram
voi	cântați	credeați	plăceați	dormeați	erați
ei	cântau	credeau	plăceau	dormeau	erau

Notes:

- The imperfect is formed from the short infinitive form of the verbs (without the -re suffix) combined with the -am, -ai, -a, -am, -ați, and -au endings.
- Short infinitives ending in „-a” (1st conjugation) do not double this letter: e.g. "pleca” in the first person singular is "plecam" and not "plecaam".
- Short infinitives ending in "-i" take the pattern of those ending in "-e" (e.g. dormi becomes dormeam in 1st person imperfect), while short infinitives ending in "-î" take the pattern of those ending in "-a" (e.g. hotărî becomes hotăram in 1st person imperfect).
- There is only one irregular verb in the imperfect: a fi, that is created from the radical era-, instead of fi-.

==== Spanish ====
In Spanish, the imperfect can be called the imperfecto or the copretérito. Conjugation of the imperfect indicative:

	hablar	comer	insistir	ir	ser	ver
yo	hablaba	comía	insistía	iba	era	veía
tú	hablabas	comías	insistías	ibas	eras	veías
él	hablaba	comía	insistía	iba	era	veía
nosotros	hablábamos	comíamos	insistíamos	íbamos	éramos	veíamos
vosotros	hablabais	comíais	insistíais	ibais	erais	veíais
ellos	hablaban	comían	insistían	iban	eran	veían

- There are only three irregular verbs in the imperfect: ir, ser, and ver.
  - Historically, ir — unlike other Spanish "-ir verbs" — failed to drop the -b- of the Latin imperfect.
  - The imperfect of ser is likewise a continuation of the Latin imperfect (of esse), with the same stem appearing in tú eres (thanks to pre-classical Latin rhotacism).
  - The imperfect of ver (veía etc.) was historically considered regular in Old Spanish, where the infinitive veer provided the stem ve-, but that is no longer the case in standard Spanish.
- In formal Spanish:
  - Pronouns "tú" and "vosotros" are replaced by "usted" and "ustedes", with the verb conjugated in third person.
  - American Spanish always replaces "vosotros" with "ustedes", switching the verb accordingly. The countries that show the kind of voseo in which "tú" is replaced by "vos" use the same forms as for "tú" in this tense.
- Because first and third-person singular forms are the same for all verbs, such phrases can be more ambiguous (insufficient deixis); this can be improved by adding a claifying pronoun or subject noun as a reference point.

==== Portuguese ====
In Portuguese, the imperfect indicative, called "pretérito imperfeito", is quite similar to Spanish:

	cantar	bater	partir	pôr	ser	ter	vir
eu	cantava	batia	partia	punha	era	tinha	vinha
tu	cantavas	batias	partias	punhas	eras	tinhas	vinhas
ele/ela/você	cantava	batia	partia	punha	era	tinha	vinha
nós	cantávamos	batíamos	partíamos	púnhamos	éramos	tínhamos	vínhamos
vós	cantáveis	batíeis	partíeis	púnheis	éreis	tínheis	vínheis
eles/elas/vocês	cantavam	batiam	partiam	punham	eram	tinham	vinham

There are four irregular verbs: "pôr" (to put), "ser" (to be), "ter" (to have) and "vir" (to come). Unlike in Spanish, the verbs "ver" (to see) and "ir" (to go) are regular in the Portuguese imperfect.

Like in Italian, it is also commonly formed by combining the imperfect of the verb estar (estava, estavas, estava, estávamos, estáveis, estavam) with the gerund (for example, "falando", the gerund form of "falar", to speak, to talk). In Brazilian Portuguese, both in informal oral speech and informal written language (for example, online or phone texting), it is more common to use the composite "estava falando" (commonly reduced to "tava falando"), than to use the synthetic "falava", which is more common in formal written forms.

The synthetic pluperfect ("eu falara" "I had spoken") is considered old-fashioned and never used in spoken communication – it is substituted by the composite "eu tinha falado", which is formed with the imperfect form of the verb "ter" (to have) (tinha tinhas tinha tínhamos tínheis tinham) plus the past participle ("falado"). Alternatively, the verb "ter" can be swapped with the imperfect form of the verb "haver" (to have) (havia havias havia haviamos havíeis haviam)

==== Galician ====
Similar to the closely related Portuguese, as well as to Spanish, but often called "copretérito" (from co-, same particle found in English "collaboration" and "coexistence", plus "pretérito", which is "past tense", in reference of it being a second past tense that exists along the regular one). Same as with them, in formal usage "ti" and "vós/vosoutros" change to "vostede" and "vostedes" and are followed by the third person. In verbs ended in -aer, -oer, -aír and -oír, the first and second person of the plural show the presence of a diaeresis.

	cantar	bater	partir	pór	moer
eu	cantaba	batía	partía	puña	moía
ti	cantabas	batias	partías	puñas	moías
el/ela/vostede	cantaba	batía	partía	puña	moía
nós/nosoutros	cantábamos	batíamos	partíamos	puñamos	moïamos
vós/vosoutros	cantábades	batíades	partíades	puñades	moïades
eles/elas/vostedes	cantaban	batían	partían	puñan	moía

=== Indo-Aryan languages ===
==== Hindi ====
Hindi, an Indo-Aryan language, has indicative imperfect tense conjugation only for the verb होना (honā) [to be] and the rest of the verbs lack this conjugation. The indicative imperfect forms of होना (honā) comes from Sanskrit स्थित (stʰita) "standing, situated" which are derived from the PIE root *steh₂- (“to stand”). The imperfect conjugation is derived from a participle form and hence its conjugations agree only with the number and gender of the grammatical person and not the pronoun itself. So, the grammatically singular pronouns (e.g., मैं ma͠i "I" and तू tū "you" etc.) are assigned the singular imperfect forms (i.e. था thā or थी thī) depending on the gender of the person or the noun they refer to, and the grammatically plural pronouns (e.g. हम ham "we" etc.) are assigned the plural imperfect forms (थे thē and थीं thīm̊). An exception to this is the pronoun तुम (tum) which takes in the plural imperfect form (थे thē) in masculine gender but singular form (थी thī) in feminine gender.

These imperfect conjugations also act as copula to form the imperfect past forms for the three grammatical aspects that Hindi hasː Habitual, Perfective, and Progressive aspects.

Imperfect Past Copula
Gender	Singular	Plural
♂	thā	thē
♀	thī	thīm̊

Imperfect Past Conjugations
Aspect		Singular			Plural				Translation (3rd person only)
Aspect		1P	2P	3P	2P		1P	3P	Translation (3rd person only)
Aspect		ma͠i	tū	ye/vo	tum	āp	ham	ye/vo	Translation (3rd person only)
Simple	♂	thā			thē				he was
Simple	♀	thī				thīm̊			she was
Habitual	♂	boltā thā			boltē thē				he used to speak
Habitual	♀	boltī thī				boltī thīm̊			she used to speak
Progressive	♂	bol rahā thā			bol rahē thē				he was speaking
Progressive	♀	bol rahī thī				bol rahī thīm̊			she was speaking

Noteː The 2P pronouns 'āp' & 'tum' although grammatically plural but are used as singular pronouns, akin to English pronoun 'you'.

==== Assamese ====
In Assamese, two imperfect forms are recognisedː present progressive and/or present perfect & past progressive and/or remote past. There is only one periphrastic tense which functions as both the present progressive and present perfect with reference to the setting in which is placed.

		1P	2P			3P
		1P	intimate	familiar	formal	3P
Imperfective	Present	বুলিছোঁ bulisü͂	বুলিছ buliso	বুলিছা bulisa	বুলিছে bulise	
Imperfective	Past	বুলিছিলোঁ bulisilü͂	বুলিছিলি bulisili	বুলিছিলা bulisila	বুলিছিলে bulisile	
Continuous	Present	বুলি আছোঁ buli asü͂	বুলি আছ buli aso	বুলি আছা buli asa	বুলি আছে buli ase	
Continuous	Past	বুলি আছিলোঁ buli asilü͂	বুলি আছিলি buli asili	বুলি আছিলা buli asila	বুলি আছিলে buli asile	
Continuous	Future	বুলি থাকিম buli thakim	বুলি থাকিবি buli thakibi	বুলি থাকিবা buli thakiba	বুলি থাকিব buli thakibo	

=== Indo-Iranian languages ===
==== Persian ====
Like all other past tenses, imperfect is conjugated regularly for all verbs. Formation: [preverb] + mi- + past stem + past ending. Conjugation of the imperfect indicative for the first person singular is shown in the table belowː

	raftan (to go)	kâr kardan (to work)
1st sg.	miraftam	kâr mikardam
2nd sg.	mirafti	kâr mikardi
3rd sg.	miraft	kâr mikard
1st pl.	miraftim	kâr mikardim
2nd pl.	miraftid	kâr mikardid
3rd pl.	miraftand	kâr mikardand

=== Slavic languages ===
Most Slavic languages have lost the imperfect but it is preserved in Bulgarian and Macedonian. It is also officially retained in Serbian and Croatian but is considered old-fashioned and restricted to literature for poetic and stylistic reasons.

== Turkish ==
Turkish has separate tenses for past continuous and imperfect. To form the past continuous tense for Turkish verbs, after removing the infinitive suffix (-mek or -mak), take the present continuous tense suffix "-yor" without personal suffixes, and add the ending for the simple past plus the appropriate personal suffix

- As -du (which has a rounded back vowel) succeeds -lar (which has an unrounded back vowel), instead of -yor (which has a rounded back vowel) when the subject is the third person plural onlar, it becomes -dı (which has an unrounded back vowel).
- If a verb ends in t, it may change into d (especially gitmek and etmek).
- If a verb ends in open vowels (a or e), the open vowels become closed while adding -yor (because of the closed auxiliary vowel -i-).
  a becomes ı if the preceding vowel is unrounded, u if it is rounded (ağla -> ağlıyor, topla -> topluyor)
  e becomes i if the preceding vowel is unrounded, ü if it is rounded (bekle -> bekliyor, söyle -> söylüyor)
- If the verb ends in a consonant, the auxiliary vowel -i- must be added before -yor. It becomes -ı-, -u- or -ü- depending on the frontness and roundedness of the preceding vowel, because of the vowel harmony:
  -i if the preceding vowel is e or i (front unrounded): gel -> geliyor
  -ı if the preceding vowel is a or ı (back unrounded): bak -> bakıyor
  -u if the preceding vowel is o or u (back rounded): kork -> korkuyor
  -ü if the preceding vowel is ö or ü (front rounded): gör -> görüyor
- r of -yor may be dropped in colloquial speech.

To form the negative of the past continuous tense, the negation suffix "-ma/-me", which becomes -mi, -mı, -mu, or -mü because of the closed auxiliary vowel and the vowel harmony, must be added before -yor.

Examples:

	gelmek	gitmek	ağlamak	beklemek	toplamak	söylemek	satmak
ben	gelmiyordum	gitmiyordum	ağlamıyordum	beklemiyordum	toplamıyordum	söylemiyordum	satmıyordum
sen	gelmiyordun	gitmiyordun	ağlamıyordun	beklemiyordun	toplamıyordun	söylemiyordun	satmıyordun
o	gelmiyordu	gitmiyordu	ağlamıyordu	beklemiyordu	toplamıyordu	söylemiyordu	satmıyordu
biz	gelmiyorduk	gitmiyorduk	ağlamıyorduk	beklemiyorduk	toplamıyorduk	söylemiyorduk	satmıyorduk
siz	gelmiyordunuz	gitmiyordunuz	ağlamıyordunuz	beklemiyordunuz	toplamıyordunuz	söylemiyordunuz	satmıyordunuz
onlar	gelmiyorlardı	gitmiyorlardı	ağlamıyorlardı	beklemiyorlardı	toplamıyorlardı	söylemiyorlardı	satmıyorlardı

- The epenthetic consonant y is inserted between -mu and -du.
- As -mu and -du (which have a rounded back vowel) succeeds -lar (which has an unrounded back vowel) instead of -yor (which has a rounded back vowel) when the subject is the third person plural, onlar, they become -mı and -dı (which have an unrounded back vowel).

== Semitic languages ==
Semitic languages, especially the ancient forms, do not make use of the imperfect (or perfect) tense with verbs. Instead, they use the imperfective and perfective aspects, respectively. Aspects are similar to tenses, but differ by requiring contextual comprehension to know whether the verb indicates a completed or non-completed action.

== Dravidian languages ==
=== Malayalam ===
In Malayalam (verbs are never conjugated for grammatical person, which is indicated by a pronoun), there are two indicative imperfects, corresponding exactly with English:

1 -ഉകയായിരുന്നു (ukayāyirunnu) endings (... was...), for example:

ഓടുകയായിരുന്നു (ōṭukayāyirunnu) ... was running

2 -ഉമായിരുന്നു (umāyirunnu) endings (... used to ...), for example:

ഓടുമായിരുന്നു (ōṭumāyirunnu) ... used to run

- To form the "was doing" imperfect, take the infinitive ending in ഉക (uka), for example ഓടുക (ōṭuka) – to run – and add the ending – യായിരുന്നു (yāyirunnu).

- To form the "used to do" imperfect, take off the ക (ka) from the end of the "uka" form and add മായിരുന്നു (māyirunnu) in its stead.

To make a verb in the imperfect negative, add അല്ല് (all) after the ഉകയ (ukaya) part of the ending for the "was doing" imperfect. For example, ഓടുകയല്ലായിരുന്നു (ōṭukayallāyirunnu) (...was not running). To do the same for the "used to do" imperfect, take off the ഉമ (uma) from the ending and add അത്തില്ല (attilla) instead. For example, ഓടത്തില്ലായിരുന്നു (ōṭattillāyirunnu) (...didn't use to run)

== Sources ==
- Mason, Charles Peter (1873). English Grammar.
