= Habitual be =

Use of an uninflected be in certain varieties of English

Habitual be, also called invariant be, is the use of an uninflected be (such as "she be singing") instead of Standard English inflection (such as "she sings") to convey habitual or extended actions like a habit of singing, commonly displayed in African-American English (AAE), Caribbean English and Hiberno-English. In AAE, this use of be indicates that a subject repeatedly does an action or embodies a trait, whereas in General American English an inflection of the verb to be (such as "she was singing") means only that an individual has done an action in a particular tense, and "she sings" is used for the habitual form.

Despite common misconceptions, AAE does not simply replace is with be across all contexts and tenses, nor does this swap provide no additional meaning to a phrase. This be usage in AAE marks a habitual grammatical aspect which Standard English does not explicitly distinguish: to say a kitten be napping is different than to say a kitten is napping, and suggests the kitten naps habitually.

== Hypothesized sources ==
The source of habitual be in AAE is still disputed. Some linguists suggest it came from the finite be in the 17th- to 19th-century English of British settlers (perhaps especially those from South West England, but the usage may be the recent "Mummerset" in this context). Other linguists believe that it came from Scots-Irish immigrants, whose Ulster Scots dialects mark habitual verb forms with be and do be.

One hypothesis is that habitual be simply diffused into New World Black English from Hiberno-English (HE) through contact in the Caribbean. Evidence includes the fact that both dialects structure sentences with the habitual be almost identically:

(1) Even when I do be round there with friends, I do be scared. (HE)

(2) Christmas Day, well, everybody be so choked up over gifts and everything, they don't be too hungry. (AAE)

Criticism of that hypothesis stems from the fact that there is no evidence that be has been used as a habitual marker either in the past or today in Caribbean creoles of English. Instead, Caribbean English uses the preverbal does to mark habitualness. They use be only as filler between does and the sentence's predicate.

The hypothesis states that the geographical differences in use of be and do (be), in Northern and Southern HE respectively, accounts for the difference in use of be and does (be) in AAE and Caribbean English respectively. In the 17th and 18th centuries, Northern HE speakers immigrated more to North America, and Southern HE speakers immigrated to the Caribbean Islands, both working alongside black people. Although the expansion to include the differences in the dialects of HE accounts for the absence of habitual be in Caribbean English creoles, the hypothesis has its disadvantages as well. The first problem is the distribution of do and be again. In Southern HE, do is more common with be than other verbs, but in Caribbean English, does is less common with be than other verbs. Hibernian English marks habitualness with be, and Caribbean English rarely marks it, if at all. A second problem is that there is not sufficient evidence to show that Southern HE speakers did not introduce do (be) to the American colonies since there were Southern HE speakers in the colonies who worked closely with Black people.

A further expansion and modification of the diffusion hypotheses account for the periphrastic do found in Caribbean English creoles. The feature was common in British English and persisted in the nonstandard Southern and Southwestern English dialects that were used by the White colonials in the Caribbean colonies. Irish and Black people both learned English at the same time, and both groups learned a new language and retained the conventions of their native languages. In America, the Irish feature habitual be may have diffused into AAE and the two assemblages of people were in close contact and communicating with a new tongue. It is possible that British dialects could have had features that served as models for habitual do (be) in the Caribbean creoles, which, in turn, expanded to AAE in the Americas. Also, Southern and Southwestern British immigrants traveled to the American colonies as well and their dialects would have been used as a model to Black people, leading to a drawback, the introduction, and subsequent loss of habitual do (be) in America, which was also the problem with the first expansion of the diffusion hypothesis. Another hypothesis for the origins of habitual be in HE and then into AAE is the most logical and the strongest of the lot.

The decreolization theory for the emergence of habitual be in AAE is the most likely and most supported of the theories of its origin. It involves the decreolization process of Caribbean English creole, with the loss of does (be), which itself is a decreolization of a previous creole habitual marker and its co-occurrence with be. The process is seen as one code-shifting in the series of English learned by black people in the New World. The existence of a category of habituals in the native Caribbean languages at the basilectal level shows that over time, Black people learned English but kept the conventions of their native languages until code-shifting replaced the old conventions with new ones. Rickford gives evidence:

(18) Habitual aspect with a prepositional phrase or locative:

Stage 1: He (d)a de [dc] in the bed. (basilect)

Stage 2: He does de in the bed. (hab. (d)a -> does)

Stage 3: He does be in the bed. (loc. cop. de -> be)

Stage 4: He 0 be in the bed. (does -> 0; be 'habitual')

That set is just one of three; preceding a predicate containing a prepositional phrase, it shows the shifting from the basilectal, native language convention, level to the English habitual be level in stage 4, with the co-existence of two or more stages at once. It is hypothesized that the first three stages were present in the speech of plantation slaves, and the hypothesis appears to be supported by the presence of these stages today on the Sea Islands of the United States, with only stage four surviving anywhere else in America. The advantages of this hypothesis are that there is no assumption that black people had no native language influence and that the conventions of English were perfectly copied to their emerging English grammars and the fact that the decreolizing of habitual be also follows the pattern of decreolization in general linguistics and the pattern in cultural anthropology, with formal approximations of English over time and cultural assimilation of language respectively.

Another merit is that this same pattern of decreolizing of be is found in other creoles that are relatively close to AAE and affirm the plausibility of this origin for habitual be. Yet another merit for the hypothesis is that it can both incorporate the strong points of the revised diffusion hypotheses and surmount the weaknesses associated with them. For instance, creoles and dialects have lexicons that derive from the languages that feed them, and AAE and Caribbean English are no different by following the models of language dialects that came in contact with them and used their native language conventions as well as the newly learned conventions to mutate into varieties of the model language.

A possible disadvantage of the hypothesis is that it does not work for areas in which creoles did not develop, such as areas of America with very few black people in the population. Another possible disadvantage is that the sources of slaves for the differing regions of America and the Caribbean could have led to different creole starting points, leading to the different habitual markers in AAE and Caribbean English creoles. Both minor problems are far outweighed by the advantages of the hypothesis, and they affirm that it is the best possible origin of habitual be.

=== Research ===
In a 2005 study, 5 and 6-year-old children were shown drawings of Sesame Street characters acting outside their usual behaviors, including a scene where Cookie Monster, who generally eats cookies, is shown eating nothing as Elmo eats cookies nearby. When the children were asked, "Who is eating cookies?", both the African American English speakers and the Standard English speakers correctly answered that Elmo is eating cookies, but when asked "Who be eating cookies?" most of the Standard English speakers answered Elmo again while most of the African American English speakers reported that Cookie Monster be eating cookies. Due to the habitual meaning of be in AAE, they chose the character with a well-known cookie habit, not the one eating cookies currently.

== See also ==
- English markers of habitual aspect
- Present progressive
