= Present perfect =

Grammatical combination of the present tense and the perfect aspect

The present perfect is a grammatical combination of the present tense and perfect aspect that is used to express a past event that has present consequences. The term is used particularly in the context of English grammar to refer to forms like "I have finished". The forms are present because they use the present tense of the auxiliary verb have, and perfect because they use that auxiliary in combination with the past participle of the main verb. (Other perfect constructions also exist, such as the past perfect: "I had eaten.")

Analogous forms are found in some other languages, and they may also be described as present perfect; they often have other names such as the German Perfekt, the French passé composé and the Italian passato prossimo. They may also have different ranges of usage: in all three of the languages just mentioned, the forms in question serve as a general past tense, at least for completed actions.

In English, completed actions in many contexts are referred to using the simple past verb form rather than the present perfect. English also has a present perfect continuous (or present perfect progressive) form, which combines present tense with both perfect aspect and continuous (progressive) aspect: "I have been eating". The action is not necessarily complete; and the same is true of certain uses of the basic present perfect when the verb expresses a state or a habitual action: "I have lived here for five years."

== Auxiliaries ==
In modern English, the auxiliary verb used to form the present perfect is always to have. A typical present perfect clause thus consists of the subject, the auxiliary have/has, and the past participle (third form) of main verb. Examples:

- I have done so much in my life.
- You have gone to school.
- He has already arrived in America.
- He has had child after child... (The Mask of Anarchy, Percy Shelley)
- Lovely tales that we have heard or read... (Endymion, John Keats)

Early Modern English used both to have and to be as perfect auxiliaries. The usage differs in that to have expressed emphasis in the process of the action that was completed, whereas to be put the emphasis in the final state after the action is completed. Examples of the second can be found in older texts:

- Madam, the Lady Valeria is come to visit you. (The Tragedy of Coriolanus, Shakespeare)
- Vext the dim sea: I am become a name... (Ulysses, Tennyson)
- I am become Time, destroyer of worlds. (Bhagavad Gita)
- Pillars are fallen at thy feet... (Marius amid the Ruins of Carthage, Lydia Maria Child)
- I am come in sorrow. (Lord Jim, Conrad)
- I am come in my Father's name, and ye receive me not (John 5:43, The Bible)

In many other European languages, the equivalent of to have (e.g. German haben, French avoir, Italian avere) is used to form the present perfect (or their equivalent of the present perfect) for most or all verbs. However, the equivalent of to be (e.g. German sein, French être, Italian essere) serves as the auxiliary for other verbs in some languages, such as German, Dutch, Danish (but not Swedish or Norwegian), French, and Italian (but not Spanish or Portuguese). Generally, the verbs that take to be as an auxiliary are intransitive verbs denoting motion or change of state (e.g. to arrive, to go, to fall).

For more details, see Perfect construction with auxiliaries.

== English ==
The present perfect in English is used chiefly for completed past actions or events when it is understood that it is the present result of the events that is focused upon, rather than the moment of completion. No particular past time frame is specified for the action/event. When a past time frame (a point of time in the past, or period of time which ended in the past) is specified for the event, explicitly or implicitly, the simple past is used rather than the present perfect.

The tense may be said to be a sort of mixture of present and past. It always implies a strong connection with the present and is used chiefly in conversations, letters, newspapers and TV and radio reports.

It can also be used for ongoing or habitual situations continuing up to the present time (generally not completed, but the present time may be the moment of completion). That usage describes for how long or since when something has been the case, normally based on time expressions with for or since (such as for two years, since 1995). Then, the present perfect continuous form is often used, if a continuing action is being described.

For examples, see Uses of English verb forms § Present perfect as well as the sections of that article relating to the simple past, present perfect continuous, and other perfect forms.

== German ==
Modern German has lost its perfect aspect in the present tense. The present perfect form implies the perfective aspect and colloquially usually replaces the simple past (except in the verb sein 'to be'), but the simple past still is frequently used in non-colloquial and/or narrative registers.

The present perfect form is often called in German the "conversational past" while the simple past is often called the "narrative past".

In Standard German, the sein-vs-haben distinction includes the intransitive-+-motion idea for sein ('to be') usage but is independent of the reflexive-voice difference when forming the Perfekt.

- Ich habe gegessen ('I have eaten')
- Du bist gekommen ('You have come', literally 'you are come.')
- Sie sind gefallen ('They have fallen', literally 'they are fallen.')
- Sie ist geschwommen ('She has swum', literally, 'she is swum.')
- Du hast dich beeilt ('You have hurried', literally 'You have yourself hurried')

== French ==
French has no present perfect aspect. However, it has a grammatical form that is constructed in the same way as is the present perfect in English, Spanish, and Portuguese by using a conjugated form of (usually) avoir 'to have' plus a past participle. The term passé composé (literally 'compound past') is the standard name for this form, which has perfective aspect rather than perfect aspect. The French simple past form, which also conveys perfective aspect, is analogous to the German simple past in that it has been largely displaced by the compound past and relegated to narrative usage.

In standard French, a verb that is used reflexively takes être ('to be') rather than avoir ('to have') as auxiliary in compound past tenses (passé composé, plus-que-parfait, passé antérieur, futur antérieur). In addition, a small set of about 20 non-reflexive verbs also use être as auxiliary (some students memorize these using the acrostic mnemonic DR & MRS VAN DER TRAMP).

- J'ai mangé ('I have eaten')
- Tu es venu(e) ('You have come', literally 'you are come.')
- Nous sommes arrivé(e)s ('We have arrived', literally 'we are arrived.')
- Vous vous êtes levé(e)(s) ('You have got up', reflexive verb, literally 'you have raised yourself/selves')

Note that in many cases, the English Present Perfect is best translated by the Présent in French:

- Ça fait une heure que j'attends ('I've been waiting for an hour')
- Les prix augmentent ('Prices have risen')

== Spanish ==
The Spanish present perfect form conveys a true perfect aspect. Standard Spanish is like modern English in that haber is always the auxiliary regardless of the reflexive voice and regardless of the verb in question:

Yo he comido ('I have eaten')

Ellos han ido ('They have gone')

Él ha jugado ('He has played')

Spanish differs from French, German, and English in that its have word, haber, serves only as auxiliary in the modern language; it does not denote possession ('I have a car'), which is handled by the verb tener ('Tengo un coche').

In some forms of Spanish, such as the Rio Platense Spanish spoken in Argentina and Uruguay, the present perfect is rarely used: the simple past replaces it. In Castilian Spanish, however, the present perfect is normal when talking about events that occur "today".

For example, to refer to "this morning", in Spain one would say, [Yo] me he levantado tarde y [eso] no me ha dado tiempo de desayunar ('I have woken up late and it has given me not time to-eat-breakfast'), instead of [Yo] me levanté tarde y [eso] no me dio tiempo de desayunar ('I woke up late and it gave me not time to-eat-breakfast'). With no context, listeners from Spain would assume that the latter occurred yesterday or a long time ago. For the same reason, speakers of Castilian Spanish use the present perfect to talk about the immediate past (events having occurred only a few moments ago), such as ¿Qué has dicho? No te he oído rather than ¿Qué dijiste? No te oí. ('What did you say? I couldn't hear you.')

== Portuguese ==
The Portuguese present perfect form conveys a true perfect aspect. Modern Portuguese differs from Spanish in that the auxiliary used is normally ter (Spanish tener) rather than haver (Spanish haber). Furthermore, the meaning of the present perfect is different from that in Spanish in that it implies an iterative aspect. Eu tenho comido translates to 'I have been eating' rather than 'I have eaten'. (However, other tenses are still as in Spanish: eu tinha comido means 'I had eaten' in modern Portuguese, like Spanish yo había comido.)

The perfect aspect may be indicated lexically by using the simple past form of the verb, preceded by já ('already'): Eu já comi (lit.: 'I already ate') connotes 'I have already eaten'.

E.g.: Ele já foi, como sabem, duas vezes candidato ao Prémio Sakharov, que é atribuído anualmente por este Parlamento.

'He has, as you know, already been nominated twice for the Sakharov Prize, which this Parliament awards each year.'

== Amharic ==
In Amharic, the Present Perfect is formed by combining the Gerund with the Continuous suffix “-all-” (eg. “ደርሶ derso”, having arrived –> “ደርሶናል dersonal”, we have arrived). Just like in English, its meaning differs from the Perfective in that the focus is on the result of the action. The Present Perfect is also used to indicate a present state with stative verbs, since using the Imperfective might imply a future situation (“ራቦኛል raboňal”, I am hungry rather than “ይርበኛል yırbeňal”).

== Etymology ==
The word perfect in the tense name comes from a Latin root referring to completion, rather than to perfection in the sense of "having no flaws". (In fact this "flawless" sense of perfect evolved by extension from the former sense, because something being created is finished when it no longer has any flaws.) Perfect tenses are named thus because they refer to actions that are finished with respect to the present (or some other time under consideration); for example, "I have eaten all the bread" refers to an action which is, as of now, completed. However, as seen above, not all uses of present perfect constructions involve an idea of completion.

In the grammar of languages such as Latin and Ancient Greek, the form most closely corresponding to the English present perfect is known simply as the perfect. For more information see the article Perfect (grammar).

- Grammatical tense
- Grammatical aspect
- Perfect (grammar)
- Pluperfect
- Passé composé
- Perfective aspect
