= Semelfactive =

Type of lexical aspect

In linguistics, semelfactives are a type of Aktionsart or lexical aspect, which is a property of verbs and other predicates representing the temporal flow of an event. A semelfactive describes a very brief event which ends by returning to its initial state, making it capable of being repeated. Semelfactive verbs in English include "blink", "sneeze", and "knock".

As a kind of Aktionsart, in English the temporal information of semelfactives is incorporated into the verb's root itself, rather than through auxiliary verbs or morphological inflections as in other types of aspect. The use of the term "semelfactive" is analogous to iterative aspect in the realm of grammatical aspect.

A semelfactive event is punctual or non-durative, since it happens suddenly and lasts only a moment. According to Bernard Comrie, who first posited the idea of semelfactive as a category of aktionsart, the event represented by a semelfactive verb is also perfective (treated as a complete action with no explicit internal temporal structure) and atelic (not having a goal). However, Kearns notes there is no consensus on whether semelfactives should be considered telic or atelic. Kearns considers semelfactives to be bounded but atelic, where telicity is understood as a kind of boundedness.
