= Cessative aspect =

Grammatical aspect referring to the end of a state

The cessative aspect or terminative aspect is a grammatical aspect referring to the end of an action or a state. It is the opposite of the inchoative aspect and conveys the idea "to finish doing something".

In Yaqui, the cessative is formed with the suffix -yaáte. For example:

ču'ú 'íntok čái-yaáte-k 'á'a nók-híkkaha-ki-i
dog and yell-stop-PFV him talk-hear-PPL-STAT
"the dog stopped barking when he heard him talking"

In Timbisha, the cessative is formed with the suffix -mmahwan. For example:

satü püe nangkawimmahwa
that just talk-CESSATIVE
"he just finished talking"
