= Habitual aspect =

Grammatical aspect signifying habit

In linguistics, the aspect of a verb is a grammatical category that defines the temporal flow (or lack thereof) in a given action, event, or state. As its name suggests, the habitual aspect (abbreviated HAB), not to be confused with iterative aspect or frequentative aspect, specifies an action as occurring habitually: the subject performs the action usually, ordinarily, or customarily. As such, the habitual aspect provides structural information on the nature of the subject referent, "John smokes" being interpretable as "John is a smoker", "Enjoh habitually gets up early in the morning" as "Enjoh is an early bird". The habitual aspect is a type of imperfective aspect, which does not depict an event as a single entity viewed only as a whole but instead specifies something about its internal temporal structure.

Östen Dahl found that the habitual past, the most common tense context for the habitual, occurred in only seven of 60 languages sampled, including English. Especially in Turkic languages such as Azerbaijani and Turkish, he found that the habitual can occur in combination with the predictive mood.

== Hindustani ==
Modern Hindustani (Hindi and Urdu) has a specific participle form to mark the habitual aspect. Habitual aspect in Hindi grammar is marked by the habitual participle. The habitual participle is constructed from the infinitive form of the verb by removing the infinitive marker -nā from the verb root and adding -tā. The participles agree with the gender and the number of the subject of the sentence which is marked by the vowel the participles end in. Periphrastic Hindustani verb forms consist of two elements. The first element is the aspect marker. The second element is the tense-mood marker.

There are four different copulas with which the habitual participle can be used: honā (to be, to happen), rêhnā (to stay, to remain), jānā (to go), and ānā (to come). These verbs, even when they are used as copula, themselves can be turned into aspectual participles and can be used with the default auxiliary verb honā (to be), hence forming sub-aspects that combine the nuance of two aspects. The auxiliary rêhnā (to stay) gives a nuance of continuity of the perfective state, jānā (to go) is used to construct the passive voice when used with the perfective participle, shows that the action is completed when it is used with intransitive verbs and shows continuity when it is used with habitual participle.

Simple Aspect	Habitual Aspect (infinitive forms)			
honā to happen	hotā honā to habitually happen	hotā rêhnā to keep happening	hotā jānā to progressively keep happening	hotā ānā to have been happening
karnā to do	kartā honā to habitually do	kartā rêhnā to keep doing	kartā jānā to progressively keep doing	kartā ānā to have been doing
marnā to die	martā honā to habitually die	martā rêhnā to keep dying	martā jānā to progressively keep dying	martā ānā to have been dying

Hindustani has three grammatical aspectsː habitual, perfective and progressive. Conjugating the auxiliary verbs, which are above in the infinitive form, into their aspectual forms using the auxiliary honā (to be) gives subaspectual forms for the habitual aspect in their infintive formː

Subaspects of the Habitual Aspect
rêhnā			jānā		ānā	
Habitual	Perfective	Progressive	Habitual	Progressive	Perfective	Progressive
hotā rêhtā honā to habitually keep happening	hotā rahā honā to have habitually kept happening	hotā rêh rahā honā to habitually have kept happening	hotā jātā honā to go on happening	hotā jā rahā honā to habitually keep on happening	hotā āyā honā to habitually have been happening	hotā ā rahā honā to habitually have kept happening
kartā rêhtā honā to habitually keep doing	kartā rahā honā to have habitually kept doing	kartā rêh rahā honā to habitually have kept doing	kartā jātā honā to go on doing	kartā jā rahā honā to habitually keep on doing	kartā āyā honā to habitually have been doing	kartā ā rahā honā to habitually have kept doing
martā rêhtā honā to habitually keep dying	martā rahā honā to have habitually kept dying	martā rêh rahā honā to habitually have kept dying	martā jātā honā to go on dying	martā jā rahā honā to habitually keep on dying	martā āyā honā to habitually have been dying	martā ā rahā honā to habitually have kept dying

== English ==
Standard English has two habitual aspectual forms in the past tense. One is illustrated by the sentence I used to go there frequently. The used to [infinitive] construction always refers to the habitual aspect when the infinitive is a non-stative verb; in contrast, when used to is used with a stative verb, the aspect can be interpreted as continuous (that is, it indicates an ongoing, unchanging state, as in I used to know that), although Bernard Comrie classifies this, too, as habitual. Used to can be used with or without an indicator of temporal location in the past (We used to do that, We used to do that in 1974); but the time indicator cannot be too specific; for example, *We used to do that at 3 pm yesterday is not grammatical.

The second way that habituality is expressed in the past is by using the auxiliary verb would, as in Last summer we would go there every day. This usage requires a lexical indication of when the action occurred; by itself the sentence We would go there does not express habituality, while We used to go there does even though it does not specify when. As with used to, would also has other uses in English that do not indicate habituality: in In January 1986 I knew I would graduate in four months, it indicates the future viewed from a past perspective; in I would go if I felt better, it indicates the conditional mood.

English can also indicate habituality in a time-unspecific way, referring generically to the past, present, and future, by using the auxiliary will as in He will make that mistake all the time, won't he?. As with used to and would, the auxiliary will has other uses as well: as an indicator of future time (The sun will rise tomorrow at 6:14), and as a modal verb indicating volition (At this moment I will not tolerate dissent).

Habitual aspect is frequently expressed in unmarked form in English, as in I walked to work every day for ten years, I walk to work every day, and I will walk to work every day after I get well.

The habitual and progressive aspects can be combined in English, as in He used to be playing.. Every time I visit, he's always making something.

Present tense

African American Vernacular English and Caribbean English use an invariant be to mark habitual or extended actions in the present tense. Some Hiberno-English in Ireland uses the construction do be to mark the habitual present.

== Romance languages ==
Romance languages like French, Spanish, Italian, and Portuguese do not have a grammatical form that is specific to the habitual aspect. In the past tense, they have a form called the imperfect, which combines the past tense with the imperfective aspect and indicates that a past ongoing process was habitual or continuous.

== Turkish ==
In Turkish, the aorist (Turkish: geniş zaman, lit. "broad time") is a habitual aspect, and is similar to the English present simple. For example, the statement Et yemem ("I do not eat meat") informs the listener that the speaker is vegetarian, not merely that he happens not to be eating meat at that very moment. To imply the latter, the present progressive Et yemiyorum ("I am not eating meat") is used instead.

== Cantonese ==
Cantonese, a Sinitic language, has a dedicated particle to express the habitual aspect, 開 hoi^{1}, which follows the verb. This is unlike Mandarin and some other Sinitic languages, which have no grammatical indicators of the habitual aspect, but may express habituality via circumlocution.

== See also ==
- Yuchi language#Phonology
