= Iterative aspect =

Grammatical aspect expressing the repetition of an event on a single occasion

In linguistics, the iterative aspect (abbreviated ITER), also called "semelfactive", "event-internal pluractionality", or "multiplicative", is a grammatical aspect described by some authors as expressing the repetition of an event observable on one single occasion, as in 'he knocked on the door', 'he coughed', 'she is drumming', etc. It is not to be confused with frequentative aspect and habitual aspect, both of which signal repetition over more than one occasion.

Other authors have reserved the term "semelfactive" for this mono-occasional repetition, and defined iterative aspect as denoting 'several' repetitions over more than one occasion, as opposed to the 'frequent' repetitions conveyed by frequentative aspect.
