= Stative verb =

Verb that describes a state of being

In linguistics, a stative verb is a verb that describes a state of being, in contrast to a dynamic verb, which describes an action. The difference can be categorized by saying that stative verbs describe situations that are static, or unchanging throughout their entire duration, and dynamic verbs describe processes that entail change over time. Many languages distinguish between the two types in terms of how they can be used grammatically.

== Contrast to dynamic ==
Some languages use the same verbs for dynamic and stative situations, and others use different (but often related) verbs with some kind of qualifiers to distinguish between them. Some verbs may act as either stative or dynamic. A phrase like "he plays the piano" may be either stative or dynamic, according to the context. When in a given context, the verb "play" relates to a state (an interest or a profession), he could be an amateur who enjoys music or a professional pianist. The dynamic interpretation emerges from a specific context in the case "play" describes an action: "what does he do on Friday evening? He plays the piano".

The distinction between stative and dynamic verbs can be correlated with:

- the distinction between intransitive and transitive
- the possibility of using the progressive aspect with the verb
- morphological markers

=== Progressive aspect ===
In English and certain other languages, stative and dynamic verbs differ in whether or not they typically occur in a progressive form. Dynamic verbs such as "go" can be used in the progressive (I am going to school) whereas stative verbs such as "know" cannot (*I am knowing the answer). A verb that has both dynamic and stative uses cannot normally be used in the progressive when a stative meaning is intended: e.g. one cannot normally say, idiomatically, "Every morning, I am going to school". In other languages, statives can be used in the progressive as well; in Korean, for example, the sentence 미나가 인호를 사랑하고 있다 (Mina is loving Inho) is perfectly valid.

=== Morphological markers ===
In some languages, stative and dynamic verbs will use entirely different morphological markers on the verbs themselves. For example, in the Mantauran dialect of Rukai, an indigenous language of Taiwan, the two types of verbs take different prefixes in their finite forms, with dynamic verbs taking o- and stative verbs taking ma-. Thus, the dynamic verb "jump" is o-coroko in the active voice, and the stative verb "love" is ma-ðalamə. This sort of marking is characteristic of other Formosan languages as well.

== Difference from inchoative ==
In English, a verb that expresses a state can also express the entrance into a state. This is called inchoative aspect. The simple past is sometimes inchoative. For example, the present-tense verb in the sentence "He understands his friend" is stative, and the past-tense verb in the sentence "Suddenly he understood what she said" is inchoative because it means that he understood henceforth. On the other hand, the past-tense verb in "At one time, he understood her" is stative.

The only way the difference between stative and inchoative can be expressed in English is through the use of modifiers, as in the above examples ("suddenly" and "at one time").

Likewise, in Ancient Greek, a verb that expresses a state (e.g., ebasíleuon 'I was king') may use the aorist to express entrance into the state (e.g., ebasíleusa 'I became king'). However, the aorist can also simply express the state as a whole, with no focus on the beginning of the state (eíkosi étē ebasíleusa 'I ruled for twenty years').

== English ==
=== Dowty's analysis ===
Dowty gives several tests to decide whether an English verb is stative. They are as follows:

1. Statives do not occur in the progressive:
  - John is running. (non-stative)
  - *John is knowing the answer.
2. They cannot be complements of "force":
  - I forced John to run.
  - *I forced John to know the answer.
3. They do not occur as imperatives except when used in an inchoative manner.
  - Run!
  - *Know the answer!
  - Know thyself! (inchoative, not stative; archaic)
4. They cannot appear in the pseudo-cleft construction:
  - What John did was run.
  - *What John did was know the answer.

=== Categories ===
Stative verbs are often divided into sub-categories, based on their semantics or syntax.

Semantic divisions mainly involve verbs that express someone's state of mind, or something's properties (of course, things may also be expressed via other language mechanisms as well, particularly adjectives). The precise categories vary by linguist.

Huddleston and Pullum, for example, divide stative verbs into the following semantic categories: verbs of perception and sensation (see, hear), verbs of hurting (ache, itch), stance verbs (stand, sit), and verbs of cognition, emotion, and sensation (believe, regret). Novakov, meanwhile, uses the slightly different categories: verbs denoting sensations (feel, hear), verbs denoting reasoning and mental attitude (believe, understand), verbs denoting positions/stance (lie, surround), and verbs denoting relations (resemble, contain).

Syntactic divisions involve the types of clause structures in which a verb may be used. In the following examples, an asterisk (*) indicates that the sentence is ungrammatical:

- John believes that Fido is a dog.

John believes in Fido barking.
John believes Fido to bark.

- *Joan depends that Fido is a dog.

Joan depends on Fido barking.
*Joan depends Fido to bark.

- Jim loathes that Fido is a dog.

*Jim loathes on Fido barking.
*Jim loathes Fido to bark.

== See also ==
- Lexical aspect
- Copula
- Active–stative alignment
