= Simple past =

Basic form of the past tense in Modern English

The simple past, past simple, or past indefinite, in English equivalent to the preterite, is the basic form of the past tense in Modern English. It is used principally to describe events in the past, although it also has some other uses. Regular English verbs form the past simple in -ed; however, there are a few hundred irregular verbs with different forms.

The term simple is used to distinguish the syntactical construction whose basic form uses the plain past tense alone, from other past tense constructions which use auxiliaries in combination with participles, such as the present perfect, past perfect, and past progressive.

== Formation ==
Regular verbs form the past simple end-ed; however there are a few hundred irregular verbs with different forms. The spelling rules for forming the past simple of regular verbs are as follows: verbs ending in -e add only –d to the end (e.g. live – lived, not *liveed), verbs ending in -y change to -ied (e.g. study – studied) and verbs ending in a group of a consonant + a vowel + a consonant double the final consonant (e.g. stop – stopped). For details see English verbs § Past tense.

Most verbs have a single form of the past simple, independent of the person or number of the subject (there is no addition of -s for the third person singular as in the present simple). However, the copula verb be has two past tense forms: was for the first and third persons singular, and were in other instances. The form were can also be used in place of was in conditional clauses and the like; for information on this, see English subjunctive. This is the only case in modern English where a distinction in form is made between inversion, negations with not, and emphatic forms of the past simple use the auxiliary did. For details of this mechanism, see do-support. A full list of forms is given below, using the (regular) verb help as an example:

- Basic past simple:
  - I/you/he/she/it/we/they helped
- Expanded (emphatic) past simple:
  - I/you/he/she/it/we/they did help
- Question form:
  - Did I/you/he/she/it/we/they help?
- Negative:
  - I/you/he/she/it/we/they did not (didn't) help
- Negative question:
  - Did I/you/he/she/it/we/they not help? / Didn't I/you/he/she/it/we/they help?

Base form

Affirmative (+) S + verb(ed) + c

Negative (-) S + did not ( didn't) + verb + C

== Usage ==
The past simple is used for a single event (or sequence of such events) in the past, and also for past habitual actions:

He took the money and ran.
I visited them every day for a year.

It can also refer to a past state:

I knew how to fight even as a child.

For actions that were ongoing at the time referred to, the past progressive is generally used instead (e.g. I was cooking). The same can apply to states, if temporary (e.g. the ball was lying on the sidewalk), but some stative verbs do not generally use the progressive aspect at all, typically verbs of mental states (know, believe, need), of emotional states (love, dislike, prefer), of possession (have, own), of senses (hear) and some others (consist, exist, promise) – see Uses of English verb forms § Progressive – and in these cases the past simple is used even for a temporary state:

The dog was in its kennel.
I felt cold.

However, with verbs of sensing, it is common in such circumstances to use could see in place of saw, could hear in place of heard, etc. For more on this, see can see.

If one action interrupts another, then it is usual for the interrupted (ongoing) action to be expressed with the past progressive, and the action that interrupted it to be in the past simple:

Your mother called while you were cooking.

The past simple is often close in meaning to the present perfect. The past simple is used when the event happened at a particular time in the past, or during a period which ended in the past (i.e. a period that does not last up until the present time). This time frame may be explicitly stated, or implicit in the context (for example the past tense is often used when describing a sequence of past events).

I was born in 1980.
We turned the oven off two minutes ago.
I came home at 6 o'clock.
When did they get married?
We wrote two letters this morning.
She placed the letter on the table, sighed, and left the house.

These examples can be contrasted with those given at Uses of English verb forms § Present perfect. Also, for past actions that occurred before the relevant past time frame, the past perfect is used.

Various compound constructions exist for denoting past habitual action. The sentence When I was young, I played football every Saturday might alternatively be phrased using used to (... I used to play ...) or using would (... I would play...).

The past simple form also has some uses in which it does not refer to a past time. These are generally in condition clauses and some other dependent clauses referring to hypothetical circumstances, as well as certain expressions of wish:

If he walked faster, he would get home earlier.
I wish I knew what his name was.
I would rather she wore a longer dress.

For more details see the sections on conditionals, dependent clauses and expressions of wish in the article on uses of English verb forms.

For use of the past simple (and other past tense forms) in indirect speech, see Uses of English verb forms § Indirect speech. An example:

He said he wanted to go on the slide.

== Pronunciation of -ed ==
The regular verbs ending with -ed are pronounced as follows:

- Regular verb endings with voiced consonants+/d/, e.g. hugged /hʌɡd/.
- Regular verb endings with unvoiced consonants+/t/, e.g. stopped /stɒpt/.
- Regular verb endings with /t/ or /d/ + /ɪd/, e.g. needed /niːdɪd/.

== See also ==
- English verbs
- Uses of English verb forms
- Preterite
- Past tense

Other tenses:

- Present simple
- Present perfect
