= Lexical aspect =

Semantic way in which a verb is structured in relation to time

In linguistics, the lexical aspect, situation type or Aktionsart (German pronunciation: [ʔakˈtsi̯oːnsˌʔaːɐ̯t], plural Aktionsarten German pronunciation: [ʔakˈtsi̯oːnsˌʔaːɐ̯tn̩]) of an event is part of the way in which that event is structured in relation to time. For example, the English verbs arrive and run differ in their lexical aspect since the former describes an event which has a natural endpoint while the latter does not. Lexical aspect differs from grammatical aspect in that it is an inherent semantic property of a predicate, while grammatical aspect is a syntactic or morphological property. Although lexical aspect need not be marked morphologically, it has downstream grammatical effects, for instance that arrive can be modified by "in an hour" while believe cannot.

== Theories of aspectual class ==
Although all theories of lexical aspect recognize that verbs divide into different classes, the details of the classification differ. An early attempt by Vendler recognized four classes, which has been modified several times.

=== Vendler's classification ===
Zeno Vendler classified verbs into four categories on whether they express "activity", "accomplishment", "achievement" or "state". Activities and accomplishments are distinguished from achievements and states in that the first two allow the use of continuous and progressive aspects. Activities and accomplishments are distinguished from each other by boundedness. Activities do not have a terminal point (a point before which the activity has taken place and after which it cannot continue: "John drew a circle"), but accomplishments have one. Of achievements and states, achievements are instantaneous, but states are durative. Achievements and accomplishments are distinguished from one another in that achievements take place immediately (such as in "recognise" or "find"), but accomplishments approach an endpoint incrementally (as in "paint a picture" or "build a house").

=== Comrie's classification ===
In his discussion of lexical aspect, Bernard Comrie included the category semelfactive or punctual events such as "sneeze". His divisions of the categories were as follows: states, activities, and accomplishments are durative, but semelfactives and achievements are punctual. Of the durative verbs, states are unique as they involve no change, and activities are atelic (that is, have no "terminal point") whereas accomplishments are telic. Of the punctual verbs, semelfactives are atelic, and achievements are telic. The following table shows examples of lexical aspect in English that involve change (an example of a state is 'know').

	Punctual	Durative
Telic	Achievement (to release)	Accomplishment (to drown)
Atelic	Semelfactive (to knock)	Activity (to walk)
Static		State (to know)

=== Moens and Steedman's classification ===
Another classification is proposed by Moens and Steedman, based on the idea of the event nucleus.

	Event nucleus		
	Preparatory phase	Culminating event	Consequent phase
Semelfactive			
State			
Activity			
Achievement			
Accomplishment			

== See also ==
- Predicate
- Syntax–semantics interface
