= Present continuous =

Form of present continuous

The present continuous, also called the present progressive or present imperfect, is a verb form used in modern English that combines the present tense with the continuous aspect. It is formed by the present tense form of be and the present participle of a verb. The present continuous is generally used to describe something that is taking place at the present moment and can be employed in both the indicative and subjunctive moods. According to an analysis of verb usage by tense and aspect, the present continuous accounts for around 5% of verb conjugation in spoken English.

== Formation ==
The present continuous is formed by the present tense form of be and the present participle (-ing form) of the verb.

For example, the verb work is written in the present continuous form by adding the -ing suffix to the verb and placing a present tense form of be (am, are, is) in front of it:

- I am working.
- You are working.
- She is working.
- We are working.
- They are working.

== Uses ==
The present continuous is used in several instances. Its most common use is to describe something that is happening at the exact moment of speech:

- The boy is laughing.

This contrasts with the simple present, which is used to refer to something that occurs habitually (i.e. habits, unchanging situations, general truths, and fixed arrangements).

The present continuous is also used to describe a temporary activity, even if it is not taking place at the exact moment of speech, or a temporary situation:

- They are working in Dubai.
- I am writing a book.
- I am living in Scotland until the end of the year.

This contrasts with permanent activities or situations, which are described using the simple present: I live on Main Street.

Present continuous can also describe an event planned in the future, particularly when combined with a time indicator for the future:

- I am resitting my French exam on Tuesday.
- What're we having (for a meal)?

When combined with always, but meaning 'often', the present continuous can be used to emphasize the frequency of an action in a humorous or hyperbolic way:

- My parents are always making me go to school!
- She is always playing with that doll!
- He is always eating chocolate!

== See also ==
- Simple present
- Uses of English verb forms
