= Perfective aspect =

Grammatical aspect which present actions as having no internal composition

The perfective aspect (abbreviated pfv), sometimes called the aoristic aspect, is a grammatical aspect that describes an action viewed as a simple whole, i.e., a unit without interior composition. The perfective aspect is distinguished from the imperfective aspect, which presents an event as having internal structure (such as ongoing, continuous, or habitual actions). The term perfective should be distinguished from perfect (see below).

The distinction between perfective and imperfective is more important in some languages than others. In Slavic languages, it is central to the verb system. In other languages such as German, the same form such as ich ging ("I went", "I was going") can be used perfectively or imperfectively without grammatical distinction. In other languages such as Latin, the distinction between perfective and imperfective is made only in the past tense (e.g., Latin veni "I came" vs. veniebam "I was coming", "I used to come"). However, perfective should not be confused with tense—perfective aspect can apply to events in the past, present, or future.

The perfective is often thought of as for events of short duration (e.g., "John killed the wasp"). However, this is not necessarily true—a perfective verb is equally right for a long-lasting event, provided that it is a complete whole; e.g., Tarquinius Superbus regnavit annos quinque et viginti (Livy) "Tarquin the Proud reigned for 25 years." It simply "presents an occurrence in summary, viewed as a whole from the outside, without regard for the internal make-up of the occurrence."

The perfective is also sometimes described as referring to a "completed" action, but it would be more accurate to say that it refers to an action or situation that is seen as a complete whole; e.g., the Russian perfective future я убью тебя "I shall kill you" refers to an event that has not yet been completed.

The essence of the perfective is an event seen as a whole. However, most languages that have a perfective use it for various similar semantic roles—such as momentary events and the onsets or completions of events, all of which are single points in time and thus have no internal structure. Other languages instead have separate momentane, inchoative, or cessative aspects for those roles, with or without a general perfective.

== Equivalents in English ==
English has neither a simple perfective nor imperfective aspect; see imperfective for some basic English equivalents of this distinction.

When translating into English from a language that has these aspects, the translator sometimes uses separate English verbs. For example, in Spanish, the imperfective sabía can be translated "I knew" vs. the perfective supe "I found out", podía "I was able to" vs. pude "I succeeded", quería "I wanted to" vs. quise "I tried to", no quería "I did not want to" vs. no quise "I refused". The Polish perfective aspect is translated into English as a simple tense and the imperfective as a continuous; for example the imperfective oglądałem is translated into "I was watching", while the perfective obejrzałem is translated into "I watched". Such distinctions are often language-specific.

== Marking ==
Languages may mark perfective aspect with morphology, syntactic construction, lexemes/particles, or other means.

- Older Germanic languages: the aspect prefixes ge- (in Old English), gi- (in Old Saxon and Old High German), and ga- (in Gothic) indicate perfective aspects of verbs.
- Thai: the aspect marker ขึ้น /kʰɯ̂n/, grammaticalized from the word for "ascend," indicates a certain type of underconstrained perfective aspect when it follows a main verb
- Hindi: the perfective aspect is marked using the perfective aspect participle. The perfective participle is constructed as shown in the table below, the consonant -य्- (-y-) is added to the perfective suffix when the verb root ends in a vowel.

Perfective Participle in Hindi
	verb root ending in a consonant		verb root ending in a vowel	
	♂	♀	♂	♀
Singular	ा -ā	ी -ī	-या -yā	-यी -yī
Plural	े -ē	ीं -ī̃	-ये -yē	-यीं -yī̃

== Perfective vs. perfect ==
The terms perfective and perfect should not be confused.

A perfective tense describes whole, complete actions without referring to how long the action required (see internal temporal structure). For example, "She typed that article."

A perfect tense (abbreviated perf or prf) is a grammatical form used to describe a past event with present relevance, or a present state resulting from a past situation. For example, "I have put it on the table" implies both that I put the object on the table and that it is still there; "I have been to France" conveys that this is a part of the speaker's experience as of the spoken moment; and "I have lost my wallet" implies that this loss is troublesome at the present moment. A perfect tense does not necessarily have to be perfective in aspect. For example, "I have been waiting here for an hour" and "I have been going to that doctor all my life" are perfect but also imperfective in aspect.

There are some languages, however, such as Modern Greek, in which the perfect tense is always perfective.

== Examples ==
=== Hindustani ===
Hindustani (aka Hindi-Urdu) has 3 grammatical aspects: Habitual, Perfective and Progressive. Each aspect is constructed from its participle and a number of auxiliary verbs can be used with the aspectual participles such as: honā (to be, to happen), rêhnā (to stay, to remain), jānā (to go), ānā (to come), and karnā (to do). These verbs themselves can be made into aspectual participles and can be used with the default auxiliary verb honā (to be), hence forming sub-aspects that combine the nuance of two aspects. The auxiliary rêhnā (to stay) gives a nuance of continuity of the perfective state, jānā (to go) is used to construct the passive voice (in its habitual subaspect) and also shows that the action is completed (in its perfective subaspect), karnā (to do) gives the nuance that the perfective action is repeated habitually.

Simple Aspect	Perfective Aspect (infinitive forms)			
honā to happen	huā honā to have happened	huā rêhnā to have happened	*huā jānā x	huā karnā to happen
karnā to do	kiyā honā to have done	kiyā rêhnā to have done	kiyā jānā to be done	kiyā karnā to do
marnā to die	marā honā to have died	marā rêhnā to have died	marā jānā to die	marā karnā to die

^{1} The auxiliary jānā (to go) can only be used with the perfective aspect participle if the verb is transitive, or intransitive but volitional. So, *huā jānā is not valid construction. marnā (to die) is intransitive but it's a volitional action and hence marā jānā is a valid construction.
Note: Most nuances generated by the auxiliaries are not uniquely expressed in English and hence many verbs above have the same translation in English but don't have the same nuances in Hindi-Urdu.

Conjugating the auxiliary verbs which are in the infinitive form above into their aspectual forms using the auxiliary honā (to be) gives the following subaspectual forms of the perfective aspect in their infinitive form:

Perfective Aspect
rêhnā		jānā			karnā
Habitual	Perfective	Habitual (Note: When the auxiliary jānā (to go) is used, only transitive and volitional intransitive verbs can be put into the habitual and perfective subaspect. So, *huā jātā honā and *huā gāyā honā are not valid constructions.)	Perfective	Progressive (Note: The construction huā jā rahā honā somehow is a valid construction but it means the same (but more emphasised) as hotā jā rahā honā which is the progressive subaspect of the habitual aspect using the auxiliary jānā (to go).)	Habitual
huā rêhtā honā to stay happened	huā rahā honā to have stayed happened	*huā jātā honā x	*huā gāyā honā x	huā jā rahā honā to keep happening continuously	huā kartā honā to happen perfectively and habitually
kiyā rêhtā honā to stay done	kiyā rahā honā to have stayed done	kiyā jātā honā to be done	kiyā gayā honā to have been done	kiyā jā rahā honā to have been doing continuously	kiyā kartā honā to do perfectively and habitually
marā rêhtā honā to stay dead	marā rahā honā to have stayed dead	marā jātā honā to be dead	marā gayā honā to have killed oneself	marā jā rahā honā to have been dying continuously	marā kartā honā to die perfectively and habitually (Note: This usage of this verb is limited to contexts such as "dying in a videogame")

== See also ==
- Ancient Greek verbs § Meanings of the tenses
- Chinese grammar § Aspects
- Grammatical aspect in Slavic languages
