= List of Spanish irregular participles =

In the Spanish language there are some verbs with irregular past participles. There are also verbs with both regular and irregular participles, in which the irregular form is most used as an adjective, while the regular form tends to appear after haber to form compound perfect tenses.

== Agreement ==
When a participle is used as adjective, it must agree in gender and number with the noun modified:

	Masculine	Feminine
Singular	-o	-a
Plural	-os	-as

== Verbs with irregular participles ==
Verb	Participle	Meaning
abrir	abierto	'open(ed)'
cubrir	cubierto	'covered'
decir	dicho	'said'
escribir	escrito	'written'
-scribir^{1}	-scri(p)to^{2}	—
hacer	hecho	'done, made'
-facer^{1}	-fecho	—
morir	muerto	'died, dead'
poner	puesto	'put, placed'
pudrir	podrido	'rotten'
romper	roto	'broken'
-solver^{1}	-suelto	'solved'
ver	visto	'seen'
volver	vuelto	'(re)turned'

^{1}The roots -scribir, -facer, and -solver appear only in prefixed forms, e.g. inscribir, satisfacer, absolver (although a verb solver was attested). The adjective suelto means 'loose, free'. ^{2}The variant -scripto is used in Argentina, Paraguay, and Uruguay.

Verbs derived from the stems in the table above have participles similar to those of their "parent" verbs — e.g. devolver → devuelto, componer → compuesto. Note, however, that this pattern is not followed by corromper, whose participle is regular (corrompido), nor by bendecir and maldecir (bendecido and maldecido; the forms bendito and maldito are nowadays only used as adjectives or nouns, maldicho persists in Judeo-Spanish).

== Verbs with regular and irregular participles ==
Verb	Regular Participle	Irregular Participle	Meaning
elegir	elegido	electo	'elected, selected'
freír	freído	frito	'fried'
imprimir	imprimido	impreso	'printed'
prender	prendido	preso	'arrested'
proveer	proveído	provisto	'supplied'

A number of former irregular participles, such as confuso ('confused', from confundir), poseso ('possessed', from poseer), and suspenso ('suspended, hung', from suspender), are nowadays used solely as adjectives, not as participles, and are therefore no longer considered as such.

== See also ==
- Spanish verbs
- Spanish conjugation
