= Spanish irregular verbs =

Irregular verbs in the Spanish language

Spanish verbs are a complex area of Spanish grammar, with many combinations of tenses, aspects and moods (up to fifty conjugated forms per verb). Although conjugation rules are relatively straightforward, a large number of verbs are irregular. Among these, some fall into more-or-less defined deviant patterns, whereas others are uniquely irregular. This article summarizes the common irregular patterns.

As in all Romance languages, many irregularities in Spanish verbs can be retraced to Latin grammar.

== Orthographic changes ==
Due to the rules of Spanish orthography, some predictable changes are needed to keep the same consonant sound before a or o and e or i, but these are not usually considered irregularities. The following examples use the first person plural of the present subjunctive:

- /k/: c—qu: tocar > toquemos (-car), delinquir > delincamos (-quir).
- /θ/: z—c: gozar > gocemos (-zar), vencer > venzamos (-cer).
- /x/: g—j: proteger > protejamos (-ger). But in verbs ending in -jar, the j is kept before e: mojar > mojemos (not *mogemos).
- /ɡ/: g—gu: negar > neguemos (-gar), distinguir > distingamos (-guir).
- /ɡw/: gu—gü: averiguar > averigüemos (-guar).

Other predictable changes involve stress marks, i—y alternations and i-dropping, some of which are sometimes considered as irregularities. These examples are several forms of otherwise regular preterites:

- Stress mark on stressed i after a, e or o: caer > caímos (-caer), leer > leímos (-eer), oír > oímos (-ír, -oír); this does not apply to any G-verbs such as traer and its related forms.
- Stress mark not used in monosyllabic forms: liar > lie /lje/, lio /ljo/; ver > vi, vio. However, before 2010, the forms lié /liˈe/ and lió /liˈo/, fié and fió, guié and guió, and crié and crió could also be written with the accent mark by writers who pronounce these forms as bisyllabic. But this option was not available for vio.
- Unstressed i is written y between non-silent vowels: caer > cayó, cayeron (-aer, -caer); construir > construyó, construyeron (-uir). This does not apply to verbs ending in -quir (for example, delinquir > delinquió, delinquieron).
- Unstressed i is dropped between ll or ñ and a vowel: bullir > bulló (not *bullió) (-llir/-ñir), tañer > tañó (-ñer).

== Stem-vowel changes ==
There are two kinds of changes that can affect stem vowels of some Spanish verbs: diphthongization and vowel raising. Both changes affect -e- or -o- in the last (or only) syllable of a verb stem. Diphthongization changes -e- to -ie-, and -o- to -ue-. Vowel raising changes the mid vowels -e- and -o- to the corresponding high vowels: -i- and -u- respectively. Some verbs, in their various forms, can exhibit both kinds of changes (e.g. sentir, siente, sintió (e-ie-i); dormir, duerme, durmió) (o-ue-u).

=== Diphthongization ===
The identities of verbs that diphthongize -e- to -ie- and -o- to -ue- are not marked and must be learned individually. In a diphthongizing verb, the change occurs when the stem syllable is stressed, which in effect happens only in the singular persons and third-person plural of the present tense and in the imperative. In the other forms, including the infinitive, are stressed on their endings, not their stems. Exceptionally, the -u- of jugar (u-ue -gar, -jugar) and the -i- of verbs derived from querer like inquirir (i-ie) also are subject to diphthongization (juega; inquiere).

Word-initially, *ie- is written ye- (errar > yerro) (e-ie > ye) and *ue- is written hue- (oler > huele) (o-ue > hue, oler). Also, the -ue- diphthong is written -üe- after g, with the diaeresis to indicate that the letter is not silent (avergonzarse > me avergüenzo) (reflexive, go-güe -zar).

The following table shows contrasting forms for both types diphthongization, and the irregular -quirir and jugar:

Vowel diphthongizing verbs
Verb		yo	tú	vos	él/ ella; usted	nosotr(os/as)	vosotr(os/as)	ell(os/as); ustedes
pensar/ pensando/ pensado	indicative present	pienso	piensas	pensás	piensa	pensamos	pensáis	piensan
pensar/ pensando/ pensado	subjunctive present	piense	pienses	pensés*	piense	pensemos	penséis	piensen
pensar/ pensando/ pensado	imperative	—	piensa no pienses	pensá no pensés*	piense	pensemos	pensad no pensáis	piensen
oler/ oliendo/ olido	indicative present	huelo	hueles	olés	huele	olemos	oléis	huelen
oler/ oliendo/ olido	subjunctive present	huela	huelas	olás	huela	olamos	oláis	huelan
oler/ oliendo/ olido	imperative	—	huele no huelas	olé no olás*	huela	olamos	oled no oláis	huelan
inquirir/ inquiriendo/ inquirido	indicative present	inquiero	inquieres	inquirís	inquiere	inquiremos	inquirís	inquieren
inquirir/ inquiriendo/ inquirido	subjunctive present	inquiera	inquieras	inquirás*	inquiera	inquiramos	inquiráis	inquieran
inquirir/ inquiriendo/ inquirido	imperative	—	inquiere no inquieras	inquirí no inquirás*	inquiera	inquiramos	inquirid no inquieráis	inquieran
jugar/ jugando/ jugado	indicative present	juego	juegas	jugás	juega	jugamos	jugáis	juegan
jugar/ jugando/ jugado	subjunctive present	juegue	juegues	jugués*	juegue	juguemos	juguéis	jueguen
jugar/ jugando/ jugado	imperative	—	juega no juegues	jugá no jugués*	juegue	juguemos	jugad no juguéis	jueguen

* In Central America pensés, contés, etc. are used in the subjunctive present and imperative, but the Royal Spanish Academy prescribes pienses, cuentes, etc., as in Rioplatense Spanish.

The verbs sentir and dormir also undergo vowel raising. Additional diphthongizing verbs include acordar(se) (o-ue), divertir(se) (e-ie), doler (o-ue), empezar (-zar e-ie, -ezar), encontrar (o-ue), entender (e-ie), llover (o-ue), morir (o-ue, -morir), mostrar (o-ue), mover (o-ue), poder (o-ue, -poder), probar (o-ue), querer (e-ie, -querer), recordar (o-ue), sentar(se) (e-ie-i), tener (e-ie, -tener, G-Verb), venir (e-ie, -venir, G-Verb), volar (o-ue), and volver (o-ue, -olver).

Many verbs with -e- or -o- in the root do not alternate. Common non-diphthongizing verbs include acercar(se), aprender, beber, ceder, coger², colar, comer, comprar, conocer, correr, creer, deber, dejar, entrar, esperar, importar, joder¹, lamentar, llegar, llevar, meter, parecer, perecer, poner, prometer, quedar, regresar, responder, robar, soportar, suceder, temer, tomar, among others. Less frequent verbs of this kind are often a source of mistakes for children learning to speak, and also for some adults:

- rebosar → yo *rebueso, él/ella *rebuesa... instead of yo reboso, él rebosa...

=== Vowel raising ===
Vowel raising appears only in -ir verbs, and in this group it affects dormir, morir, podrir (an alternative of the more common pudrir) and nearly all verbs which have -e- as their last stem vowel (e.g. sentir, repetir). Exceptions to that last rule include cernir and its derivatives, which are only diphthongizing.

==== Affected forms ====
The forms that exhibit the change can be described negatively as those in which the stem vowel is not diphthongized and the ending does not contain stressed i or the -ir- sequence. In other words, vowel raising affects the forms whose endings do not contain an i which is not part of a diphthong, taking into account that diphthongizing overrides vowel raising.

For diphthongizing verbs (e.g. dormir, sentir), the vowel-raising forms are:

- the first-person and second-person plural of the present subjunctive (sintamos, sintáis, durmamos, durmáis);
- the present active participle or gerund (sintiendo, durmiendo);
- the third-person indicative past perfect (sintió, sintieron, durmió, durmieron);
- all forms of the subjunctive imperfect past (sintiera/sintiese..., durmiera/durmiese...) and of the future subjunctive (sintiere..., durmiere...).

For non-diphthongizing verbs (e.g. pedir) it affects these same forms (pidamos, pidáis, pidiendo, pidió, pidieron, pidiera...), plus:

- the singulars and third person plural of the present indicative (pido, pides, pide, piden);
- the remaining forms of the present subjunctive (pida, pidas, pidan);
- the tú form of the imperative (pide), but not the vos nor vosotros forms.

The forms which undergo neither diphthongizing nor vowel raising are:

- the first-person and second-person plural of the indicative present (sentimos, sentís), because these forms have stressed i in their endings.
- the infinitive (sentir), past participle (sentido), indicative imperfect past (sentía...) and the vos and vosotros forms of the imperative (sentí, sentid), for the same reason.
- the future (sentiré...) and conditional (sentiría...), whose endings contain the -ir- sequence and derive from the infinitive.

==== Affected verbs ====
Vowel-raising but not diphthongizing verbs include:

- those ending in -edir (medir, pedir...), -egir (elegir, regir), and -etir (competir, repetir)
  - those ending in -eír (desleír, freír, reír). Double i that would result is simplified (rieron, not *riieron nor *riyeron). The stressed i in contact with a/e/o must take an acute accent (río, ríe, ría); monosyllabic forms of the indicative perfect past tense do not have it (though it was officially allowed until 2010).
  - those ending in -eñir (ceñir, teñir...). As usual, the unstressed i between ñ and a vowel is dropped (tiñendo, tiñó, tiñeron, tiñera...).
- decir and derived verbs (bendecir, predecir...), in forms that do not have overriding irregularities.
- erguir. Usually diphthongizing (with ye- forms such as yergo), there are raised forms that are valid but rare (irgo).
- hacer and derived verbs (-facer, like satisfacer), which goes from -a- to -i- in forms that do not have overriding irregularities. The -facer derivatives take forms identical to hacer but with an initial f- instead of an initial h-.
- podrir. The affected forms are equal to those derived from the more usual infinitive pudrir, which is regular except in the past participle podrido.
- vestir and derived verbs (including embestir)

The following table demonstrates the contrasting forms for both types of raising, as well as the irregular decir and hacer.

Vowel-raising verbs
Verb		yo	tú	vos	él/ ella; usted	nosotr(os/as)	vosotr(os/as)	ell(os/as); ustedes
pedir-pidiendo-pedido	indicative present	pido	pides	pedís	pide	pedimos	pedís	piden
pedir-pidiendo-pedido	indicative perfect past	pedí	pediste		pidió	pedimos	pedisteis	pidieron
pedir-pidiendo-pedido	subjunctive present	pida	pidas	pidás	pida	pidamos	pidáis	pidan
pedir-pidiendo-pedido	subjunctive past	pidiera	pidieras		pidiera	pidiéramos	pidierais	pidieran
pedir-pidiendo-pedido	imperative	—	pide no pidas	pedí no pidas	pida	pidamos	pedid no pidáis	pidan
podrir-pudriendo-podrido	indicative present	pudro	pudres	podrís	pudre	podrimos	podrís	pudren
podrir-pudriendo-podrido	indicative perfect past	podrí	podriste		pudrió	podrimos	podristeis	pudrieron
podrir-pudriendo-podrido	subjunctive present	pudra	pudras		pudra	pudramos	pudráis	pudran
podrir-pudriendo-podrido	subjunctive past	pudiera	pudieras		pudiera	pudiéramos	pudierais	pudieran
podrir-pudriendo-podrido	imperative	—	pudre no pudras	podrí no pudras	pudra	pudramos	podrid no pudráis	pudran
decir-diciendo-dicho	indicative present	digo	dices	decís	dice	decimos	decís	dicen
decir-diciendo-dicho	indicative perfect past	dije	dijiste		dijo	dijimos	dijisteis	dijeron
decir-diciendo-dicho	subjunctive present	diga	digas	digás	diga	digamos	digáis	digan
decir-diciendo-dicho	subjunctive past	dijera	dijeras		dijera	dijéramos	dijerais	dijeran
decir-diciendo-dicho	imperative	—	di no digas	decí no digas	diga	digamos	decid no digáis	digan
hacer-haciendo-hecho	indicative present	hago	haces	hacés	hace	hacemos	hacéis	hacen
hacer-haciendo-hecho	indicative perfect past	hice	hiciste		hice	hicimos	hicisteis	hicieron
hacer-haciendo-hecho	subjunctive present	haga	hagas	hagás	haga	hagamos	hagáis	hagan
hacer-haciendo-hecho	subjunctive past	hiciera	hicieras		hicera	hiciéramos	hicierais	hicieran
hacer-haciendo-hecho	imperative	—	haz no hagas	hacé no hagas	haga	hagamos	haced no hagáis	hagan

Diphthongizing and vowel-raising verbs include:

- those ending in -entir (arrepentirse, mentir, sentir...) and -ertir (advertir, convertir ...).
  - those ending in -erir (digerir, herir, preferir, requerir...), except aterir.
- dormir, morir, and poder
- venir and derived verbs (convenir, prevenir...), in the forms that do not undergo overriding irregularities.

The following table demonstrates the contrasting forms of both an e-ie-i verb and an o-ue-u verb, along with the irregular venir:

Vowel-raising and vowel-diphthongizing verbs
Verb		yo	tú	vos	él/ ella; usted	nosotr(os/as)	vosotr(os/as)	ell(os/as); ustedes
sentir/ sintiendo/ sentido	indicative present	siento	sientes	sentís	siente	sentimos	sentís	sienten
sentir/ sintiendo/ sentido	indicative perfect past	sentí	sentiste		sintió	sentimos	sentisteis	sintieron
sentir/ sintiendo/ sentido	subjunctive present	sienta	sientas	sentás	sienta	sentamos	sentáis	sientan
sentir/ sintiendo/ sentido	subjunctive past	sintiera	sintieras		sintiera	sintiéramos	sintierais	sintieran
sentir/ sintiendo/ sentido	imperative	—	siente no sientas	sentí no sientas	sienta	sentamos	sentid no sentáis	sientan
dormir/ durmiendo/ dormido	indicative present	duermo	duermes	dormís	duerme	dormimos	dormís	duermen
dormir/ durmiendo/ dormido	indicative perfect past	dormí	dormiste		durmió	dormimos	dormisteis	durmieron
dormir/ durmiendo/ dormido	subjunctive present	duerma	duermas	dormás	duerma	dormamos	dormáis	duerman
dormir/ durmiendo/ dormido	subjunctive past	durmiera	durmieras		durmiera	durmiéramos	durmierais	durmieran
dormir/ durmiendo/ dormido	imperative	—	duerme no duermas	dormí no duermas	duerma	dormamos	dormid no dormáis	duerman
venir/ viniendo/ venido	indicative present	vengo	vienes	venís	viene	venimos	venís	vienen
venir/ viniendo/ venido	indicative perfect past	vine	viniste		vino	vinimos	vinisteis	vinieron
venir/ viniendo/ venido	subjunctive present	venga	vengas	vengás	venga	vengamos	vengáis	vengan
venir/ viniendo/ venido	subjunctive past	viniera	vinieras		viniera	viniéramos	vinierais	vinieran
venir/ viniendo/ venido	imperative	—	ven no vengas	vení no vengas	venga	vengamos	venid no vengáis	vengan

== Diphthong loss ==
Diphthongs in the infinitive may be preserved throughout the conjugation or broken in the forms which are stressed on the stem, depending on whether the i or u in contact with a/e/o take the stress or not. The stressed vowel is marked bold in the examples: cambiar > cambio, but enviar > envío (requiring an acute accent to indicate the resulting hiatus). The Real Academia Española does not consider either behaviour as irregular, but illustrates each with six "regular" models, one for each possible diphthong in the infinitive: anunciar, averiguar, bailar, causar, peinar and adeudar for diphthong-keeping verbs and enviar, actuar, aislar, aunar, descafeinar and rehusar for diphthong-breaking ones. The presence of a silent h does not break a diphthong, so a written accent is needed anyway in rehúso.

All verbs ending in -guar are diphthong-keeping, as well as saciar, desairar, restaurar and reinar. Two diphthongs are kept in desahuciar > desahucio (again the -h- makes no difference), which thus follows both the anunciar and causar models.

Diphthong-breaking verbs include ahincar, aislar, aunar, aullar, maullar, aupar, aliar, vaciar, contrariar, evaluar, habituar, reunir. The verbs criar, fiar, guiar, liar and piar are also diphthong-breaking (crío, guíe), but when the stress falls on the endings the resulting forms are generally considered as monosyllables and thus written without accent: crie, fie, guiais, lieis.... In spite of that, the regular accentuation rules can also be used if they are pronounced as bisyllabic: crié, guiáis....

For the verbs licuar and adecuar both options are valid: adecuo or adecúo.

The ui diphthong in cuidar is kept throughout the conjugation despite the fact of the i getting the stress in forms such as cuido (written without stress mark).

== Other common irregular patterns ==
=== Endings starting with o/a in er/ir verbs ===
In er and ir verbs, the first person singular of the present indicative and the whole present subjunctive are the only forms whose endings start with o/a instead of e/i. These two different phonetic environments made Latin forms evolve differently in many verbs, leading to irregularities. Whenever the first person singular of the present indicative has an irregularity other than diphthongizing, but still ends in -o, the whole present subjunctive shares that same irregularity. For example:

- caber: quepo, quepa... (-caber)
- hacer: hago, haga... (-hacer, g-verb)
- lucir: luzco, luzca... (c-zc, -cir)
- ver: veo, vea...; prever: preveo, prevea... (-ver)

When the first person singular of the present indicative does not end in -o, the present subjunctive is also irregular, but in a different way:

- ir: voy, vaya... (-ir, oy-verb)
- haber: he, haya (-haber)
- saber: sé, sepa... (-saber)
- ser: soy, sea... (-ser, oy-verb)

==== G-verbs ====
Before o (in the first person singular of the indicative present tense) and a (that is, in all persons of the present subjunctive), the so-called g-verbs (sometimes "go-yo verbs", "yo-go verbs", or simply "go verbs") add a medial -g- after l and n (also after s in asir), add -ig- when the root ends in a vowel, or substitute -c- for -g-. This change overrides diphthongization (tener, venir) but combines with vowel-raising (decir). Many of these verbs are also irregular in other ways. For example:

- asir: yo asgo, tú ases... stem: as-
- caer: yo caigo, tú caes... stem: ca-
- decir: yo digo, tú dices... stem: dec/dez- (e-i alternation)
- -facer, as in satisfacer: yo satisfago, tú satisfaces… stem: satisfac-/ satisfaz-
- hacer: yo hago, tú haces... stem: hac/haz-
- oír: yo oigo, tú oyes... stem: o-
- poner: yo pongo, tú pones... stem: pon-
- salir: yo salgo, tú sales... stem: sal- (-salir)
- tener: yo tengo, tú tienes... stem: ten/tien- (e-ie alternation)
- traer: yo traigo, tú traes... stem: tra-
- valer: yo valgo, tú vales... stem: val-
- venir: yo vengo, tú vines... stem: ven- (e-i alternation)
- yacer: yo yago/yazgo, tú yaces... stem: yac/yaz-

==== Zc-verbs ====
This group of verbs—which originated in the Latin inchoative verbs but now includes other verbs as well—substitute -zc- for stem-final -c- before o and a. The group includes nearly all verbs ending in -acer (except hacer and derived verbs), -ecer (except mecer and remecer), -ocer (except cocer and derived verbs), and -ucir. For example:

- nacer: yo nazco, tú naces... (-acer)
- crecer: yo crezco, tú creces... (-ecer)
- conocer: yo conozco, tú conoces... (-ocer)
- ducir: yo duzco, tú duces... (-ucir)
- yacer: yo yazco/yazgo, tú yaces... (yacer)

Yacer may alternatively be conjugated with -zc- (yazco), -g- (yago), or a compromise -zg- (yazgo).

=== Irregular forms in the future, conditional and imperative ===
Some -er and -ir verbs (most g-verbs plus caber, haber, saber, poder and querer) also change their stem in the future and conditional. This involves syncope:

- Just dropping the infinitive e: caber → cabré, haber → habré, poder → podré, querer → querré, saber → sabré
- Dropping the infinitive e/i and padding the resulting *-lr-/*-nr- with an epenthetic -d-: poner → pondré, salir → saldré, tener → tendré, valer → valdré, venir → vendré.
- Dropping the infinitive -ce- or -ec-: decir → diré, hacer → haré
  - contradecir, desdecir, predecir may share this irregularity (prediré...) or, more commonly, use the regular forms (predeciré). For bendecir and maldecir only the regular forms are used (bendeciré...).

Many of these verbs also have shortened tú imperative forms (apocope): decir → di, hacer → haz, salir → sal, poner → pon, tener → ten, venir → ven. However, all verbs derived from decir are regular in this form: bendice, maldice, desdícete, predice, contradice.

=== Anomalous stems in the preterite and derived tenses ===
Some verbs (including most g-verbs and most verbs ending in -ducir) have a somewhat different stem in the preterite. These stems are very old and often are found in Latin as well. The same irregular stem is also found in the imperfect subjunctive (both in -ra and -se forms) and the future subjunctive. These stems are anomalous also because:

- They are stressed in the first and third persons singular, ending in unstressed -e and -o respectively (while in all other cases the preterite is stressed on the suffix).
- The rest of the endings are the usual for -er/-ir verbs, even for the -ar verbs estar and andar.
- In the verbs with -je preterite (decir, traer, and most verbs ending in -ducir) unstressed i is dropped between the j and a vowel: ellos trajeron, yo trajera... This does not happen with regular or vowel-raising -ger/-jer/-gir/-jir verbs (proteger > protegieron, tejer > tejieron, corregir > corrigieron, crujir > crujieron).

Examples:

- andar: yo anduve, tú/vos anduviste(s), él/ella anduvo..., ellos anduvieron; yo anduviera...
- caber: yo cupe, tú/vos cupiste(s), él/ella cupo..., ellos cupieron; yo cupiera...
- decir: yo dije, tú/vos dijiste(s), él/ella dijo, ellos dijeron; yo dijera...
- ducir: yo duje, tú/vos dujiste, él/ella dujo, ellosdujeron; yo dujera
- estar: yo estuve, tú/vos estuviste(s), él/ella estuvo..., ellos estuvieron; yo estuviera...
- haber: yo hube, tú/vos hubiste(s), él/ella hubo..., ellos hubieron; yo hubiera...
- hacer: yo hice, tú/vos hiciste(s), él/ella hizo..., ellos hicieron; yo hiciera...
  - -facer (derivatives of hacer), for example satisfacer: yo satisfice, tú/vos satisficiste(s), él/ella satisfizo…, ellos satisficieron; yo satisficiera…
- poder: yo pude, tú/vos pudiste(s), él/ella pudo..., ellos pudieron; yo pudiera.
- poner: yo puse, tú/vos pusiste(s), él/ella puso..., ellos pusieron; yo pusiera.....
- querer: yo quise, tú/vos quisiste(s), él/ella quiso…, ellos quisieron; yo quisiera…
- saber: yo supe, tú/vos supiste(s), él/ella supo..., ellos supieron; yo supiera...
- tener: yo tuve, tú/vos tuviste(s), él/ella tuvo..., ellos tuvieron; yo tuviera...
- traer: yo traje, tú/vos trajiste(s), él/ella trajo…, ellos trajeron; yo trajera…
- venir: yo vine, tú/vos viniste(s), él/ella vino..., ellos vinieron; yo viniera...

The verb ver in modern Spanish has a regular -er verb preterite (yo vi, tú viste, él vio—note the lack of written accent on monosyllables), but in archaic texts the irregular preterite forms yo vide, él vido, etc. are sometimes seen.

=== Irregular past participles ===
A number of verbs have irregular past participles, sometimes called "strong" because the change is in the root, rather than an ending. This includes verbs which are irregular in many other ways, like poner and decir, but for other verbs this is their only irregularity (such as abrir and romper), while some very irregular verbs (such as ser and ir) have regular past participles. Examples:

- abrir → abierto
- cubrir → cubierto
- decir → dicho
- escribir → escrito/ escripto
- hacer → hecho; satisfacer → satisfecho (and other words ending in -facer)
- morir → muerto
- pudrir → podrido
- poner → puesto
- romper → roto
- resolver → resuelto (and other words ending in -solver)
- ver → visto
- volver → vuelto

Most of these verbs have derivatives with the same irregularity. For example, alongside volver → vuelto and poner → puesto, there are devolver → devuelto and componer → compuesto; alongside decir → dicho there is predecir → predicho (but note bendecir → bendecido, maldecir → maldecido are regular, though they also have the adjectival forms bendito and maldito). Solver is obsolete, but its derivatives absolver and resolver (absuelto, resuelto) are in common use. Likewise with premir and its derivatives comprimir, deprimir, imprimir, exprimir, oprimir, reprimir, and suprimir. The alternative form of escrito, escripto, is used in Argentina, Paraguay, and Uruguay; likewise with derivates of escribir, such as describir.

There are verbs that have both a regular and an irregular past participle. Both forms may be used when conjugating the compound tenses and the passive voice with the auxiliary verbs haber and ser, but the irregular form is generally the only one used as an adjective:

- elegir → he elegido or he elecho
- freír → he freído or he frito; but papas fritas "french fries".
- imprimir → he imprimido or he impreso (and other words ending in -primir)
- prender → he prendido or he preso
- proveer → he proveído or he provisto, but una despensa bien provista is far more usual than una despensa bien proveída.

A number of other "strong" past participles, such as ducho, electo, pinto, among others are obsolete for general use, but are occasionally used in Spain (and to a much lesser extent in Spanish America) among educated, style-conscious writers, or in linguistic archaisms such as proverbs (refranes). Otherwise, they are obsolete or solely used as adjectives.

== Wholly irregular verbs ==
The verbs ir "to go" and ser "to be [in essence]" both exhibit irregularities in the present, imperfect and preterite forms. Together with ver "to see", they are the only three verbs with irregular indicative imperfect past tenses. These verbs are highly irregular based on being single-syllable stems, and suppleting several tenses. Similarly, dar "to give" and estar "to be [in a state]" (whose stem was originally st-) also come from verbs with one syllable in the stem but they do not supplete any tenses. A table of their conjugations is shown below:

Wholly irregular verb inflection
Verb inflection	Indicative				Subjunctive		Imperative		Conditional
Verb inflection	Present	Past		Future	Present	Past	Affirmative	Negative	Conditional
Verb inflection	Present	Imperfect	Preterite	Future	Present	Past	Affirmative	Negative	Conditional
dar/ dando/ dado "to give/ giving/ given"
yo	doy	daba	di	daré	dé	diera	—		daría
tú	das	dabas	diste	darás	des	dieras	da	no des	darías
vos	das	dabas	diste	darás	des	dieras	da	no des	darías
él/ ella; usted	da	daba	dio	dará	dé	diera	dé	no dé	daría
nosotr(os/as)	damos	dábamos	dimos	daremos	demos	diéramos	demos	no demos	daríamos
vosotr(os/as)	dais	dabais	disteis	daráis	deis	dierais	dad	no deis	daríais
ell(os/as); ustedes	dan	daban	dieron	darán	den	dieran	den	no den	darían
estar/ estando/ estado "to be/ being/ been [in a state]"
yo	estoy	estaba	estuvo	estaré	esté	estuviera	—		estaría
tú	estás	estabas	estuviste	estarás	estés	estuvieras	está	no estés	estarías
vos	estás	estabas	estuviste	estarás	estés	estuvieras	está	no estés	estarías
él/ ella; usted	está	estaba	estuve	estará	esté	estuvera	esté	no esté	estaría
nosotr(os/as)	estamos	estábamos	estuvimos	estaremos	estemos	estuviéramos	estemos	no estemos	estaríamos
vosotr(os/as)	estáis	estabais	estuvisteis	estaráis	estéis	estuvieráis	ested	no estéis	estaríais
ell(os/as); ustedes	están	estaban	estuvieron	estarán	estén	estuvieran	estén	no estén	estarían
ir/ yendo/ ido "to go/ going/ gone"
yo	voy	iba	fui	iré	vaya	fuera	—		iría
tú	vas	ibas	fuiste	irás	vayas	fueras	ve	no vayas	irías
vos	vas	ibas	fuiste	irás	vayás	fueras	andá	no vayas	irías
él/ ella; usted	va	iba	fue	irá	vaya	fuera	vaya	no vaya	iría
nosotr(os/as)	vamos	íbamos	fuimos	iremos	vayamos	fuéramos	vamos	no vayamos	iríamos
vosotr(os/as)	vais	ibais	fuisteis	iréis	vayáis	fuerais	id	no vayáis	iríaís
ell(os/as); ustedes	van	iban	fueron	irán	vayan	fueran	vayan	no	irían
ser/ siendo/ sido "to be/ being/ been [in essence]"
yo	soy	era	fui	seré	sea	fuera	—		sería
tú	eres	eras	fuiste	serás	seas	fueras	sé	no seas	serías
vos	sos	eras	fuiste	serás	seás	fueras	sé	no seas	serías
él/ ella; usted	es	era	fue	será	sea	fuera	sea	no sea	sería
nosotr(os/as)	somos	éramos	fuimos	seremos	seamos	fuéramos	seamos	no seamos	seríamos
vosotr(os/as)	sois	erais	fuisteis	seráis	seáis	fuerais	sed	no seáis	seríaís
ell(os/as); ustedes	son	eran	fueron	serán	sean	fueran	sean	no sean	serían
ver/ viendo/ visto "to see/ seeing/ seen"
yo	veo	veía	vi	veré	vea	viera	—		vería
tú	ves	veías	viste	verás	veas	vieras	ve	no veas	verías
vos	ves	veías	viste	verás	veás	vieras	ve	no veas	verías
él/ ella; usted	ve	veía	vio	verá	vea	viera	vea	no vea	vería
nosotr(os/as)	vemos	veíamos	vimos	veremos	veamos	viéramos	veamos	no veamos	veríamos
vosotr(os/as)	veis	veíais	visteis	veráis	veáis	vieráis	ved	no veáis	veríais
ell(os/as); ustedes	ven	veían	vieron	verán	vean	vieran	vean	no vean	verían

Whenever the stem of the indicative perfect past tense is irregular, the subjunctive past tense (-ra or -se) and the obsolescent subjunctive future tense (-re) share the same irregularity but with different infixes. The subjunctive past -ra forms are used in the table above, as the -se forms are less predominant. Some forms of dar and estar take an accent when marking stress would be redundant to distinguish them from unrelated words; such as dé contrasting with the prepositon de. In New Mexican Spanish, soy may be replaced by seigo.

== See also ==
- Spanish conjugation

== Notes ==
- ¹ Vulgar or profane.
- ² Vulgar or profane depending on context.
