= Spanish verbs =

Verbs in the Spanish language

Spanish verbs form one of the more complex areas of Spanish grammar. Spanish is a relatively synthetic language with a moderate to high degree of inflection, which shows up mostly in Spanish conjugation.

As is typical of verbs in virtually all languages, Spanish verbs express an action or a state of being of a given subject, and like verbs in most Indo-European languages, Spanish verbs undergo inflection according to the following categories:

- Tense: past, present, or future
- Number: singular or plural
- Person: first, second or third
- T–V distinction: familiar or formal
- Mood: indicative, subjunctive, or imperative
- Aspect: perfective or imperfective (distinguished only in the past tenses of the indicative mood as preterite and imperfect)
- Voice: active or passive

The modern Spanish verb paradigm (conjugation) has 16 distinct complete (Note: "Complete" here means having forms for all three grammatical persons in both singular and plural.) forms (tenses), i.e. sets of forms for each combination of tense, mood and aspect, plus one incomplete (Note: "Incomplete", with reference to the imperative, means having forms only for the second persons and the first-person plural, and lacking third-person forms.) tense (the imperative), as well as three non-temporal forms (the infinitive, gerund, and past participle). Two of the tenses, namely both subjunctive futures, are now obsolete for most practical purposes.

The 16 "regular" forms (tenses) include 8 simple tenses and 8 compound tenses. The compound tenses are formed with the auxiliary verb haber plus the past participle. Verbs can be used in other forms, such as the present progressive, but in grammar treatises they are not usually considered a part of the paradigm but rather periphrastic verbal constructions.

== Verbal inflection ==
Spanish verbs are inflected to convey mood, tense, voice, and aspect, and to agree with person and number.

=== Person and number ===
Spanish verbs are conjugated in three persons, each having a singular and a plural form. In some varieties of Spanish, such as that of the Río de la Plata Region, a special form of the second person is used.

Spanish is a pro-drop language, meaning that subject pronouns are often omitted.

==== First person ====
The grammatical first person refers to the speaker ("I"). The first person plural refers to the speaker together with at least one other person.

- (Yo) soy: "I am"
- (Nosotros/Nosotras) somos: "We are"; the feminine form nosotras is used only when referring to a group that is composed entirely of females; otherwise, nosotros is used.

==== Second person ====
The grammatical second person refers to the addressee, the receiver of the communication ("you"). Spanish has different pronouns (and verb forms) for "you," depending on the relationship, familiar or formal, between speaker and addressee.

Singular forms

- (Tú) eres: "You are"; familiar singular; used when addressing someone who is of close affinity (a member of the family, a close friend, a child, a pet). It is also the form used to address a deity.
- (Vos) sos: "You are"; familiar singular; generally used in the same way as tú. Its use is restricted to some areas of Hispanic America. In some areas both tú and vos are used, formality levels and usage vary by country.
- (Usted) es: "You are"; formal singular; used when addressing a person respectfully, someone older, someone not known to the speaker, or someone of some social distance. Although it is a second-person pronoun, it uses third-person verb forms (and object pronouns and possessives) because it developed as a contraction of vuestra merced (literally, "your mercy" or "your grace").

Plural forms

- (Vosotros/Vosotras) sois: "You (all) are"; familiar plural; used when addressing people who are of close affinity (members of the family, friends, children, pets). The feminine form vosotras is used only when addressing a group composed entirely of females; otherwise, vosotros is used. Used primarily in Spain but is also used in Equatorial Guinea and the Philippines, though it may appear in old, formal texts from other countries, such as the first initial line of the Argentine national anthem ("Oíd, mortales, el grito sagrado").
- (Ustedes) son: "You (all) are"; formal plural where vosotros is used; both familiar and formal plural elsewhere. Where it is strictly formal, used when addressing people respectfully or addressing people of some social distance. Like usted, it uses third-person verb forms, for the same reasons.

==== Third person ====
The grammatical third person refers to a person or thing other than the speaker or the addressee.

Singular forms

- (Él) es: "He/it is"; used for a male person or a thing of masculine (grammatical) gender.
- (Ella) es: "She/it is"; used for a female person or a thing of feminine (grammatical) gender.
- (Ello) es: "It is"; used to refer to neuter nouns such as facts, ideas, situations, and sets of things; rarely used as an explicit subject.

Plural forms

- (Ellos) son: "They are"; used for a group of people or things that includes at least one person or thing of masculine (grammatical) gender.
- (Ellas) son: "They are"; used for a group of people or things that are all of feminine (grammatical) gender.

=== Mood ===
Grammatical mood is one of a set of distinctive forms that are used to signal modality. In Spanish, every verb has forms in three moods. In older classifications there was a fourth mood, the conditional, that included the two conditional tenses (simple and compound), but nowadays those tenses are included in the indicative mood.

- Indicative mood: The indicative mood, or evidential mood, is used for factual statements and positive beliefs. The Spanish conditional, although semantically expressing the dependency of one action or proposition on another, is generally considered indicative in mood, because, syntactically, it can appear in an independent clause.
- Subjunctive mood: The subjunctive mood expresses an imagined, possible or desired action in the past, present, or future.
- Imperative mood: The imperative mood expresses direct commands, requests, and prohibitions. In Spanish, using the imperative mood may sound blunt or even rude in some social settings, so it should be used with care.

=== Tense ===
The tense of a verb indicates the time when the action occurs. It may be in the past, present, or future.

=== Impersonal or non-finite forms of the verb ===
Non-finite verb forms refer to an action or state without indicating the time or person, and it is not conjugated for subject. Spanish has three non-finite forms: the infinitive, the gerund, and the past participle.

==== Infinitive ====
The infinitive is generally the form found in dictionaries. It corresponds to the English "base-form" or "dictionary form" and is usually indicated in English by "to _____" ("to sing," "to write," etc.). The ending of the infinitive is the basis of the names given in English to the three classes of Spanish verbs:

- "-ar" verbs (primera conjugación ["first conjugation"])

Examples: hablar ("to speak"); cantar ("to sing"); bailar ("to dance")

- "-er" verbs (segunda conjugación ["second conjugation"])

Examples: beber ("to drink"); leer ("to read"); comprender ("to understand")

- "-ir" verbs (tercera conjugación ["third conjugation"])

Examples: vivir ("to live"); sentir ("to feel"); escribir ("to write")

==== Gerund ====
Although in English grammar the gerund refers to the -ing form of the verb used as a noun, in Spanish the term refers to a verb form that behaves more like an adverb. It is created by adding the following endings to the stem of the verb (i.e. the infinitive without the last two letters):

- -ar verbs: -ando

Examples: hablando ("speaking"); cantando ("singing"); bailando ("dancing")

- -er verbs: -iendo

Examples: bebiendo ("drinking"); leyendo (with spelling change; "reading"); comprendiendo ("understanding")

- -ir verbs: -iendo

Examples: viviendo ("living"); sintiendo (with stem-vowel change; "feeling"); escribiendo ("writing")

Certain verbs have irregular gerund forms:

- Most -ir verbs undergo a predictable stem-vowel change: sentir → sintiendo, medir → midiendo, repetir → repitiendo, dormir → durmiendo, morir → muriendo. One -er verb also belongs to this group: poder → pudiendo.
- In verbs whose stem ends in a vowel, the spelling of the -iendo ending is changed to -yendo: oír → oyendo, caer → cayendo, leer → leyendo, traer → trayendo, construir → construyendo, huir → huyendo. The "stemless" verb ir belongs to this group, with yendo.
- For -er and -ir verbs whose stem ends in ⟨ñ⟩ or ⟨ll⟩, the -iendo ending is reduced to -endo: tañer → tañendo, bullir → bullendo.

The gerund has a variety of uses and can mean (with haciendo, for example) "doing/while doing/by doing/because of one's doing/through doing" and so on. It is also used to form progressive constructions, such as estoy haciendo ("I am doing"). The gerund cannot be used as an adjective and generally has no corresponding adjectival forms. The now-mostly archaic present participle, which ended in -ante or -iente and formerly filled this function, in some cases survives as such an adjective (e.g. durmiente ("sleeping"), interesante ("interesting")), but they are limited, and in cases where it does not, other constructions must be used to express the same ideas: where in English one would say "the crying baby", one would say in Spanish el bebé que llora ("the baby who's crying"; llorante is archaic).

==== Past participle ====
The past participle corresponds to the English -en or -ed form of the verb. It is created by adding the following endings to the verb stem:

- -ar verbs: -ado

Examples: hablado ("spoken"); cantado ("sung"); bailado ("danced")

- -er verbs: -ido

Examples: bebido ("drunk"); leído (requires accent mark; "read"); comprendido ("understood")

- -ir verbs,: -ido

Examples: vivido ("lived"); sentido ("felt"); hervido ("boiled")

The past participle, ending invariably in -o, is used following the auxiliary verb haber to form the compound or perfect: (Yo) he hablado ("I have spoken"); (Ellos) habían hablado ("They had spoken"); etc.

When the past participle is used as an adjective, it inflects for both gender and number – for example, una lengua hablada en España ("a language spoken in Spain").

=== Voice ===
In grammar, the voice of a verb describes the relationship between the action (or state) that the verb expresses and the participants identified by its arguments (subject, object, etc.). When the subject is the agent or doer of the action, the verb is in the active voice. When the subject is the patient, target, or undergoer of the action, it is said to be in the passive voice.

=== Verbal aspect ===
Verbal aspect marks whether an action is completed (perfect), a completed whole (perfective), or not yet completed (imperfective).

- Perfect: In Spanish, verbs that are conjugated with haber ("to have [done something]") are in the perfect aspect.
- Perfective: In Spanish, verbs in the preterite are in the perfective aspect.
- Imperfective: In Spanish, the present, imperfect, and future tenses are in the imperfective aspect.

== Conjugation ==
In this page the table will list suffixes and patterns for most verbs, with the highly irregular verbs dar ("to give"), estar ("to be (in a state"), ir ("to go"), ser ("to be (in essence)"), ver ("to see"), always given their own rows. Other relevant irregular verbs will also be given own rows for relevant tenses. The "V" used to mark patterns in verb suffixes represents the last vowel in the infinitive form. Note that many verb suffixes add or drop an acute accent on suffixes to mark stress, or change vowels entirely. For example, the present indicative tú form of partir ("to leave") is "partes", but the present indicative vos form is "partís".

=== The indicative ===
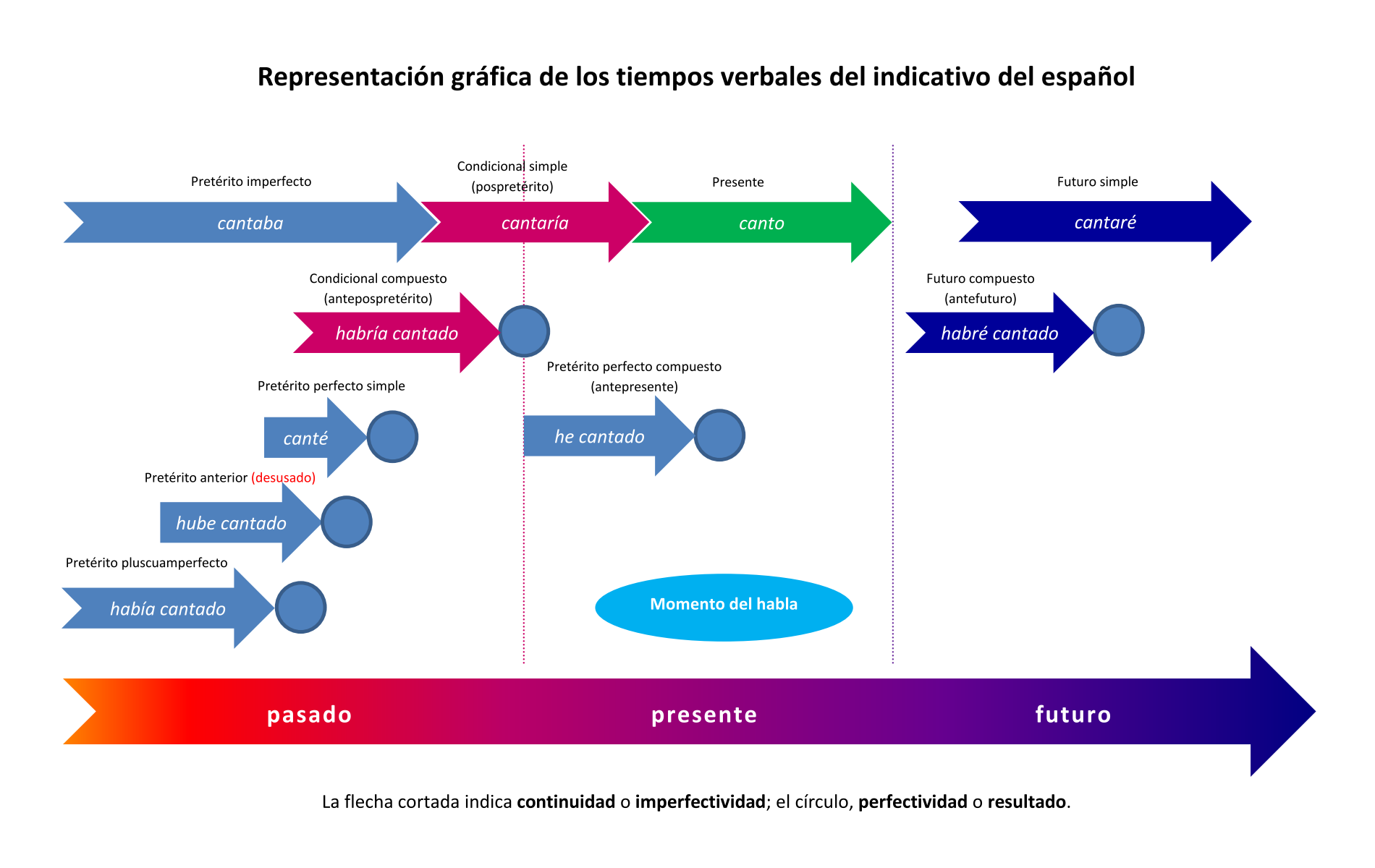
Graphic representation of Spanish verbal tenses of the indicative

The indicative mood has five simple tenses, each of which has a corresponding perfect form. In older classifications, the conditional tenses were considered part of an independent conditional mood, but now are grouped with the indicative. Continuous forms (such as estoy hablando) are usually not considered part of the verbal paradigm, though they often appear in books addressed to English speakers who are learning Spanish. Modern grammatical studies count only the simple forms as tenses, and the other forms as products of tenses and aspects.

==== Simple tenses (tiempos simples) ====
The simple tenses are the forms of the verb without the use of a modal or helping verb. The following are the simple tenses and their uses:

===== Present (presente) =====
The indicative present tense is used similarly to English. Its endings are the following:

Indicative present tense endings
| Verb class | yo | tú | vos | él/ella; usted | nosotr(os/as) | vosotr(os/as) | ell(os/as); ustedes |
Regular verbs
| general | -o | -Vs | -V́s | -V | -Vmos | -V́is | -Vn |
| -ar verbs | -o | -as | -ás | -a | -amos | -áis | -an |
| -er verbs | -o | -es | -és | -e | -emos | -éis | -en |
| -ir verbs | -o | -es | -ís | -e | -imos | -ís | -en |
Irregular verbs
| asir "to grab (onto)" | asgo | ases | asís | ase | asemos | asís | asen |
| caber "to fit" | quepo | cabes | cabés | cabe | cabemos | cabéis | caben |
| caer "to fall" | caigo | caes | caés | cae | caemos | caéis | caen |
| conocer "to know (people)" | conozco | conoces | conocés | conoce | conocemos | conocéis | conocen |
| dar "to give" | doy | das | | da | damos | dais | dan |
| decir "to speak, say, tell" | digo | dices | decís | dice | decimos | decís | dicen |
| estar "to be (state)" | estoy | estás | | está | estamos | estáis | están |
| -facer (suffix, "-fy") | -fago | -faces | -facés | -face | -facemos | -facéis | -facen |
| haber "to have (auxiliary verb)" | he | has | | ha | hemos | habéis | han |
| hacer "to do; to make" | hago | haces | hacés | hace | hacemos | hacéis | hacen |
| ir "to go" | voy | vas | | va | vamos | vais | van |
| oír "to hear" | oigo | oyes | oís | oye | oyemos | oís | oyen |
| poner "to put, place" | pongo | pones | ponés | pone | ponemos | ponéis | ponen |
| saber "to know (things); to taste" | sé, sepo* | sabes | sabés | sabe | sabemos | sabéis | saben |
| ser "to be (essence)" | soy | eres | sos | es | somos | sois | son |
| tener "to have (regular verb)" | tengo | tienes | tenés | tiene | tenemos | tenéis | tienen |
| traer "to bring" | traigo | traes | traés | trae | traemos | traéis | traen |
| valer "to be worth; to be well" | valgo | vales | valés | vale | valemos | valéis | valen |
| ver "to see" | veo | ves | | ve | vemos | veis | ven |
| venir "to come" | vengo | vienes | venís | viene | venimos | venís | vienen |
| yacer "to lie down" | yazgo | yaces | yacés | yace | yacemos | yacéis | yacen |

Many verbs have an irregular first person singular, but inflect regularly otherwise:

- A few very common verbs use -go (or -igo if the stem ends in a vowel) instead of -o; these are called g verbs and are all listed here.
- Verbs ending in -acer (besides hacer and -facer), -ecer (besides mecer "to rock, shake"), -ocer (besides cocer "to cook"), and -ucir always use -zco instead of -o; these are called zc verbs. For brevity, only conocer is shown as an example.
- Caber and saber have irregular first person singulars that do not belong to any pattern.
- Saber also has the first person singular form sepo when it means "to taste". While this is common, it is officially proscribed by the Royal Spanish Academy.
- Yacer can be either a g-verb, zc-verb, or a combination of the two shown above.

Uses

The present is used to indicate the following:

- Punctual present: This expresses an action that is being done at the very moment.

María habla con Juan por teléfono = "María is speaking with Juan on the telephone"

- Continuous present or durative present: This expresses an action that is being done from the moment of speaking, extending into the past and future.

Yo vivo en Madrid = "I live in Madrid"
El museo exhibe las obras de Miró = "The museum is exhibiting works by Miró"

- Habitual present: This expresses an action that is regularly and habitually being done.

María va al campo todos los sábados = "María goes to the countryside every Saturday"

- Gnomic present: This expresses general truths that are not bounded by time.

Dos más dos son cuatro = "Two plus two equals four"
Los planetas giran alrededor del sol = "The planets revolve around the sun"

- Historical present: This expresses an action that happened in the past but is accepted as historical fact.

Fernando Magallanes descubre las Filipinas el 15 de marzo de 1521 = "Ferdinand Magellan discovers the Philippines on March 15th, 1521"

- An immediate future (near future): This expresses an action that will be done in the very near future with a high degree of certainty.

Este junio, viajo a España = "This June, I am travelling to Spain"

- Imperative value: In some areas of Spain and Hispanic America, the present can be used (with an exclamatory tone) with an imperative value.

¡Ahora te vas y pides disculpas al señor Ruiz! = "Now go and apologize to Mr. Ruiz!"

===== Imperfect [past] (pretérito imperfecto) =====
The past tense in Spanish takes different endings depending on whether the verb describes a finished action. The imperfect past tense is formed with the endings shown below. Like other imperfect aspects, it usually refers to actions that have not been finished. Its name is usually shortened to the imperfect, as the "past tense" usually refers to the perfect past. -Er and -ir verbs have the same suffixes, and so do all first and third person singular forms. There are no distinct vos forms.

Indicative imperfect past tense endings
| Verb class | yo; él/ella; usted | tú/ vos | nosotr(os/as) | vosotr(os/as) | ell(os/as); ustedes |
Regular verbs
| general | -Vba | -Vbas | -V́bamos | -Vbais | -Vban |
| -ar verbs | -aba | -abas | -ábamos | -abais | -aban |
| -er verbs | -ía | -ías | -íamos | -íais | -ían |
| -ir verbs | -ía | -ías | -íamos | -íais | -ían |
Irregular verbs
| dar (regular) | daba | dabas | dábamos | dabais | daban |
| estar (regular) | estaba | estabas | estábamos | estabais | estaban |
| ir | iba | ibas | íbamos | ibais | iban |
| ser | era | eras | éramos | erais | eran |
| ver | veía | veías | veíamos | veíais | veían |

Uses

The imperfect is used to express the following:

- Habitual action in the past: This use expresses an action done habitually in an indefinite past. It does not focus on when the action ended.

Cuando era pequeño, hablaba español con mi abuela = "When I was young, I spoke Spanish with my grandmother"

- An action interrupted by another action: This expresses an action that was in progress when another action took place.

Tomábamos la cena cuando entró Eduardo = "We were having dinner when Eduardo came in"

- General description of the past: This expresses a past setting, as, for example, the background for a narrative.

Todo estaba tranquilo esa noche. Juan Eduardo miraba el partido de fútbol con su amigo Alejandro. Comían unas porciones de pizza. = "Everything was calm that night. Juan Eduardo was watching the football match with his friend Alejandro. They were eating some slices of pizza."

===== Preterite/ perfect past (pretérito perfecto simple or pretérito indefinido) =====
The perfect past tense is used with actions that have been completed or express a general statement. It is typically called the preterite for short, and in imitation of the native Spanish term. -Er verbs and -ir verbs share endings, while ser and ir merge completely in this tense. There are no distinct vos forms for any verb. Many verbs change their stem in this tense.

Indicative perfect past tense endings
| Verb class | yo | tú/ vos | él/ella; usted | nosotr(os/as) | vosotr(os/as) | ell(os/as); ustedes |
Regular verbs
| general | -V́e | -Vste | -Vó | -Vmos | -Vsteis | -Vron |
| -ar verbs | -é | -aste | -ó | -amos | -asteis | -aron |
| -er verbs | -í | -iste | -ió | -imos | -isteis | -ieron |
| -ir verbs | -í | -iste | -ió | -imos | -isteis | -ieron |
Irregular verbs
| andar "to go, walk" | anduve | anduviste | anduvo | anduvimos | anduvisteis | anduvieron |
| caber | cupe | cupiste | cupo | cupimos | cupisteis | cupieron |
| dar | di | diste | dio | dimos | disteis | dieron |
| decir | dije | dijiste | dijo | dijimos | dijisteis | dijeron |
| -ducir (Note: traducir, retraducir, introducir, producir, coproducir, reducir, reproducir, conducir, reconducir, deducir, seducir, abducir, aducir, educir, inducir.) | -duje | -dujiste | -dujo | -dujimos | -dujisteis | -dujeron |
| estar | estuve | estuviste | estuvo | estuvimos | estuvisteis | estuvieron |
| -facer | -fice | -ficiste | -fizo | -ficimos | -ficisteis | -ficieron |
| haber | hube | hubiste | hubo | hubimos | hubisteis | hubieron |
| hacer | hice | hiciste | hizo | hicimos | hicisteis | hicieron |
| ir/ ser | fui | fuiste | fue | fuimos | fuisteis | fueron |
| poder "can, to be able to" | pude | pudiste | pudo | pudimos | pudisteis | pudieron |
| poner | puse | pusiste | puso | pusimos | pusisteis | pusieron |
| querer "to want" | quise | quisiste | quiso | quisimos | quisisteis | quisieron |
| saber | supe | supiste | supo | supimos | supisteis | supieron |
| tener | tuve | tuviste | tuvo | tuvimos | tuvisteis | tuvieron |
| traer | traje | trajiste | trajo | trajimos | trajisteis | trajeron |
| venir | vine | viniste | vino | vinimos | vinisteis | vinieron |
| ver (regular) | vi | viste | vio | vimos | visteis | vieron |

Uses

The preterite is used to express the following:

- An action that was done in the past: This use expresses an action that is viewed as a completed event. It is often accompanied by adverbial expressions of time, such as ayer, anteayer, or la semana pasada.

Ayer, encontré la flor que tú me diste = "Yesterday, I found the flower that you gave me"

- An action that interrupts another action: This expresses an event that happened (and was completed) while another action was taking place.

Tomábamos la cena cuando entró Eduardo = "We were having dinner when Eduardo came in"

- A general truth: This expresses a past relationship that is viewed as finished.

Las Filipinas fueron parte del Imperio Español = "The Philippines were part of the Spanish Empire"

===== Future (futuro simple or futuro imperfecto) =====
The future tense for all verbs adds suffixes directly to the infinitive. Some verbs change the stem in this tense, but is otherwise more uniform than other tenses. The highly irregular verbs dar, estar, ir, ser, and ver are all regular in this tense. Like the indicative perfect past, there are no distinct vos forms.

Indicative future tense
| Verb class | yo | tú/ vos | él/ella; usted | nosotr(os/as) | vosotr(os/as) | ell(os/as); ustedes |
Regular verbs
| general | -Vré | -Vrás | -Vrá | -Vremos | -Vréis | -Vrán |
| -ar verbs | -aré | -arás | -ará | -aremos | -aréis | -arán |
| -er verbs | -eré | -erás | -erá | -eremos | -eréis | -erán |
| -ir verbs | -iré | -irás | -irá | -iremos | -iréis | -irán |
Irregular verbs
| dar (regular) | daré | darás | dará | daremos | daréis | darán |
| decir | diré | dirás | dirá | diremos | diréis | dirán |
| estar (regular) | estaré | estarás | estará | estaremos | estaréis | estarán |
| -facer | -faré | -farás | -fará | -faremos | -faréis | -farán |
| haber | habré | habrás | habrá | habremos | habréis | habrán |
| hacer | haré | harás | hará | haremos | haréis | harán |
| ir (regular) | iré | irás | irá | iremos | iréis | irán |
| poder | podré | podrás | podrá | podremos | podréis | podrán |
| poner | pondré | pondrás | pondrá | pondremos | pondréis | pondrán |
| querer | querré | querrás | querrá | querremos | querréis | querrán |
| saber | sabré | sabrás | sabrá | sabremos | sabréis | sabrán |
| salir | saldré | saldrás | saldrá | saldremos | saldréis | saldrán |
| ser (regular) | seré | serás | será | seremos | seréis | serán |
| tener | tendré | tendrás | tendrá | tendremos | tendréis | tendrán |
| valer | valdré | valdrás | valdrá | valdremos | valdréis | valdrán |
| venir | vendré | vendrás | vendrá | vendremos | vendréis | vendrán |
| ver (regular) | veré | verás | verá | veremos | veréis | verán |

Uses

The future is used to express the following:

- A future action: This expresses an action that will be done in the future.

El año próximo, visitaré Buenos Aires = "Next year, I shall/will visit Buenos Aires"

- Uncertainty or probability: This expresses inference, rather than direct knowledge.

¿Quién estará tocando a la puerta? — Será Fabio. = "Who (do you suppose) is knocking at the door? — It must be Fabio". (An analogous use of the future tense occurs in English, as in "That'll be Fabio".)

- Command, prohibition, or obligation:

No llevarás a ese hombre a mi casa = "Do not bring that man to my house" or, more accurately, "You will not bring that man to my house"; this form is also used to assert a command, prohibition, or obligation in English. The biblical Ten Commandments are commonly expressed in the future tense in Spanish (e.g. No matarás).

- Courtesy:

¿Te importará encender la televisión? = "Would you mind turning on the television?"

Another common way to represent future time is with a present indicative conjugation of ir, followed by a, followed by an infinitive verb: Voy a viajar a Bolivia en el verano ("I'm going to travel to Bolivia in the summer"). The difference between the use of the two forms varies according to dialect, but the "ir a + [infinitive]" construction tends to be more colloquial. Also, this construction—unlike the future simple form—is not used in the "probability" sense to express conjecture.

===== Conditional (condicional simple or pospretérito) =====
The conditional mood describes potential events without reference to time or completion. It is broadly equivalent to English "would". As with the future, the conditional uses the entire infinitive as the stem. Also like the future tense, any irregular forms are in the stem not the endings, which means the highly irregular verbs dar, estar, ir, ser, and ver are regular in this tense. Generally, the infinitive is added to the -er/-ir imperfect past endings regardless of the verb class. There are again no distinct vos forms for any verb.

Conditional mood
| Verb class | yo; él/ella; usted | tú/ vos | nosotr(os/as) | vosotr(os/as) | ell(os/as); ustedes |
Regular verbs
| general | -Vría | -Vrías | -Vríamos | -Vríais | -Vrían |
| -ar verbs | -aría | -arías | -aríamos | -aríais | -arían |
| -er verbs | -ería | -erías | -eríamos | -eríais | -erían |
| -ir verbs | -iría | -irías | -iríamos | -iríais | -irían |
Irregular verbs
| dar (regular) | daría | darías | daríamos | daríais | darían |
| decir | diría | dirías | diríamos | diríais | dirían |
| estar (regular) | estaría | estarías | estaríamos | estaríais | estarían |
| -facer | -faría | -farías | -faríamos | -faríais | -farían |
| haber | habría | habrías | habríamos | habríais | habrían |
| hacer | haría | harías | haríamos | haríais | harían |
| ir (regular) | iría | irías | iríamos | iríais | irían |
| poder | podría | podrías | podríamos | podríais | podrían |
| poner | pondría | pondrías | pondríamos | pondríais | pondrían |
| querer | querría | querrías | querríamos | querríais | querrían |
| saber | sabría | sabrías | sabríamos | sabríais | sabrían |
| salir | saldría | saldrías | saldríamos | saldríais | saldrían |
| ser (regular) | sería | serías | seríamos | seríais | serían |
| tener | tendría | tendrías | tendríamos | tendríais | tendrían |
| valer | valdría | valdrías | valdríamos | valdríais | valdrían |
| venir | vendría | vendrías | vendríamos | vendríais | vendrían |
| ver (regular) | vería | verías | veríamos | veríais | verían |

Uses

The conditional is used to express the following:

- Courtesy: Using this mood softens a request, making it more polite.

Señor, ¿podría darme una copa de vino? = "Sir, could you give me a glass of wine?"

- Polite expression of a desire (using querer):

Querría ver la película esta semana = "I would like to see the film this week"

- In a then clause whose realization depends on a hypothetical if clause:

Si yo fuera rico, viajaría a Sudamérica = "If I were rich, I would travel to South America"

- Speculation about past events (the speaker's knowledge is indirect, unconfirmed, or approximating):

¿Cuántas personas asistieron a la inauguración del Presidente? — No lo sé; habría unas 5.000 = "How many people attended the President's inauguration? — I would not know; there must have been about 5,000")

- A future action in relation to the past: This expresses future action that was imagined in the past.

Cuando era pequeño, pensaba que me gustaría ser médico = "When I was young, I thought that I would like to be a doctor"

- A suggestion:

Yo que tú, lo olvidaría completamente = "If I were you, I would forget him completely"

==== Compound tenses (tiempos compuestos) ====
All the compound tenses are formed with haber followed by the past participle of the main verb. Haber changes its form for person, number, and the like, while the past participle remains invariable, ending with -o regardless of the number or gender of the subject.

===== Present perfect (pretérito perfecto compuesto) =====
In the present perfect, the present indicative of haber is used as an auxiliary, and it is followed by the past participle of the main verb. In most of Spanish America, this tense has virtually the same use as the English present perfect:

- Te he dicho mi opinión = "I have told you my opinion"

In most of Spain the tense has an additional use—to express a past action or event that is contained in a still-ongoing period of time or that has effects in the present:

- Este mes ha llovido mucho, pero hoy hace buen día = "It has rained a lot this month, but today is a fine day"

Occasionally tener and llevar are used with the past participle of a transitive verb for an effect that is similar to the present perfect. In these cases the participle usually agrees in gender and number with the direct object:

- Ya tengo compradas las entradas para nosotros. = "I have already bought the tickets for us" (Speaking of the effects in the present)
- Llevo grabados tres discos = "I have recorded three records"

===== Past perfect or pluperfect (pretérito pluscuamperfecto) =====
In this tense, the imperfect form of haber is used as a modal, and it is followed by the past participle of the main verb:

- (yo) había + past participle
- (tú) habías + past participle
- (él/ella/ello/usted) había + past participle
- (nosotros/nosotras) habíamos + past participle
- (vosotros/vosotras) habíais + past participle
- (ellos/ellas/ustedes) habían + past participle

Uses

The past perfect is used to express the following:

- A past action that occurred prior to another past action:

Yo había esperado tres horas cuando él llegó = "I had waited for three hours when he arrived"

===== Past anterior (pretérito anterior) =====
The past anterior combines the preterite form of haber with the past participle of the main verb. It is very rare in spoken Spanish, but it is sometimes used in formal written language, where it is almost entirely limited to subordinate (temporal, adverbial) clauses. Thus, it is usually introduced by temporal conjunctions such as cuando, apenas, or en cuanto. It is used to express an action that ended immediately before another past action:

- (yo) hube + past participle
- (tú) hubiste + past participle
- (él/ella/ello/usted) hubo + past participle
- (nosotros/nosotras) hubimos + past participle
- (vosotros/vosotras) hubisteis + past participle
- (ellos/ellas/ustedes) hubieron + past participle

For example:

- Cuando hubieron llegado todos, empezó la ceremonia = "When everyone had arrived, the ceremony began"
- Apenas María hubo terminado la canción, su padre entró = "As soon as Maria had finished the song, her father came in"

It is often replaced by either the preterite or the pluperfect, with the same meaning:

- Apenas María terminó la canción, su padre entró
- Apenas María había terminado la canción, su padre entró

===== Future perfect (futuro compuesto) =====
The future perfect is formed with the future indicative of haber followed by the past participle of the main verb:

- (yo) habré + past participle
- (tú) habrás + past participle
- (él/ella/ello/usted) habrá + past participle
- (nosotros/nosotras) habremos + past participle
- (vosotros/vosotras) habréis + past participle
- (ellos/ellas/ustedes) habrán + past participle

For example:

- Habré hablado = "I shall/will have spoken"

It is used to indicate a future action that will be finished right before another action:

- Cuando yo llegue a la fiesta, ya se habrán marchado todos = "When I get to the party, everyone will already have left"

===== Conditional perfect or compound conditional (condicional compuesto or antepospretérito) =====
The conditional perfect refers to a hypothetical past action.

For example:

- Yo habría hablado si me hubieran/hubiesen dado la oportunidad = "I would have spoken if they had given me the opportunity to"

=== Imperative ===
The imperative mood has only three unique forms, used for the pronouns tú, vos, and vosotros in affirmative requests. The subjunctive present supplements the imperative in all other cases, and there are no first person singular or true third person forms. Spanish often inflects affirmative and negative commands differently. Negative commands always require "no" or some other negative qualifier before the verb. The affirmative vosotros/vosotras ending -d is usually replaced by -r, identical to the infinitive, in the spoken language, e.g. esperar un momento instead of esperad un momento, or sentaros instead of sentaos. Until recently the -r form was proscribed in written language.

Object pronouns are added after affirmative infinitives, but before negative ones. Contrast ¡Hazlo! "Do it!" with ¡No lo hagas! "Don't do it!".

The imperative can also be expressed in three other ways:

- Using the present or future indicative to form an emphatic command: Comerás la verdura ("You will eat the vegetables")
- The first person plural imperative ("Let's...") can also be expressed by Vamos a + infinitive: ¡Vamos a comer!
- Indirect commands with que: Que lo llame el secretario ("Have the secretary call him")

Imperative mood
| Verb class | tú | vos | usted | nosotr(os/as) | vosotr(os/as) | ustedes |
Regular verbs
| general | -a/-e (affirmative) no -e/-a (negative) | -V́ (affirmative) no -es/-as (negative) | -e/-a | -amos/-emos | -Vd (-Vr) (affirmative) no -éis/-áis (negative) | -en/-an |
| -ar verbs | -a no -e | -á no -es | -e | -emos | -ad (-ar) no -éis | -en |
| -er verbs | -e no -a | -é no -as | -a | -amos | -ed (-er) no -áis | -an |
| -ir verbs | -e no -a | -í no -as | -a | -amos | -id (-ir) no -áis | -an |
Irregular verbs
| asir | ase no asgas | así no asgas | asga | asgamos | asid no asgáis | asgan |
| caer | cae no caigas | caé no caigas | caiga | caigamos | caed no caigáis | caigan |
| caber | cabe no quepas | cabé no quepas | quepa | quepamos | cabed no quepáis | quepan |
| dar | da no des | | dé | demos | dad no dáis | den |
| decir | di no digas | decí no digas | diga | digamos | decid no digáis | digan |
| -ducir (e.g. conducir) | conduce no conduzcas | conducí no conduzcas | conduzca | conduzcamos | conducid no conduzcáis | conduzcan |
| estar (Note: For simple imperative commands, the verb estar is often made pronominal, estarse, for example, estate callado, estese callado, estaros callados, estense callados ('be silent'); this is virtually compulsory for the affirmative singular forms.) | está no estés | | esté | estemos | estad no estéis | estén |
| -facer | -faz no -fagas | -facé no -fagas | -faga | -fagamos | -faced no -fagáis | -fagan |
| haber | h(ab)e no hayas | | haya | hayamos | habed no hayáis | hayan |
| hacer | haz no hagas | hacé no hagas | haga | hagamos | haced no hagáis | hagan |
| ir | ve no vayas | andá no vayas | vaya | vamos | id no vayáis | vayan |
| oír | oye no oigas | oí no oigas | oiga | oigams | oíd | oigan |
| poner | pon no pongas | poné no pongas | ponga | pongamos | poned no pongáis | pongan |
| saber | sabe no sepas | sabé no sepas | sepa | sepamos | sabed no sepáis | sepan |
| salir | sal no salgas | salí no salgas | salga | salgamos | salid no salgáis | salgan |
| ser | sé no seas | | sea | seamos | sed no seáis | sean |
| tener | ten no tengas | tené no tengas | tenga | tengamos | tened no tengáis | tengan |
| traer | trae no traigas | traé no traigas | traiga | traigamos | traed no traigáis | traigan |
| valer | vale no valgas | valé no valgas | valga | valgamos | valed no valgáis | valgan |
| venir | ven no vengas | vení no vengas | venga | vengamos | venid no vengáis | vengan |
| ver (regular) | ve no veas | | vea | veamos | ved no veáis | vean |
| yacer | yace no yazgas | yacé no yazgas | yazga | yazgamos | yaced no yazgáis | yazgan |

==== Emphasizing the subject ====
If one wishes to place emphasis on the subject of a command, it is placed after the verbal word:

- Hazlo tú = "You do it"
- No lo diga usted = "Don't you [formal] say it"

=== The subjunctive mood ===
The subjunctive mood has a separate conjugation table with fewer tenses. It is used, almost exclusively in subordinate clauses, to express the speaker's opinion or judgment, such as doubts, possibilities, emotions, and events that may or may not occur. Contrasted with the infinitive, it refers to the potential or hypothetical actions not ones described as occurring or not. Regular -er and -ir verbs share their endings in all tenses of this mood. Additionally, the first person singular yo also shares all its forms with the third person singular él/ella.

==== Simple tenses (tiempos simples) ====
===== Present subjunctive (presente de subjuntivo) =====
The subjunctive present tense is regularly formed with indicative present -er endings for -ar verbs and indicative present -ar verb endings for -er and -ir verbs, roughly as if the three conjugations swap suffixes. In other words, -ar verbs take the thematic vowel -e- and -er and -ir verbs take the thematic vowel -a-.The distinct vos forms with an accent are proscribed by the Royal Spanish Academy, but are frequently used in Central American voseo. Verbs that had an irregular first person singular in the indicative present now apply the same irregularities to the rest of the endings too. However, the stem for saber is now sepa- not sé-. All of the irregular verbs listed for the indicative present will be listed here as well.

Subjunctive present tense
| Verb class | yo; él/ella; usted | tú | vos* | nosotr(os/as) | vosotr(os/as) | ell(os/as); ustedes |
Regular verbs
| general | -V | -Vs | -V́s | -Vmos | -Vis | -Vn |
| -ar verbs | -e | -es | -és | -emos | -éis | -en |
| -er/ -ir verbs | -a | -as | -ás | -amos | -áis | -an |
Irregular verbs
| asir | asga | asgas | asgás | asgamos | asgáis | asgan |
| caber | quepa | quepas | quepás | quepamos | quepáis | quepan |
| caer | caiga | caigas | caigás | caigamos | caigáis | caigan |
| conocer | conozca | conozcas | conozcás | conozcamos | conozcáis | conozcan |
| dar | dé | des | | demos | deis | den |
| decir | diga | digas | digás | digamos | digáis | digan |
| estar | esté | estés | | estemos | estéis | esten |
| ir | vaya | vayas | vayás | vayamos | vayáis | vayan |
| oír | oiga | oigas | oigás | oigamos | oigáis | oigan |
| poner | ponga | pongas | pongás | pongamos | pongáis | pongan |
| ser | sea | seas | seás | seamos | seáis | sean |
| traer | traiga | traigas | traigás | traigamos | traigáis | traigan |
| venir | venga | vengas | vengás | vengamos | vengáis | vengan |
| ver | vea | veas | veás | veamos | veáis | vean |
| yacer | yazga | yazgas | yazgás | yazgamos | yazgáis | yazgan |

===== Imperfect past subjunctive (imperfecto de subjuntivo) =====
The imperfect past subjunctive can be formed with either of two sets of endings: the "-ra endings" or the "-se endings", as shown below. In Spanish America, the -ra forms are virtually the only forms used. In Spain, both sets of forms are used, but the -ra forms are predominant as well. Each set of endings comes after a root vowel (-ar- for -ar verbs, -ie- for -er and -ir verbs). The -ra verbs put -r- before the -er/-ir subjunctive present endings, while the -se endings put -s- before the -ar subjunctive present endings.

As with the subjunctive present, the first person singular and third person singular forms are identical; however, the tú and vos forms are now merged as well. As with the indicative perfect past, ir and ser share verb forms.

Subjunctive imperfect past (-ra forms)
| Verb class | yo; él/ella; usted | tú/ vos | nosotr(os/as) | vosotr(os/as) | ell(os/as); ustedes |
Regular verbs
| general | -Vra | -Vras | -V́ramos | -Vrais | -Vran |
| -ar verbs | -ara | -aras | -áramos | -arais | -aran |
| -er/ -ir verbs | -iera | -ieras | -iéramos | -ierais | -ieran |
Irregular verbs
| andar | anduviera | anduvieras | anduviéramos | anduvierais | anduvieran |
| caber | cupiera | cupieras | cupiéramos | cupierais | cupieran |
| dar | diera | dieras | diéramos | dierais | dieran |
| decir | dijera | dijeras | dijéramos | dijerais | dijeran |
| -ducir | -dujera | -dujeras | -dujéramos | -dujerais | -dujeran |
| estar | estuviera | estuvieras | estuviéramos | estuvierais | estuvieran |
| -facer | -ficiera | -ficieras | -ficiéramos | -ficierais | -ficieran |
| haber | hubiera | huvieras | hubiéramos | hubierais | hubieran |
| hacer | hiciera | hicieras | hiciéramos | hicierais | hicieran |
| ir/ ser | fuera | fueras | fuéramos | fuerais | fueran |
| poder | pudiera | pudieras | pudiéramos | pudierais | pudieran |
| poner | pusiera | pusieras | pusiéramos | pusierais | pusieran |
| querer | quisiera | quisieras | quisiéramos | quisierais | quisieran |
| saber | supiera | supieras | supiéramos | supierais | supieran |
| tener | tuviera | tuvieras | tuviéramos | tuvierais | tuvieran |
| traer | trajera | trajeras | trajéramos | trajerais | trajeran |
| venir | viniera | vinieras | viniéramos | vinierais | vinieran |
| ver | viera | vieras | viéramos | vierais | vieran |

Subjunctive imperfective past (-se forms)
| Verb class | yo; él/ella; usted | tú/ vos | nosotr(os/as) | vosotr(os/as) | ell(os/as); ustedes |
Regular verbs
| general | -Vse | -Vses | -V́semos | -Vseis | -Vsen |
| -ar verbs | -ase | -ases | -ásemos | -aseis | -asen |
| -er/-ir verbs | -iese | -ieses | -iésemos | -ieseis | -iesen |
Irregular verbs
| andar | anduviese | anduviese | anduviésemos | anduvieseis | anduviesen |
| caber | cupiese | cupieses | cupiésemos | cupieseis | cupiesen |
| dar | diese | dieses | diésemos | dieseis | diesen |
| decir | dijese | dijeses | dijésemos | dijeseis | dijesen |
| -ducir | -dujese | -dujeses | -dujésemos | -dujeseis | -dujesen |
| estar | estuviese | estuviese | estuviésemos | estuvieseis | estuviesen |
| -facer | -ficiese | -ficieses | -ficiésemos | -ficieseis | -ficiesen |
| haber | hubiese | huvieses | hubiésemos | hubieseis | hubiesen |
| hacer | hiciese | hicieses | hiciésemos | hicieseis | hiciesen |
| ir/ ser | fuese | fueses | fuésemos | fueseis | fuesen |
| poder | pudiese | pudieses | pudiésemos | pudieseis | pudiesen |
| poner | pusiese | pusieses | pusiésemos | pusieseis | pusiesen |
| querer | quisiese | quisieses | quisiésemos | quisieseis | quisiesen |
| saber | supiese | supieses | supiésemos | supieseis | supiesen |
| tener | tuviese | tuvieses | tuviésemos | tuvieseis | tuviesen |
| traer | trajese | trajeses | trajésemos | trajeseis | trajesen |
| venir | viniese | vinieses | viniésemos | vinieseis | viniesen |
| ver | viese | vieses | viésemos | vieseis | viesen |

===== Future subjunctive (futuro (simple) de subjuntivo) =====
The future subjunctive is extremely rare in modern Spanish, mostly found in formal, poetic or legal language and some fixed expressions. It takes endings like the -ra endings of subjunctive imperfect past, but using an e vowel with them instead of an a. As with the imperfact past, the subjunctive future tenses of ir and ser use the same forms.

Subjunctive future tense
| Verb ckass | yo; él/ella; usted | tú/ vos | nosotr(os/as) | vosotr(os/as) | ell(os/as); ustedes |
Regular verbs
| general | -Vre | -Vres | -V́remos | -Vreis | -Vren |
| -ar verbs | -are | -ares | -áremos | -areis | -aren |
| -er/-ir verbs | -iere | -ieres | -iéremos | -iereis | -ieren |
Irregular verbs
| andar | anduviere | anduviere | anduviéremos | anduviereis | anduvieren |
| caber | cupiere | cupieres | cupiéremos | cupiereis | cupieren |
| dar | diere | dieres | diéremos | diereis | dieren |
| decir | dijere | dijeres | dijéremos | dijereis | dijeren |
| -ducir | -dujere | -dujeres | -dujéremos | -dujereis | -dujeren |
| estar | estuviere | estuvieres | estuviéremos | estuvieres | estuvieren |
| -facer | -ficiere | -ficieres | -ficiéremos | -ficiereis | -ficieren |
| haber | hubiere | huvieres | hubiéremos | hubiereis | hubieren |
| hacer | hiciere | hicieres | hiciéremos | hiciereis | hicieren |
| ir/ ser | fuere | fueres | fuéremos | fuereis | fueren |
| poder | pudiere | pudieres | pudiéremos | pudiereis | pudieren |
| poner | pusiere | pusieres | pusiéremos | pusiereis | pusieren |
| querer | quisiere | quisieres | quisiéremos | quisiereis | quisieren |
| saber | supiere | supieres | supiéremos | supiereis | supieren |
| tener | tuviere | tuvieres | tuviéremos | tuviereis | tuvieren |
| traer | trajere | trajeres | trajéremos | trajereis | trajeren |
| venir | viniere | vinieres | viniéremos | viniereis | vinieren |
| ver | viere | vieres | viéremos | viereis | vieren |

For example:

- Cuando hablaren... = "Whenever they might speak..."

==== Compound tenses (tiempos compuestos) ====
In the subjunctive mood, the subjunctive forms of the verb haber are used with the past participle of the main verb.

===== Present perfect subjunctive (pretérito perfecto de subjuntivo) =====
- Cuando yo haya hablado... = "When I have spoken..."

===== Pluperfect subjunctive (pluscuamperfecto de subjuntivo) =====
- Si yo hubiera hablado... or Si yo hubiese hablado... = "If I had spoken..."

===== Future perfect subjunctive (futuro compuesto de subjuntivo) =====
Like the future simple subjunctive, this tense is virtually no longer used in modern Spanish.

- Cuando yo hubiere hablado... = "When I shall have spoken..."
Notes:
- The present subjunctive is formed from the stem of the first person present indicative of a verb. Therefore, for a verb like salir with the "irregular" first person salgo, the present subjunctive would be salga (not sala).
- Likewise, the imperfect and future subjunctives are formed from the preterit stem, so that with pud- the stem of the preterit of poder, as in yo pude 'I was able', the imperfect and future subjunctives are pudiera/pudiese and pudiere, respectively (as opposed to podiera/podiese and podiere)
- The choice between present subjunctive and imperfect subjunctive is determined by the tense of the main verb of the sentence.
- The future subjunctive is rarely used in modern Spanish and mostly appears in old texts, legal documents, and certain fixed expressions, such as venga lo que viniere ("come what may").

=== Continuous tenses ===
In Spanish grammar, continuous tenses are not formally recognized as in English. Although the imperfect expresses a continuity compared to the perfect (e.g., te esperaba ["I was waiting for you"]), the continuity of an action is usually expressed by a verbal periphrasis (perífrasis verbal), as in estoy leyendo ("I am reading"). However, one can also say sigo leyendo ("I am still reading"), voy leyendo ("I am slowly but surely reading"), ando leyendo ("I am going around reading"), and others.

=== The passive ===
==== "True" passive ====
The "true" passive is formed with ser + the past participle, which in this case behaves like a normal adjective. Thus:

- Yo soy amado = "I [masc.] am loved"
- Tú eras amada = "You [fem.] were being loved"
- Nosotros seremos amados = "We [masc.] will be loved"
- Ellas habrían sido amadas = "They [fem.] would have been loved"

The "true" passive is used in a variety of situations, but its use is somewhat more limited than that of its English counterpart.

==== Se passive ====
In the third person, reflexive constructions are often used to express ideas that could also be expressed in the passive. In such constructions, the recipient of the action is said to do the action to itself. Thus:

- Se habla español = "Spanish is spoken" (lit. "Spanish speaks itself")
- Se me dio el libro = "The book was given to me" (lit. "The book gave itself to me")
- Se perdieron los datos = "The data were lost" (lit. "The data lost themselves")
- Se puede hacer [ello] = "It can be done" (lit. "It can do itself")

The se passive is very common in the third person, but equivalent constructions cannot be used for the first and second persons: Yo me amo always translates to "I love myself" and never "I am loved".

== Irregular verbs ==
A considerable number of verbs change the vowel e in the stem to the diphthong ie, and the vowel o to ue. This happens when the stem vowel receives the stress. These verbs are referred to as stem-changing verbs. Examples include pensar ("to think"; e.g., pienso ["I think"]), sentarse ("to sit"; e.g., me siento ["I sit"]), empezar ("to begin"; e.g., empiezo ["I begin"]), volver ("to return"; e.g., vuelvo ["I return"]), and acostarse ("to go to bed"; e.g., me acuesto ["I go to bed"]).

Virtually all verbs of the third conjugation (-ir), if they have an -e- or -o- as the last vowel of their stem, undergo a vowel-raising change whereby e changes to i and o changes to u, in some of their forms (for details, see Spanish irregular verbs). Examples include pedir ("to ask for"; e.g., pide ["he/she asks for"]), competir ("to compete"; e.g., compite ["he/she competes"]), and derretirse ("to melt"; e.g., se derrite ["it melts"]).

The so-called "go verbs" add a medial -g- in the first-person singular present tense (making the Yo ["I"] form end in -go; e.g., tener ["to have"] becomes tengo ["I have"]; venir ["to come"] becomes vengo ["I come"]). The -g- is present in the present subjunctive of such verbs. These verbs are often irregular in other forms as well.

== Usage ==
=== Contrasting simple and continuous forms ===
There is no strict distinction between simple and continuous forms in Spanish as there is in English. In English, "I do" is one thing (a habit) and "I am doing" is another (current activity). In Spanish, hago can be either of the two, and estoy haciendo stresses the latter. Although not as strict as English, Spanish is stricter than French or German, which have no systematic distinction between the two concepts at all. This optionally continuous meaning that can be underlined by using the continuous form is a feature of the present and imperfect. The preterite never has this meaning, even in the continuous form, and the future has it only when it is in the continuous form.

Present

- ¿Qué haces? could be either "What do you do?" or "What are you doing?"
- ¿Qué estás haciendo? is only "What are you doing?"

Imperfect

- ¿Qué hacías? could be either "What did you use to do?" or "What were you doing?"
- ¿Qué estabas haciendo? is only "What were you doing?"

Preterite

- ¿Qué hiciste? is "What did you do?"
- ¿Qué estuviste haciendo? is "What were you doing (all of that time)?"

Note that since the preterite by nature refers to an event seen as having a beginning and an end, and not as a context, the use of the continuous form of the verb only adds a feeling for the length of time spent on the action. The future has two main forms in Spanish, the imperfect (compound) future and the simple one. The difference between them is one of aspect. The compound future is done with the conjugated ir (which means "to go," but may also mean "will" in this case) plus the infinitive and, sometimes, with a present progressive verb added as well.

Future

- ¿Qué vas a hacer? is "What are you going to do?" (implies that it will be done again, as in a routine)
- ¿Qué vas a estar haciendo? is "What are you going to be doing?" (does not necessarily imply that it will be done)
- ¿Qué harás? is "What will you do?" (will be completed immediately, or done just once)
- ¿Qué estarás haciendo? is "What will you be doing?"

=== Contrasting the present and the future ===
Both the present and the future can express future actions, the latter more explicitly so. There are also expressions that convey the future.

- Mi padre llega mañana = "My father arrives tomorrow"
- Mi padre estará llegando mañana = "My father will be arriving tomorrow"
- Mi padre va a llegar mañana = "My father is going to arrive tomorrow" (future with ir)
- Mi padre llegará mañana = "My father will arrive tomorrow" (future tense)
- Mi padre está a punto de llegar = "My father is about to arrive" (immediate future with estar a punto)

The future tense can also simply express guesses about the present and immediate future:

- ¿Qué hora es? Serán las tres = "What time is it?" "It is about three (but I have not checked)"
- ¿Quién llama a la puerta? Será José = "Who is at the door? It must be José"

The same is applied to imperfect and conditional:

- ¿Qué hora era? Serían las tres = "What time was it?" "It was about three (but I had not checked)"
- ¿Quién llamaba a la puerta? Sería José = "Who was at the door? It must have been José"

Studies have shown that Spanish-speaking children learn this use of the future tense before they learn to use it to express future events (the English future with "will" can also sometimes be used with this meaning). The other constructions detailed above are used instead. Indeed, in some areas, such as Argentina and Uruguay, speakers hardly use the future tense to refer to the future.

The future tense of the subjunctive mood is also obsolete in practice. As of today, it is only found in legal documents and the like. In other contexts, the present subjunctive form always replaces it.

=== Contrasting the preterite and the imperfect ===
==== Fundamental meanings of the preterite and the imperfect ====
Spanish has two fundamental past tenses, the preterite and the imperfect. Strictly speaking, the difference between them is one not of tense but of aspect, in a manner that is similar to that of the Slavic languages. However, within Spanish grammar, they are customarily called tenses.

The difference between the preterite and the imperfect (and in certain cases, the perfect) is often hard to grasp for English speakers. English has just one past-tense form, which can have aspect added to it by auxiliary verbs, but not in ways that reliably correspond to what occurs in Spanish. The distinction between them does, however, correspond rather well to the distinctions in other Romance languages, such as between the French imparfait and passé simple / passé composé or between the Italian imperfetto and passato remoto / passato prossimo.

The imperfect fundamentally presents an action or state as being a context and is thus essentially descriptive. It does not present actions or states as having ends and often does not present their beginnings either. Like the Slavic imperfective past, it tends to show actions that used to be done at some point, as in a routine. In this case, one would say Yo jugaba ("I used to play"), Yo leía ("I used to read"), or Yo escribía ("I used to write").

The preterite (as well as the perfect, when applicable) fundamentally presents an action or state as being an event, and is thus essentially narrative. It presents actions or states as having beginnings and ends. This also bears resemblance to the Slavic perfective past, as these actions are usually viewed as done in one stroke. The corresponding preterite forms would be Yo jugué ("I played"), Yo leí ("I read") or Yo escribí ("I wrote").

As stated above, deciding whether to use the preterite or the imperfect can present some difficulty for English speakers. But there are certain topics, words, and key phrases that can help one decide if the verb should be conjugated in the preterite or the imperfect. These expressions co-occur significantly more often with one or the other of the two tenses, corresponding to a completed action (preterite) or a repetitive action or a continuous action or state (imperfect) in the past.

Key words and phrases that tend to co-occur with the preterite tense:

- ayer ("yesterday")
- anteayer ("the day before yesterday")
- anoche ("last night")
- durante dos siglos ("for two centuries")
- por un rato ("for a while")
- el otro día ("the other day")
- entonces ("then")
- luego ("then"; "and then")
- esta mañana ("this morning")
- esta tarde ("this afternoon")
- la semana pasada ("last week")
- el mes pasado ("last month")
- el año pasado ("last year")
- hace dos días/años ("two days/years ago")
- de repente ("suddenly")
- en 1954, etc. (years)
- el 25 de enero, etc. (dates)
- durante ("during")
- muchas veces ("many times")
- dos/tres veces ("twice"/"three times")
- tantas veces ("so many times")
- varias veces ("several times")
- nunca ("never")
- tan pronto como ("as soon as")
- después de que ("after")
- desde que ("since")

E.g.: Esta mañana comí huevos y pan tostado ("This morning I ate eggs and toast")

Key words and phrases that tend to co-occur with the imperfect tense:

- a menudo ("often")
- a veces ("sometimes")
- cada día ("every day")
- cada semana ("every week")
- cada mes ("every month")
- cada año ("every year")
- con frecuencia ("frequently")
- de vez en cuando ("from time to time")
- en aquella época ("at that time")
- frecuentemente ("frequently")
- generalmente ("usually")
- todas las semanas ("every week")
- todos los días ("every day")
- todo el tiempo ("all the time")
- constantemente ("constantly")
- mientras ("while")
- regularmente ("regularly")
- por lo general ("generally")
- todavía ("still")
- ya ("already")
- Eran las tres, etc. ("It was three o'clock," etc.)
- Estaba nublado, etc. ("It was cloudy," etc.)

E.g.: Cada año mi familia iba a Puerto Rico. ("Each year my family went to Puerto Rico.")

==== Comparison with English usage ====
The English simple past can express either of these concepts. However, there are devices that allow us to be more specific. Consider, for example, the phrase "the sun shone" in the following contexts:

1. "The sun shone through his window; John knew that it was going to be a fine day."
2. "The sun was shining through his window; John knew that it was going to be a fine day."
3. "The sun shone through his window back in those days."
4. "The sun used to shine through his window back in those days."
5. "The sun shone through his window the moment that John pulled back the curtain."

In the first two, it is clear that the shining refers to the background to the events that are about to unfold in the story. It is talking about what was happening. One has a choice between making this explicit with the past continuous, as in (2), or using the simple past and allowing the context to make it clear what is intended, as in (1). In Spanish, these would be in the imperfect, optionally in the imperfect continuous.

In (3) and (4), it is clear that the shining refers to a regular, general, habitual event. It is talking about what used to happen. One has a choice between making this explicit with the expression "used to," as in (4), or using the simple past and allowing the context to make it clear what we mean, as in (3). In Spanish, these would be in the imperfect, optionally with the auxiliary verb soler.

In (5), only the simple past is possible. It is talking about a single event presented as occurring at a specific point in time (the moment John pulled back the curtain). The action starts and ends with this sentence. In Spanish, this would be in the preterite (or alternatively in the perfect, if the event has only just happened).

==== Further examples ====
- Cuando tenía quince años, me atropelló un coche = "When I was fifteen years old, a car ran over me"

The imperfect is used for "was" in Spanish because it forms the background to the specific event expressed by "ran over", which is in the preterite.

- Mientras cruzaba/estaba cruzando la calle, me atropelló un coche = "While I crossed/was crossing the road, a car ran over me"

In both languages, the continuous form for action in progress is optional, but Spanish requires the verb in either case to be in the imperfect, because it is the background to the specific event expressed by "ran over", in the preterite.

- Siempre tenía cuidado cuando cruzaba la calle = "I was always/always used to be careful when I crossed/used to cross the road"

The imperfect is used for both verbs since they refer to habits in the past. Either verb could optionally use the expression "used to" in English.

- Me bañaba = "I took baths"

The preterite is used if this refers to a single action or event—that is, the person took a bath last night.

- Me bañé = "I took a bath"

The imperfect is used if this refers to any sort of habitual action—that is, the person took a bath every morning. Optionally, solía bañarme can specifically express "I used to take baths".

- Tuvo una hija = "She had a daughter"

The preterite is used if this refers to an event—here, a birth.

- Tenía una hija = "She had a/one daughter"

The imperfect is used if this refers to the number of children by a certain point, as in "She had one daughter when I met her ten years ago; she may have more now". A description.

Note that when describing the life of someone who is now dead, the distinction between the two tenses blurs. One might describe the person's life saying tenía una hija, but tuvo una hija is very common because the person's whole life is viewed as a whole, with a beginning and an end. The same goes for vivía/vivió en... "he lived in...".

Perhaps the verb that English speakers find most difficult to translate properly is "to be" in the past tense ("was"). Apart from the choice between the verbs ser and estar (see below), it is often very hard for English speakers to distinguish between contextual and narrative uses.

- Alguien cogió mis CD. ¿Quién fue? = "Someone took my CDs. Who was it?"

Here the preterite is used because it is an event. A good clue is the tense in which cogió is.

- Había una persona que miraba los CD. ¿Quién era? = "There was a person who was looking at the CDs. Who was it?"

Here the imperfect is used because it is a description (the start and end of the action is not presented; it is something that was in progress at a certain time). Again, a good clue is the tense of the other verbs.

=== Contrasting the preterite and the perfect ===
The preterite and the perfect are distinguished in a similar way as the equivalent English tenses. Generally, whenever the present perfect ("I have done") is used in English, the perfect is also used in Spanish. In addition, there are cases in which English uses a simple past ("I did") but Spanish requires a perfect. In the remaining cases, both languages use a simple past.

As in English, the perfect expresses past actions that have some link to the present. The preterite expresses past actions as being past, complete and done with. In both languages, there are dialectal variations.

==== Frame of reference includes the present: perfect ====
If it is implicitly or explicitly communicated that the frame of reference for the event includes the present and the event or events may therefore continue occurring, then both languages strongly prefer the perfect.

With references including "this" including the present

- Este año me he ido de vacaciones dos veces = "This year I have gone on vacation twice"
- Esta semana ha sido muy interesante = "This week has been very interesting"

With other references to recent periods including the present

- No he hecho mucho hoy = "I have not done much today"
- No ha pasado nada hasta la fecha = "Nothing has happened to date"
- Hasta ahora no se me ha ocurrido = "Until now it has not occurred to me"

With reference to someone's life experience (his/her life not being over)

- ¿Alguna vez has estado en África? = "Have you ever been in Africa?"
- Mi vida no ha sido muy interesante = "My life has not been very interesting"
- Jamás he robado nada = "Never have I stolen anything"

==== Frame of reference superficially includes the present: perfect ====
Sometimes expressions like "today", "this year", and "this week" are used to express the idea these periods are over. This requires the simple past in English. For example, in December one might speak of the year in the simple past because we are assuming that all of that year's important events have occurred and one can talk as though it were over. Other expressions—such as "this weekend", if today is Monday—refer to a period which is definitely over; the word "this" just distinguishes it from other weekends. There is a tendency in Spanish to use the perfect even for this type of time reference, even though the preterite is possible and seems more logical.

- Este fin de semana hemos ido al zoo = "This weekend we went to the zoo"
- Hoy he tenido una jornada muy aburrida = "Today I had a very boring day at work"

==== Consequences continue into the present: perfect ====
As in English, the perfect is used when the consequences of an event are referred to.

- Alguien ha roto esta ventana = "Someone has broken this window" (the window is currently in a broken state)
- Nadie me ha dicho qué pasó aquel día = "Nobody has told me what happened that day" (therefore, I still do not know)

These same sentences in the preterite would purely refer to the past actions, without any implication that they have repercussions now.

In English, this type of perfect is not possible if a precise time frame is added or even implied. One cannot say "I have been born in 1978," because the date requires "I was born," despite the fact there is arguably a present consequence in the fact that the person is still alive. Spanish sporadically uses the perfect in these cases.

- He nacido en 1978 (usually Nací en 1978) = "I was born in 1978"
- Me he criado en Madrid (usually Me crié en Madrid) = "I grew up in Madrid"

==== The event itself continues into the present: perfect or present ====
If the event itself has been happening recently and is also happening right now or expected to continue happening soon, then the preterite is impossible in both languages. English requires the perfect, or better yet the perfect continuous. Spanish requires the perfect, or better yet the present :

- Últimamente ha llovido mucho / Últimamente llueve mucho = "It has rained / It has been raining a lot recently"

This is the only use of the perfect that is common in colloquial speech across Latin America.

==== Dialectal variation ====
In the Canary Islands and across Latin America, there is a colloquial tendency to replace most uses of the perfect with the preterite. This use varies according to region, register, and education.

- ¿Y vos alguna vez estuviste allá? = ¿Y tú alguna vez has estado allí? = "And have you ever been there?"

The one use of the perfect that does seem to be normal in Latin America is the perfect for actions that continue into the present (not just the time frame, but the action itself). Therefore, "I have read a lot in my life" and "I read a lot this morning" would both be expressed with leí instead of he leído, but "I have been reading" is expressed by he leído.

A less standard use of the perfect is found in Ecuador and Colombia. It is used with present or occasionally even future meaning. For example, Shakira Mebarak in her song "Ciega, Sordomuda" sings,

- Bruta, ciega, sordomuda, / torpe, traste, testaruda; / es todo lo que he sido = "Clumsy, blind, dumb, / blundering, useless, pig-headed; / that is all that I had been"

=== Contrasting the subjunctive and the imperative ===
The subjunctive mood expresses wishes and hypothetical events. It is often employed together with a conditional verb:

- Desearía que estuvieses aquí. = "I wish that you were here."
- Me alegraría mucho si volvieras mañana. = "I would be very glad if you came back tomorrow."

The imperative mood shows commands given to the hearer (the second person). There is no imperative form in the third person, so the subjunctive is used. The expression takes the form of a command or wish directed at the hearer, but referring to the third person. The difference between a command and a wish is subtle, mostly conveyed by the absence of a wishing verb:

- Que venga el gerente. = "Let the manager come.", "Have the manager come."
- Que se cierren las puertas. = "Let the doors be closed.", "Have the doors closed."

With a verb that expresses wishing, the above sentences become plain subjunctive instead of direct commands:

- Deseo que venga el gerente. = "I wish for the manager to come."
- Quiero que se cierren las puertas. = "I want the doors (to be) closed."

=== Contrasting the present and the future subjunctive ===
The future tense of the subjunctive is found mostly in old literature or legal language and is even misused in conversation by confusing it with the past tense (often due to the similarity of its characteristic suffix, -ere, as opposed to the suffixes of the past tense, -era and -ese). It is very rare otherwise.

It survives in the common expression sea lo que fuere and the proverb allá donde fueres, haz lo que vieres (allá donde can be replaced by a la tierra donde or si a Roma).

The proverb illustrates how it used to be used:

- With si referring to the future, as in si a Roma fueres.... This is now expressed with the present indicative: si vas a Roma... or si fueras a Roma...
- With cuando, donde, and the like, referring to the future, as in allá donde fueres.... This is now expressed with the present subjunctive: vayas adonde vayas...

=== Contrasting the preterite and the past anterior ===
The past anterior is rare nowadays and restricted to formal use. It expresses a very fine nuance: the fact that an action occurs just after another (had) occurred, with words such as cuando, nada más, and en cuanto ("when", "no sooner", "as soon as"). In English, one must use either the simple past or the past perfect; Spanish has something specific between the two.

- En cuanto el delincuente hubo salido del cuarto, la víctima se echó a llorar = "As soon as the criminal (had) left the room, the victim burst into tears"

The use of hubo salido shows that the second action happened immediately after the first. Salió might imply that it happened at the same time, and había salido might imply it happened some time after.

However, colloquial Spanish has lost this tense and the corresponding nuance, and the preterite must be used instead in all but the most formal of writing.

=== Contrasting ser and estar ===
The differences between ser and estar are considered one of the most difficult concepts for non-native speakers. Both ser and estar translate into English as "to be", but they have different uses, depending on whether they are used with nouns, with adjectives, with past participles (more precisely, passive participles), or to express location.

Only ser is used to equate one noun phrase with another, and thus it is the verb for expressing a person's occupation ("Mi hermano es estudiante"/"My brother is a student"). For the same reason, ser is used for telling the date or the time, regardless of whether the subject is explicit ("Hoy es miércoles"/"Today is Wednesday") or merely implied ("Son las ocho"/"It's eight o'clock").

When these verbs are used with adjectives, the difference between them may be generalized by saying that ser expresses nature and estar expresses state. Frequently—although not always—adjectives used with ser express a permanent quality, while their use with estar expresses a temporary situation. There are exceptions to the generalization; for example, the sentence "Tu mamá está loca" ("Your mother is crazy") can express either a temporary or a permanent state of craziness.

Ser generally focuses on the essence of the subject, and specifically on qualities that include:

1. Nationality
2. Possession
3. Physical and personality traits
4. Material
5. Origin

Estar generally focuses on the condition of the subject, and specifically on qualities that include:

1. Physical condition
2. Feelings, emotions, and states of mind
3. Appearance

In English, the sentence "The boy is boring" uses a different adjective than "The boy is bored". In Spanish, the difference is made by the choice of ser or estar.

- El chico es aburrido uses ser to express a permanent trait ("The boy is boring").
- El chico está aburrido uses estar to express a temporary state of mind ("The boy is bored").

The same strategy is used with many adjectives to express either an inherent trait (ser) or a transitory state or condition (estar). For example:

- "María es guapa" uses ser to express an essential trait, meaning "María is a good-looking person."
- "María está guapa" uses estar to express a momentary impression: "María looks beautiful" (a comment on her present appearance, without any implication about her inherent characteristics).

When ser is used with the past participle of a verb, it forms the "true" passive voice, expressing an event ("El libro fue escrito en 2005"/"The book was written in 2005"). When the past participle appears with estar, it forms a "passive of result" or "stative passive" ("El libro ya está escrito"/"The book is already written"—see Spanish conjugation).

Location of a person or thing is expressed with estar—regardless of whether temporary or permanent ("El hotel está en la esquina"/"The hotel is on the corner"). Location of an event is expressed with ser ("La reunión es en el hotel"/"The meeting is [takes place] in the hotel").

=== Contrasting haber and tener ===
The verbs haber and tener are easily distinguished, but they may pose a problem for learners of Spanish who speak other Romance languages (where the cognates of haber and tener are used differently), and for English speakers (where "have" is used as a verb and as an auxiliary). Haber derives from Latin habeō, with the basic meaning of "to have". Tener derives from Latin teneō, with the basic meaning of "to hold", "to keep". As habeō began to degrade and become reduced to just ambiguous monosyllables in the present tense, the Iberian Romance languages (languages closely related to Spanish) restricted its use and started to use teneō as the ordinary verb expressing having and possession.

==== Haber: expressing existence ====
Haber can be used as an impersonal verb expressing existence ("there is/are"). When used impersonally, haber has a special present-tense form: hay instead of ha. The y is presumed to be a fossilized form of the mediaeval Castilian clitic pronoun y or i, once meaning "there", but now semantically empty. It is cognate with French y, Catalan hi and Italian vi from Latin ibi.

Unlike in English, in standard Spanish the thing that "is there" is not the subject of the sentence, and therefore there is no agreement between it and the verb (there is often agreement though in dialectal Spanish). This echoes constructions seen in languages such as French (il y a = "it there has"), Catalan (hi ha = "[it] there has"), and even Chinese (有 yǒu = "[it] has"):

- Hay un gato en el jardín. = "There is a cat in the garden."
- En el baúl hay fotografías viejas. = "In the trunk there are some old photos."

To form perfect constructions, the past participle habido is used:

- Ha habido mucha confusión de esto. = "There's been a lot of confusion about this."
- Ha habido pocos hasta ahora. = "There have been few so far."

In certain types of emphasis it is possible to put the verb after the object:

- ¿Revistas hay? = "Are there any magazines?"

There is a tendency to make haber agree with what follows, as though it were the subject, particularly in tenses other than the present indicative. There is heavier stigma on inventing plural forms for hay, but hain, han, and suchlike are sometimes encountered in non-standard speech. The form habemos is common (meaning "there are, including me"); it very rarely replaces hemos to form the present perfect tense in modern language, and in certain contexts it is even acceptable in formal or literary language:

- Había un hombre en la casa. = "There was a man in the house."
- Había unos hombres en la casa. = "There were some men in the house." (standard)
- Habían unos hombres en la casa. = "There were some men in the house." (non-standard)
- En esta casa habemos cinco personas. = "In this house there are five of us." (non-standard)
- Habría habido muchos más si supiera. = "There would have been a lot more if I knew." (standard)
- Nos las habemos con un gran jugador. = "We are confronting a great player." (standard)

As an existential verb, haber is never used other than in the third person. To express the existence of a first or second person, the verb estar ("to be [located/present]") or existir ("to exist") are used.

==== Haber: impersonal obligation ====
The phrase haber que + infinitive carries the meaning of necessity or obligation without specifying an agent. It is translatable as "need to be" or "be necessary that", but a paraphrase is generally preferable in translation. Note that the present-tense form is hay, as this use is also defective and only exists in the third person singular.

- Hay que abrir esa puerta. = "That door needs to be opened", "We have to open that door".
- Habrá que abrir esa puerta. = "It is necessary that door be opened", "We are going to have to open that door".
- Aunque haya que abrir esa puerta. = "Even if that door needs to be opened".

This construction is comparable to French il faut and Catalan cal. Hay que always goes with the infinitive.

==== Haber: personal obligation ====
A separate construction is haber de + infinitive. It tends to express a certain nuance of obligation and a certain nuance of future tense, much like the expression "to be to" or "ought to". It is also often used similarly to tener que and deber ("must", "should"). It is not impersonal and inflects for all persons and numbers. Note that the third personal singular of the present tense is ha not hay.

- Mañana he de dar una charla ante la Universidad = "Tomorrow I am to give a speech before the University".
- Ha de comer más verduras = "She/he ought to eat more vegetables".

==== Haber: forming the perfect ====
Haber is also used as an auxiliary to form the perfect, as shown elsewhere. Spanish uses only haber for this, unlike French and Italian, which use the corresponding cognates of haber for most verbs, but cognates of ser ("to be") for certain others.

- Ella se ha ido al mercado = "She has gone to the market"
- Ellas se han ido de paseo = "They have gone on a walk"
- ¿Habéis fregado los platos? = "Have you (all) done the washing-up?"

==== Tener ====
Tener is a verb with the basic meaning of "to have", in its essential sense of "to possess", "to hold", "to own". As in English, it can also express obligation (tener que + infinitive, "have to"/ "got to"). It also appears in a number of phrases that show emotion or physical states, expressed by nouns, which in English tend to be expressed by "to be" and an adjective.

- Mi hijo tiene una casa nueva = "My son has a new house"
- Tenemos que hablar = "We have to talk"
- Tengo hambre = "I am hungry" (lit. "I have hunger")

There are numerous phrases like tener hambre that are not often literally translated in English, such as:

- tener sed = "to be thirsty"; "to have thirst"
- tener cuidado = "to be careful"; "to have caution"
- tener __ años = "to be __ years old"; "to have __ years"
- tener celos = "to be jealous"; "to have jealousy"
- tener éxito = "to be successful"; "to have success"
- tener vergüenza = "to be ashamed"; "to have shame"

=== Negation ===
Verbs are negated by putting no before the verb. Other negative words can either replace this no or occur after the verb. Note that Spanish requires double negation, unlike English:

- Hablo español = "I speak Spanish"
- No hablo español = "I do not speak Spanish"
- Nunca hablo español = "I never speak Spanish"; with nunca "never" in place of no
- No hablo nunca español = "I do not ever speak Spanish" lit. "I do not never speak Spanish"; with double negatives and the second negative nunca going before the object

=== Expressing movement ===
Spanish verbs describing motion tend to emphasize direction instead of manner of motion. This makes Spanish a verb-framed language. This contrasts with English, where verbs tend to emphasize manner, and the direction of motion is left to helper particles, prepositions, or adverbs.

- "We drove away" = Nos fuimos en coche (lit. "We went (away) by car")
- "He swam to Ibiza" = Fue a Ibiza nadando (lit. "He went to Ibiza swimming")
- "They ran off" = Huyeron corriendo (lit. "They fled running")
- "She crawled in" = Entró a gatas (lit. "She entered on all fours")

Quite often, the important thing is the direction, not the manner. Therefore, although "we drove away" translates into Spanish as nos fuimos en coche, it is often better to translate it as just nos fuimos. For example:

La llevé al aeropuerto en coche, pero se le había olvidado el tiquete, así que fuimos a casa [en coche] por él, luego volvimos [en coche] hacia el aeropuerto, pero luego tuvimos que volver [en coche] por el pasaporte, y ya era imposible que consiguiésemos facturar el equipaje... = "I drove her to the airport, but she had forgotten her ticket, so we drove home to get it, then drove back towards the airport, but then had to drive back home for her passport, by which time there was zero chance of checking in..."

== Impersonal forms ==
=== Summary ===
Impersonal forms of verbs are forms of the verb that do not refer to a specific subject. They can, however, take object pronouns as suffixes. They are the infinitive, active and passive participles, and verbal nouns. Additionally, some verbs can take on an impersonal meaning.

Inflection summary
| Impersonal form | general | -ar verbs | -er verbs | -ir verbs |
|---|---|---|---|---|
| infinitive | -Vr | -ar | -er | -ir |
| reflexive infinitive | -Vrse | -arse | -erse | -irse |
| active present participle | -Vndo | -ando | -iendo | |
| reflexive present participle | -V́ndose | -ándose | -iéndose | |
| passive past participle | -Vdo | -ado | -ido | |
| reflexive past participle | -Vdose | -adose | -idose | |
| active past participle | -Vnte | -ante | -iente | |
| verbal noun | el -Vr | el -ar | el -er | el -ir |

=== Infinitives ===
Spanish infinitives are the base form of the verb. As in English, they can be used in a sentence to directly reference the action itself. There are three different infinitives: -ar, -er, and -ir, which each denote a separate verb class. Some verbs take an accent on the vowel, such as oír "to hear". Reflexive infinitives act as a base form for reflexive verbs and simply add -se to a normal infinitive ending.

=== Participles ===
Spanish also has participles, which form adjectives and nouns based on a direct reference to a verb. They are divided by tense (present or past), then by voice (active, passive, or reflexive). As adjectives, they inflect for number, and if they end in -o, gender as well. Feminines are made by changing any -o to -a, and plurals add -s to the end of the word. As forms of a verb, they are undeclinable.

==== Present participles ====
Present participles, in the case of Spanish also known as gerunds, can be either active or reflexive. Present participles refer to an ongoing action and make an adjective or express the progressive aspect of a verb. Active participles are made by adding -ando to -ar verbs and -iendo to -er or -ir verbs. By default, present participles are active, but can be made reflexive by adding -se to the active present participle.

==== Past participles ====
Passive past participles are significantly more productive than their active counterparts. They are used to form adjectives directly referring to a result of the verb, or form perfect aspects when combined with haber. They are formed by adding -ado to -ar verbs or -ido to -er or -ir verbs. When used as an adjective, passive participles inflect for number and gender like normal adjectives. When used after haber to form perfect tenses, passive participles stay in the masculine singular. Spanish reflexive past participles simply add -se to the passive past participle. Many Spanish passive participles are irregular, or have an irregular form used as an adjective but a regular form used to form the perfect aspect. Some former irregular passive participles are now independent adjectives distinct from their parent verb, such as confuso "confused", poseso "possessed", suspenso "hung".

Active past participles make a noun and/or an adjective based on an in-progress action or an action done to something else, and are usually fossilized words. -Ar verbs take an -ante, and -er and -ir verbs take an -iente. -Ente can occur as a variant suffix. The result is declinable for number, but not gender. The gender of active participles is dependent on surrounding words or context of the sentence.

Irregular participles
| Infinitive | Passive participle | Notes |
|---|---|---|
| abrir "to open" | abierto | |
| cubrir "to cover" | cubierto | |
| decir | dicho | |
| elegir "to select, elect" | elecho, elegido | |
| escribir "to write" | escrito | |
| -facer | -fecho | derivatives of hacer |
| freír "to fry" | frito, freído | |
| hacer | hecho | |
| morir "to die" | muerto | |
| poner | puesto | |
| prender "to catch; to light" | preso | |
| -primir (suffix, "-press") | -preso | premir (once meaning to press, squeeze) is obsolete and now replaced by apretar |
| pudrir "to rot" | podrido | |
| romper "to break" | roto | |
| -scribir (suffix, "-scribe") | -scrito, -scripto | derivatives of escribir -scripto is used in Argentina, Paraguay, and Uruguay, -scrito elsewhere |
| -solver (suffix, "-solve") | -suelto | solver (once meaning "to solve") is obsolete and now replaced by resolver |
| ver | visto | |
| volver "to return; to turn" | vuelto | |

=== Verbal nouns ===
Spanish verbal nouns (e.g. "running", "coming", "thinking" in English) are identical in form to the infinitive of the verb from which they are derived, and their gender is masculine. They can be used with the definite article, and enclitic pronouns attach to them as they would to a normal infinitive. Negation can be done by adding a no between the article and the infinitive.

- (el) comer = "eating"
- (el) correr = "running"
- (el) no esperar = "not waiting"
- (el) darte un libro = "giving you a book"
- (el) guardárselos = "saving them (m.) for him/her/them/you (singular, formal)"

=== Impersonal verbs ===
Many verbs can be used without a subject, such as references to natural or autonomous actions like llueve "it's raining". Contrast this with English requiring the dummy pronoun "it" or "they".

The word hay "there is/are" comes from a variant of the haber inflection ha. It has a past tense equivalent había "there are/were". These do not inflect for number, gender, nor person. Haber as a whole is defective (meaning many forms cannot be used) because it is only used with another verb either to form the perfective aspect, or to form the retrospective imperative (equivalent to "you should have [verb]"). Its former meaning "to have" is completely taken over by tener.

== Full list of synthetic forms for example word hablar ==
The following table lists all synthetic / non-periphrastic conjugations of the verb hablar (that is, excluding tenses formed with auxiliaries like "estoy hablando" or "he hablado"), each with all of the grammatical features that they encode (or, one possible analysis thereof).

The preterite tense is modeled below as past tense with perfective aspect, and the imperfect tense is modeled as past tense with imperfective aspect.

In Spanish, formality and gender are only inflected in the imperative and participle forms, respectively.

Synthetic forms of hablar
| | role (finite / non-finite) | number | person | tense | aspect | mood | gender | formality |
|---|---|---|---|---|---|---|---|---|
| hablar | infinitive | | | | | | | |
| hablo | finite | singular | first-person | present | simple | indicative | | |
| hablas / hablás (voseo form) | finite | singular | second-person | present | simple | indicative | | |
| habla | finite | singular | third-person | present | simple | indicative | | |
| hablamos | finite | plural | first-person | present | simple | indicative | | |
| habláis | finite | plural | second-person | present | simple | indicative | | |
| hablan | finite | plural | third-person | present | simple | indicative | | |
| hablé | finite | singular | first-person | past | perfective | indicative | | |
| hablaste | finite | singular | second-person | past | perfective | indicative | | |
| habló | finite | singular | third-person | past | perfective | indicative | | |
| hablamos | finite | plural | first-person | past | perfective | indicative | | |
| hablasteis | finite | plural | second-person | past | perfective | indicative | | |
| hablaron | finite | plural | third-person | past | perfective | indicative | | |
| hablaba | finite | singular | first-person | past | imperfective | indicative | | |
| hablabas | finite | singular | second-person | past | imperfective | indicative | | |
| hablaba | finite | singular | third-person | past | imperfective | indicative | | |
| hablábamos | finite | plural | first-person | past | imperfective | indicative | | |
| hablabais | finite | plural | second-person | past | imperfective | indicative | | |
| hablaban | finite | plural | third-person | past | imperfective | indicative | | |
| hablaré | finite | singular | first-person | future | simple | indicative | | |
| hablarás | finite | singular | second-person | future | simple | indicative | | |
| hablará | finite | singular | third-person | future | simple | indicative | | |
| hablaremos | finite | plural | first-person | future | simple | indicative | | |
| hablaréis | finite | plural | second-person | future | simple | indicative | | |
| hablarán | finite | plural | third-person | future | simple | indicative | | |
| hablaría | finite | singular | first-person | | simple | conditional / indicative | | |
| hablarías | finite | singular | second-person | | simple | conditional / indicative | | |
| hablaría | finite | singular | third-person | | simple | conditional / indicative | | |
| hablaríamos | finite | plural | first-person | | simple | conditional / indicative | | |
| hablaríais | finite | plural | second-person | | simple | conditional / indicative | | |
| hablarían | finite | plural | third-person | | simple | conditional / indicative | | |
| hable | finite | singular | first-person | present | simple | subjunctive | | |
| hables / hablés (voseo form) | finite | singular | second-person | present | simple | subjunctive | | |
| hable | finite | singular | third-person | present | simple | subjunctive | | |
| hablemos | finite | plural | first-person | present | simple | subjunctive | | |
| habléis | finite | plural | second-person | present | simple | subjunctive | | |
| hablen | finite | plural | third-person | present | simple | subjunctive | | |
| hablara / hablase | finite | singular | first-person | past | imperfective | subjunctive | | |
| hablaras / hablases | finite | singular | second-person | past | imperfective | subjunctive | | |
| hablara / hablase | finite | singular | third-person | past | imperfective | subjunctive | | |
| habláramos / hablásemos | finite | plural | first-person | past | imperfective | subjunctive | | |
| hablarais / hablaseis | finite | plural | second-person | past | imperfective | subjunctive | | |
| hablaran / hablasen | finite | plural | third-person | past | imperfective | subjunctive | | |
| ~~hablare~~ (obsolete) | finite | singular | first-person | future | simple | subjunctive | | |
| ~~hablares~~ (obsolete) | finite | singular | second-person | future | simple | subjunctive | | |
| ~~hablare~~ (obsolete) | finite | singular | third-person | future | simple | subjunctive | | |
| ~~habláremos~~ (obsolete) | finite | plural | first-person | future | simple | subjunctive | | |
| ~~hablareis~~ (obsolete) | finite | plural | second-person | future | simple | subjunctive | | |
| ~~hablaren~~ (obsolete) | finite | plural | third-person | future | simple | subjunctive | | |
| habla / hablá (voseo form) | finite | singular | second-person | | | imperative | | familiar |
| hable | finite | singular | second-person | | | imperative | | formal |
| hablad | finite | plural | second-person | | | imperative | | familiar |
| hablen | finite | plural | second-person | | | imperative | | formal |
| hablado | participle | singular | | | | | masculine | |
| hablada | participle | singular | | | | | feminine | |
| hablados | participle | plural | | | | | masculine | |
| habladas | participle | plural | | | | | feminine | |
| hablando | gerund | | | | | | | |

== See also ==
- Romance verbs
