= Spanish conjugation =

Conjugation of verbs in the Spanish language

This article presents a set of paradigms—that is, conjugation tables—of Spanish verbs, including examples of regular verbs and some of the most common irregular verbs. For other irregular verbs and their common patterns, see the article on Spanish irregular verbs.

The tables include only the "simple" tenses (that is, those formed with a single word), and not the "compound" tenses (those formed with an auxiliary verb plus a non-finite form of the main verb), such as the progressive, perfect, and passive voice. The progressive aspects (also called "continuous tenses") are formed by using the appropriate tense of estar + present participle (gerundio), and the perfect constructions are formed by using the appropriate tense of haber + past participle (participio). When the past participle is used in this way, it invariably ends with -o. In contrast, when the participle is used as an adjective, it agrees in gender and number with the noun modified. Similarly, the participle agrees with the subject when it is used with ser to form the "true" (dynamic) passive voice (e.g. La carta fue escrita ayer 'The letter was written [got written] yesterday.'), and also when it is used with estar to form a "passive of result", or stative passive (as in La carta ya está escrita 'The letter is already written.').

The pronouns yo, tú, vos, él, nosotros, vosotros and ellos are used to symbolise the three persons and two numbers. Note, however, that Spanish is a pro-drop language, and so it is the norm to omit subject pronouns when not needed for contrast or emphasis. The subject, if specified, can easily be something other than these pronouns. For example, él, ella, or usted can be replaced by a noun phrase, or the verb can appear with impersonal se and no subject (e.g. Aquí se vive bien, 'One lives well here'). The first-person plural expressions nosotros, nosotras, tú y yo, or él y yo can be replaced by a noun phrase that includes the speaker (e.g. Los estudiantes tenemos hambre, 'We students are hungry'). The same comments hold for vosotros and ellos.

== Regular verbs ==
=== -ar conjugation (amar, 'to love') ===
Non-finite	Form
Infinitive	amar
Gerund	amando
Past participle	amado (amado, amada, amados, amadas — masc. sing., fem. sing., masc. pl., fem. pl., respectively)
Indicative	yo	tú	vos	él / ella / usted	nosotros / nosotras	vosotros / vosotras	ellos / ellas / ustedes
Present	amo	amas	amás	ama	amamos	amáis	aman
Imperfect	amaba	amabas		amaba	amábamos	amabais	amaban
Preterite	amé	amaste	amastes / amaste	amó	amamos	amasteis	amaron
Future	amaré	amarás		amará	amaremos	amaréis	amarán
Conditional	amaría	amarías		amaría	amaríamos	amaríais	amarían
Subjunctive	yo	tú	vos	él / ella / usted	nosotros / nosotras	vosotros / vosotras	ellos / ellas / ustedes
Present	ame	ames	amés / ames	ame	amemos	améis	amen
Imperfect 1	amara	amaras		amara	amáramos	amarais	amaran
Imperfect 2	amase	amases		amase	amásemos	amaseis	amasen
Future	amare	amares		amare	amáremos	amareis	amaren
Imperative	yo	tú	vos	usted	nosotros / nosotras	vosotros / vosotras	ustedes
Affirmative	—	ama	amá	ame	amemos	amad	amen
Negative	—	no ames	no amés / no ames	no ame	no amemos	no améis	no amen

=== -er conjugation (temer, 'to fear') ===
Non-finite	Form
Infinitive	temer
Gerund	temiendo
Past participle	temido (temido, temida, temidos, temidas — masc. sing., fem. sing., masc. pl., fem pl., respectively)
Indicative	yo	tú	vos	él / ella / usted	nosotros / nosotras	vosotros / vosotras	ellos / ellas / ustedes
Present	temo	temes	temés	teme	tememos	teméis	temen
Imperfect	temía	temías		temía	temíamos	temíais	temían
Preterite	temí	temiste	temistes / temiste	temió	temimos	temisteis	temieron
Future	temeré	temerás		temerá	temeremos	temeréis	temerán
Conditional	temería	temerías		temería	temeríamos	temeríais	temerían
Subjunctive	yo	tú	vos	él / ella / usted	nosotros / nosotras	vosotros / vosotras	ellos / ellas / ustedes
Present	tema	temas	temás / temas	tema	temamos	temáis	teman
Imperfect 1	temiera	temieras		temiera	temiéramos	temierais	temieran
Imperfect 2	temiese	temieses		temiese	temiésemos	temieseis	temiesen
Future	temiere	temieres		temiere	temiéremos	temiereis	temieren
Imperative	yo	tú	vos	usted	nosotros / nosotras	vosotros / vosotras	ustedes
Affirmative	—	teme	temé	tema	temamos	temed	teman
Negative	—	no temas	no temás / no temas	no tema	no temamos	no temáis	no teman

=== -ir conjugation (partir, 'to split/depart') ===
Non-finite	Form
Infinitive	partir
Gerund	partiendo
Past participle	partido (partido, partida, partidos, partidas — masc. sing., fem. sing., masc. pl., fem pl., respectively)
Indicative	yo	tú	vos	él / ella / usted	nosotros / nosotras	vosotros / vosotras	ellos / ellas / ustedes
Present	parto	partes	partís	parte	partimos	partís	parten
Imperfect	partía	partías		partía	partíamos	partíais	partían
Preterite	partí	partiste	partistes / partiste	partió	partimos	partisteis	partieron
Future	partiré	partirás		partirá	partiremos	partiréis	partirán
Conditional	partiría	partirías		partiría	partiríamos	partiríais	partirían
Subjunctive	yo	tú	vos	él / ella / usted	nosotros / nosotras	vosotros / vosotras	ellos / ellas / ustedes
Present	parta	partas	partás / partas	parta	partamos	partáis	partan
Imperfect 1	partiera	partieras		partiera	partiéramos	partierais	partieran
Imperfect 2	partiese	partieses		partiese	partiésemos	partieseis	partiesen
Future	partiere	partieres		partiere	partiéremos	partiereis	partieren
Imperative	yo	tú	vos	usted	nosotros / nosotras	vosotros / vosotras	ustedes
Affirmative	—	parte	partí	parta	partamos	partid	partan
Negative	—	no partas	no partás / no partas	no parta	no partamos	no partáis	no partan

== Irregular verbs ==
=== ser, 'to be (in essence)' ===
This is an Oy-Yo verb. Stem: s-, fu-, er-, se-.

There are two ways to say "To be" in Spanish: ser and estar. They both mean "to be", but they are used in different ways. As a rule of thumb, ser is used to describe permanent or almost permanent conditions and estar to describe temporary ones.

Non-finite	Form
Infinitive	ser
Gerund	siendo
Past participle	sido (never used as adjective)
Indicative	yo	tú	vos	él / ella / usted	nosotros / nosotras	vosotros / vosotras	ellos / ellas / ustedes
Present	soy	eres	sos	es	somos	sois	son
Imperfect	era	eras		era	éramos	erais	eran
Preterite	fui	fuiste	fuistes / fuiste	fue	fuimos	fuisteis	fueron
Future	seré	serás		será	seremos	seréis	serán
Conditional	sería	serías		sería	seríamos	seríais	serían
Subjunctive	yo	tú	vos	él / ella / usted	nosotros / nosotras	vosotros / vosotras	ellos / ellas / ustedes
Present	sea	seas	seás / seas	sea	seamos	seáis	sean
Imperfect 1	fuera	fueras		fuera	fuéramos	fuerais	fueran
Imperfect 2	fuese	fueses		fuese	fuésemos	fueseis	fuesen
Future	fuere	fueres		fuere	fuéremos	fuereis	fueren
Imperative	yo	tú	vos	usted	nosotros / nosotras	vosotros / vosotras	ustedes
Affirmative	—	sé	sé	sea	seamos	sed	sean
Negative	—	no seas	no seás / no seas	no sea	no seamos	no seáis	no sean

=== estar, 'to be (in a state)' ===
This is an Oy-Yo verb. Stem: esta-, estoy, este-, estu- (a-u).

Non-finite	Form
Infinitive	estar
Gerund	estando
Past participle	estado (never used as adjective)
Indicative	yo	tú	vos	él / ella / usted	nosotros / nosotras	vosotros / vosotras	ellos / ellas / ustedes
Present	estoy	estás		está	estamos	estáis	están
Imperfect	estaba	estabas		estaba	estábamos	estabais	estaban
Preterite	estuve	estuviste	estuvistes / estuviste	estuvo	estuvimos	estuvisteis	estuvieron
Future	estaré	estarás		estará	estaremos	estaréis	estarán
Conditional	estaría	estarías		estaría	estaríamos	estaríais	estarían
Subjunctive	yo	tú	vos	él / ella / usted	nosotros / nosotras	vosotros / vosotras	ellos / ellas / ustedes
Present	esté	estés		esté	estemos	estéis	estén
Imperfect 1	estuviera	estuvieras		estuviera	estuviéramos	estuvierais	estuvieran
Imperfect 2	estuviese	estuvieses		estuviese	estuviésemos	estuvieseis	estuviesen
Future	estuviere	estuvieres		estuviere	estuviéremos	estuviereis	estuvieren
Imperative	yo	tú	vos	usted	nosotros / nosotras	vosotros / vosotras	ustedes
Affirmative	—	está/estate	está	esté	estemos	estad	estén
Negative	—	no estés	no estés	no esté	no estemos	no estéis	no estén

=== haber, 'to have (aux.)' ===
Stem: hab-, h-, habr-, hay-, hub- (a-u).

Non-finite	Form
Infinitive	haber
Gerund	habiendo
Past participle	habido (rarely used as adjective)
Indicative	yo	tú	vos	él / ella / usted	nosotros / nosotras	vosotros / vosotras	ellos / ellas / ustedes
Present	he	has		ha, hay	hemos / habemos	habéis	han
Imperfect	había	habías		había	habíamos	habíais	habían
Preterite	hube	hubiste	hubistes / hubiste	hubo	hubimos	hubisteis	hubieron
Future	habré	habrás		habrá	habremos	habréis	habrán
Conditional	habría	habrías		habría	habríamos	habríais	habrían
Subjunctive	yo	tú	vos	él / ella / usted	nosotros / nosotras	vosotros / vosotras	ellos / ellas / ustedes
Present	haya	hayas	hayás / hayas	haya	hayamos	hayáis	hayan
Imperfect 1	hubiera	hubieras		hubiera	hubiéramos	hubierais	hubieran
Imperfect 2	hubiese	hubieses		hubiese	hubiésemos	hubieseis	hubiesen
Future	hubiere	hubieres		hubiere	hubiéremos	hubiereis	hubieren
Imperative (only Old Spanish)	yo	tú	vos	usted	nosotros / nosotras	vosotros / vosotras	ustedes
Affirmative	—	hé	hé	haya	hayamos	habed	hayan
Negative	—	no hayas	no hayás / no hayas	no haya	no hayamos	no hayáis	no hayan

=== tener, 'to have (possession)' ===
This is a diphthonging G-Verb. Stem: te-, teng-, tie-, tu (e-u).

Non-finite	Form
Infinitive	tener
Gerund	teniendo
Past participle	tenido (tenido, tenida, tenidos, tenidas ) — masc. sing., fem. sing., masc. pl., fem pl., respectively)
Indicative	yo	tú	vos	él / ella / usted	nosotros / nosotras	vosotros / vosotras	ellos / ellas / ustedes
Present	tengo	tienes	tenés	tiene	tenemos	tenéis	tienen
Imperfect	tenía	tenías		tenía	teníamos	teníais	tenían
Preterite	tuve	tuviste	tuvistes / tuviste	tuvo	tuvimos	tuvisteis	tuvieron
Future	tendré	tendrás		tendrá	tendremos	tendréis	tendrán
Conditional	tendría	tendrías		tendría	tendríamos	tendríais	tendrían
Subjunctive	yo	tú	vos	él / ella / usted	nosotros / nosotras	vosotros / vosotras	ellos / ellas / ustedes
Present	tenga	tengas	tengás / tengas	tenga	tengamos	tengáis	tengan
Imperfect 1	tuviera	tuvieras		tuviera	tuviéramos	tuvierais	tuvieran
Imperfect 2	tuviese	tuvieses		tuviese	tuviésemos	tuvieseis	tuviesen
Future	tuviere	tuvieres		tuviere	tuviéremos	tuviereis	tuvieren
Imperative	yo	tú	vos	usted	nosotros / nosotras	vosotros / vosotras	ustedes
Affirmative	—	ten	tené	tenga	tengamos	tened	tengan
Negative	—	no tengas	no tengás / no tengas	no tenga	no tengamos	no tengáis	no tengan

=== ir, 'to go' ===
This is an Oy-Yo verb. Stem: i-, y-, v-, fu-.

Non-finite	Form
Infinitive	ir
Gerund	yendo
Past participle	ido (rarely used as adjective)
Indicative	yo	tú	vos	él / ella / usted	nosotros / nosotras	vosotros / vosotras	ellos / ellas / ustedes
Present	voy	vas		va	vamos	vais	van
Imperfect	iba	ibas		iba	íbamos	ibais	iban
Preterite	fui	fuiste	fuistes / fuiste	fue	fuimos	fuisteis	fueron
Future	iré	irás		irá	iremos	iréis	irán
Conditional	iría	irías		iría	iríamos	iríais	irían
Subjunctive	yo	tú	vos	él / ella / usted	nosotros / nosotras	vosotros / vosotras	ellos / ellas / ustedes
Present	vaya	vayas	vayás / vayas	vaya	vayamos	vayáis	vayan
Imperfect 1	fuera	fueras		fuera	fuéramos	fuerais	fueran
Imperfect 2	fuese	fueses		fuese	fuésemos	fueseis	fuesen
Future	fuere	fueres		fuere	fuéremos	fuereis	fueren
Imperative	yo	tú	vos	usted	nosotros / nosotras	vosotros / vosotras	ustedes
Affirmative	—	ve	andá	vaya	vamos	id	vayan
Negative	—	no vayas	no vayás / no vayas	no vaya	no vayamos	no vayáis	no vayan

=== conocer, 'to know (to be acquainted with); to get acquainted with' ===
This is a Zc-verb.

Non-finite	Form
Infinitive	conocer
Gerund	conociendo
Past participle	conocido (conocido, conocida, conocidos, conocidas — masc. sing., fem. sing., masc. pl., fem pl., respectively)
Indicative	yo	tú	vos	él / ella / usted	nosotros / nosotras	vosotros / vosotras	ellos / ellas / ustedes
Present	conozco	conoces	conocés	conoce	conocemos	conocéis	conocen
Imperfect	conocía	conocías		conocía	conocíamos	conocíais	conocían
Preterite	conocí	conociste	conocistes / conociste	conoció	conocimos	conocisteis	conocieron
Future	conoceré	conocerás		conocerá	conoceremos	conoceréis	conocerán
Conditional	conocería	conocerías		conocería	conoceríamos	conoceríais	conocerían
Subjunctive	yo	tú	vos	él / ella / usted	nosotros / nosotras	vosotros / vosotras	ellos / ellas / ustedes
Present	conozca	conozcas	conozcás / conozcas	conozca	conozcamos	conozcáis	conozcan
Imperfect 1	conociera	conocieras		conociera	conociéramos	conocierais	conocieran
Imperfect 2	conociese	conocieses		conociese	conociésemos	conocieseis	conociesen
Future	conociere	conocieres		conociere	conociéremos	conociereis	conocieren
Imperative	yo	tú	vos	usted	nosotros / nosotras	vosotros / vosotras	ustedes
Affirmative	—	conoce	conocé	conozca	conozcamos	conoced	conozcan
Negative	—	no conozcas	no conozcás	no conozca	no conozcamos	no conozcáis	no conozcan

=== conducir, 'to drive' ===
This is a -ducir verb.

Non-finite	Form
Infinitive	conducir
Gerund	conduciendo
Past participle	conducido/a
Indicative	yo	tú	vos	él / ella / usted	nosotros / nosotras	vosotros / vosotras	ellos / ellas / ustedes
Present	conduzco	conduces	conducí	conduce	conducimos	conducís	conducen
Imperfect	conducía	conducías		conducía	conducíamos	conducíais	conducían
Preterite	conduje	condujiste	condujiste	condujo	condujimos	condujisteis	condujeron
Future	conduciré	conducirás		conducirá	conduciremos	conduciréis	conducirán
Conditional	conduciría	conducirías		conduciría	conduciríamos	conduciríais	conducirían
Subjunctive	yo	tú	vos	él / ella / usted	nosotros / nosotras	vosotros / vosotras	ellos / ellas / ustedes
Present	conduzca	conduzcas	conduzcas	conduzca	conduzcamos	conduzcáis	conduzcan
Imperfect 1	condujera	condujeras		condujera	condujeramos	condujerais	condujeran
Imperfect 2	condujese	condujeses		condujese	condujesemos	condujeseis	condujesen
Future	condujere	condujeres		condujere	condujeremos	condujereis	condujeren
Imperative	yo	tú	vos	usted	nosotros / nosotras	vosotros / vosotras	ustedes
Affirmative	—	conduce	conduce	conduzca	conduzcamos	conduced	conduzcan
Negative	—	no conduzcas	no conduzcas	no conduzca	no conduzcamos	no conduzcáis	no conduzcan

== See also ==
- Spanish verbs
