= Pantelleria =

Island of Italy

Pantelleria Pantiḍḍirìa (Sicilian)
- Comune
- Comune di Pantelleria
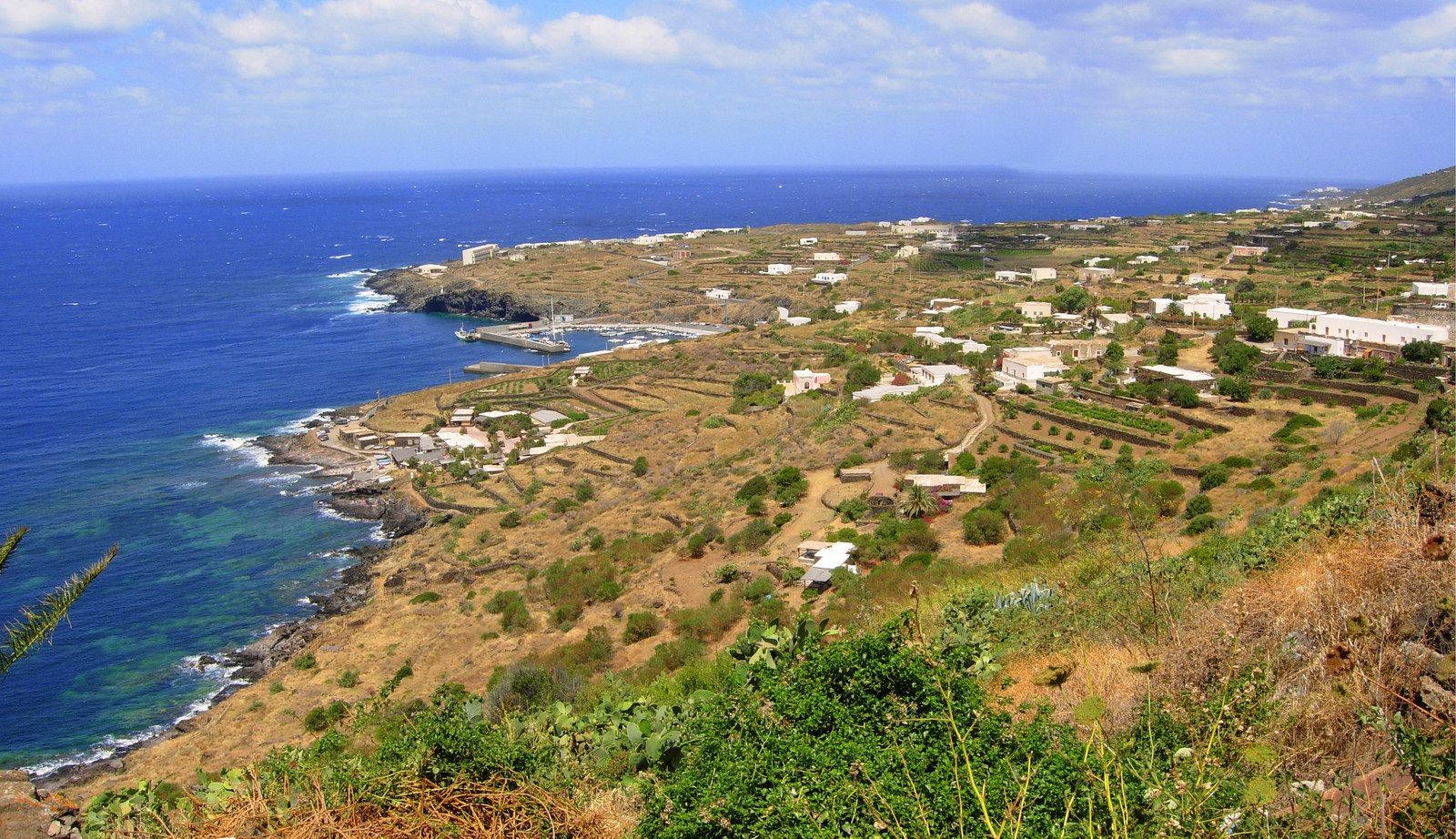
- View of Pantelleria

- Coat of arms

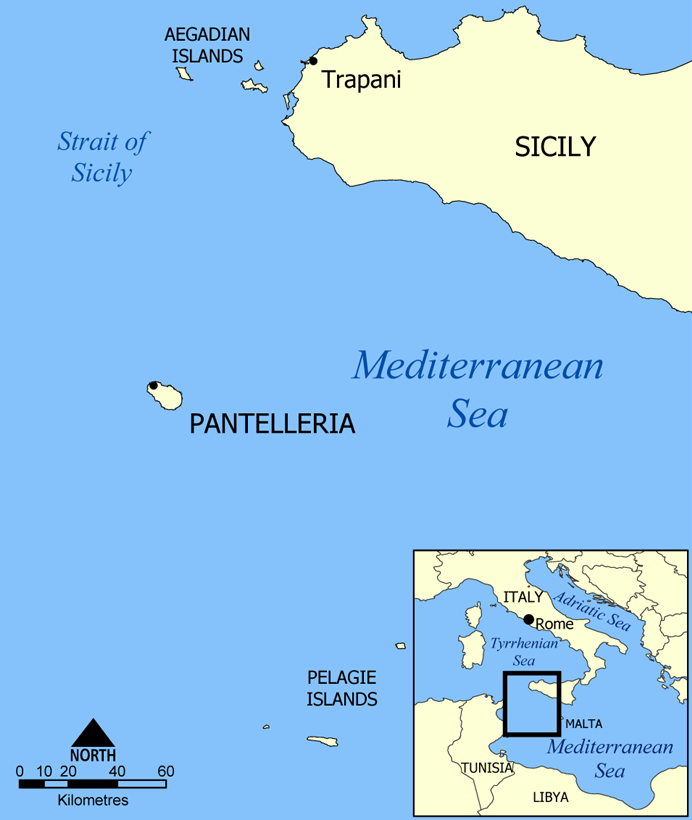

- Location within Sicily Location within Italy
- Coordinates: 36°47′15″N 11°59′33″E
- Country: Italy
- Region: Sicily
- Province: Trapani (TP)
- Frazioni: Kamma, Pantelleria Aeroporto, Scauri, Bagno Dell'Acqua, Bonsulton, Buccaram Di Sopra, Bugeber, Campobello, Contrada Venedise, Cufurà, Gadir, Garitte Karuscia, Khaddiuggia, Khamma Fuori, Località Cimillia, Località Mursia, Località Punta Fram, Località Roncone – Salerno, Località Ziton, Madonna Delle Grazie, Martingana, Mordomo, Penna, San Michele, San Vito, Santa Chiara, Scauri I, Siba – Roncone, Villaggio Tre Pietre

Government
  - Mayor: Vincenzo Vittorio Campo

Area
  - Total: 84.53 km^{2} (32.64 sq mi)
- Elevation: 836 m (2,743 ft)

Population (2026)
  - Total: 7,150
  - Density: 84.6/km^{2} (219/sq mi)
- Demonym: Panteschi
- Time zone: UTC+1 (CET)
  - Summer (DST): UTC+2 (CEST)
- Postal code: 91017
- Dialing code: 0923
- Patron saint: St. Fortunatus
- Saint day: 16 October
- Website: comune.pantelleria.tp.it

Pantelleria (Italian: [pantelleˈriːa]; Sicilian: Pantiḍḍirìa [pandɪɖɖɪˈɾiːa]), known in ancient times as Cossyra or Cossura, is an island and comune (municipality) in the Strait of Sicily in the Mediterranean Sea, 106 kilometres (55 nautical miles) southwest of Sicily and 68 km (35 nmi) east of the Tunisian coast. Administratively, Pantelleria's comune belongs to the Province of Trapani in the autonomous island region of Sicily in southern Italy. It has 7,150 inhabitants.

With an area of 83 km^{2} (32 sq mi), Pantelleria is the largest volcanic satellite island of Sicily. The last eruption occurred below sea level in 1891, and today phenomena related to volcanic activity are present, such as hot springs and fumaroles. The highest peak, the Montagna Grande, reaches 836 m (2,743 ft) above sea level. The islanders speak Pantesco, a dialect of Sicilian influenced by Arabic.

Specchio di Venere lake is a soda lake.

On clear days, Tunisia is visible from the island.

== Names ==
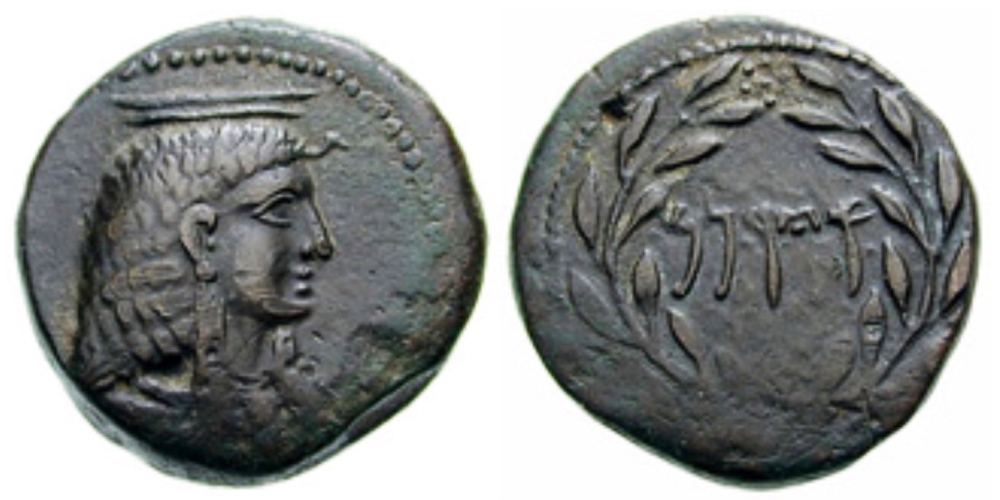
3rd century B.C. Cossura bronze coin showing a portrait of Isis with Punic legend (23 mm, 12.18 g)

The Carthaginians knew the island as yrnm (Punic: 𐤉𐤓𐤍𐤌) or ʾyrnm (𐤀𐤉𐤓𐤍𐤌).

The Greek geographers recorded it as Kossyra (Ancient Greek: Κόσσυρα) and Kossyros (Κόσσυρος), which became the Latin Cossura. This appears in Arabic as Qawṣirah (قوصرة) and Maltese as the former name Qawsra.

The original Arab name for the island was Bint al-Riyāḥ (Arabic: بنت الرياح and Maltese: Bint l-Irjieħ), meaning "Daughter of the Winds" after the strong gales that can arise off the north coast of Africa.

Its Sicilian name is Pantiddirìa, which gave rise to the present Maltese name Pantellerija.

== History ==
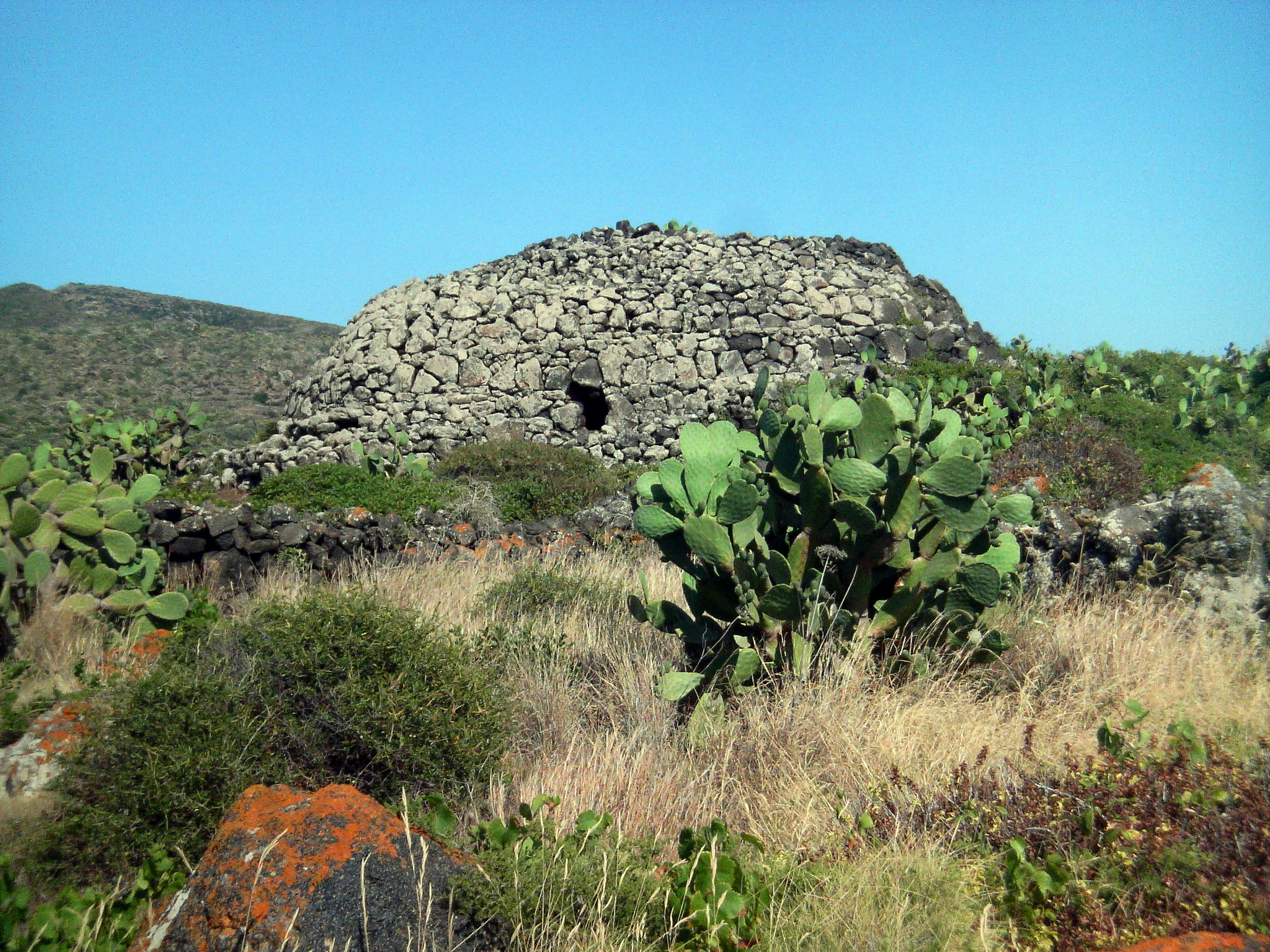
One of the sesi (burial tombs) on Pantelleria.

The earliest evidence of human activity dates to the Neolithic, where it appears visitors to the island would arrive temporarily in order to extract obsidian for dispersion elsewhere in the central Mediterranean. The earliest permanent settlement would not begin until the Bronze Age, with the primary site, Mursia, being the only settlement known from the period. The iconic Sesi, megalithic multi-burial structures, would be built during this period as well.

After a considerable period where the island remained uninhabited, the Carthaginians took possession of it, no doubt owing to its importance as a station on the way to Sicily. This probably occurred around the beginning of the 7th century BC. Their acropolis was the twin hill of San Marco and Santa Teresa, 2 km (1 1/4 mi) south of the present town of Pantelleria. The town has considerable remains of walls made of rectangular blocks of masonry and also of a number of cisterns. Punic tombs have been discovered, and the votive terra-cottas of a small sanctuary of the Punic period were found near the north coast.

The Romans occupied the island as the Fasti Triumphales record in 255 BC, lost it again the next year, and recovered it in 217 BC. It struck bronze coins, originally with a Punic inscription but changing to Latin by the 1st century BC. Under the empire, it served as a place of banishment for prominent persons and members of the imperial family. The town enjoyed municipal rights.

In 700 AD, Arabs conquered the island. In 1123, Roger II of Sicily took the island, and in 1311 an Aragonese fleet under the command of Lluís de Requesens won a considerable victory here. Requesens's family became princes of Pantelleria until 1553, when a Turkish fleet commanded by Dragut sacked the island. A naval battle took place near the island in July 1586 when an armed English merchant fleet of five ships managed to repel an attack by eleven Spanish and Maltese galleys.

A Siculo-Arabic dialect similar to Maltese was the vernacular of the island until the late 18th century, when the Romance Sicilian superseded it. The modern Sicilian language in Pantelleria contains many Arabic loanwords, and most of the island's place names are of Semitic origin.

During the Napoleonic Wars, the British considered the possibility of taking over Pantelleria (together with Lampedusa and Linosa) so as to be able to supply Malta, but a royal commission stated in an 1812 report that there would be considerable difficulties in this venture.

Pantelleria's capture was regarded as crucial to Operation Husky, the Allied invasion of Sicily in 1943 as planes based on Pantelleria could readily reach Sicily. In Operation Corkscrew the Allies bombarded Pantelleria heavily from air and sea in the days before the invasion. The garrison surrendered as the landing troops approached. Pantelleria then became a vital base for Allied aircraft during the assault on Sicily.

In 2018, the Maltese sociologist Godfrey Baldacchino suggested that Malta buy Pantelleria. The way he saw it, this would solve Malta's overcrowding and temper pressure from mass immigration while returning jobs to Pantelleria. Since both islands have semitic elements in their languages and a similar colonial past, Baldacchino thought the purchase would also revive the bonds between them. Pantelleria's mayor responded with a call for commercial partnership, but Maltese citizens and academics on social media largely scoffed at Baldacchino's idea. Opponents feared Malta's dense urban environment would spill over to and defile Pantelleria and that Malta would attract more immigrants, as the Italian island is closer to Africa.

=== Archaeological sites ===
A Middle Bronze Age village was on the west coast, 3 km (2 mi) southeast of the harbour, with a rampart of small blocks of lava, about 7.5 m (25 ft) high, 10 m (33 ft) wide at the base and 5 m (16 ft) at the top, upon the undefended eastern side. Remains of huts were found there, with pottery, tools of obsidian, and other artifacts. These objects are in the museum at Syracuse.

To the southeast, in the district known as the Cunelie, are many tombs, known as sesi. They are similar in character to the nuraghe of Sardinia, though of smaller size, and consist of round or elliptical towers with sepulchral chambers in them, built of rough blocks of lava. Fifty-seven of them can still be traced. The largest is an ellipse of about 18 m × 20 m (59 ft × 66 ft), but most of the sesi have a diameter of only 6–7 m (20–23 ft). The identical character of the pottery found in the sesi with that found in the prehistoric village proves that the former are the tombs of the inhabitants of the latter.

=== Monuments and other buildings ===
The island has scattered typical one-level buildings called dammuso of unknown but probably remote origins. A dammuso is a dry stone building with thick walls that usually appear black due to the extensive use of volcanic rock. They have characteristic domes on top painted white to avoid overheating. The domes collect rainwater that is directed to a large tank (usually below the building) or to the nearby soil for use in the dry season.

Most of the other constructions were destroyed during the Second World War. One notable exception is the castle Barbacane, a renaissance building formed by an irregularly quadrangular plan with internal court joined to a squared base tower.

== Geography ==
=== Geology ===
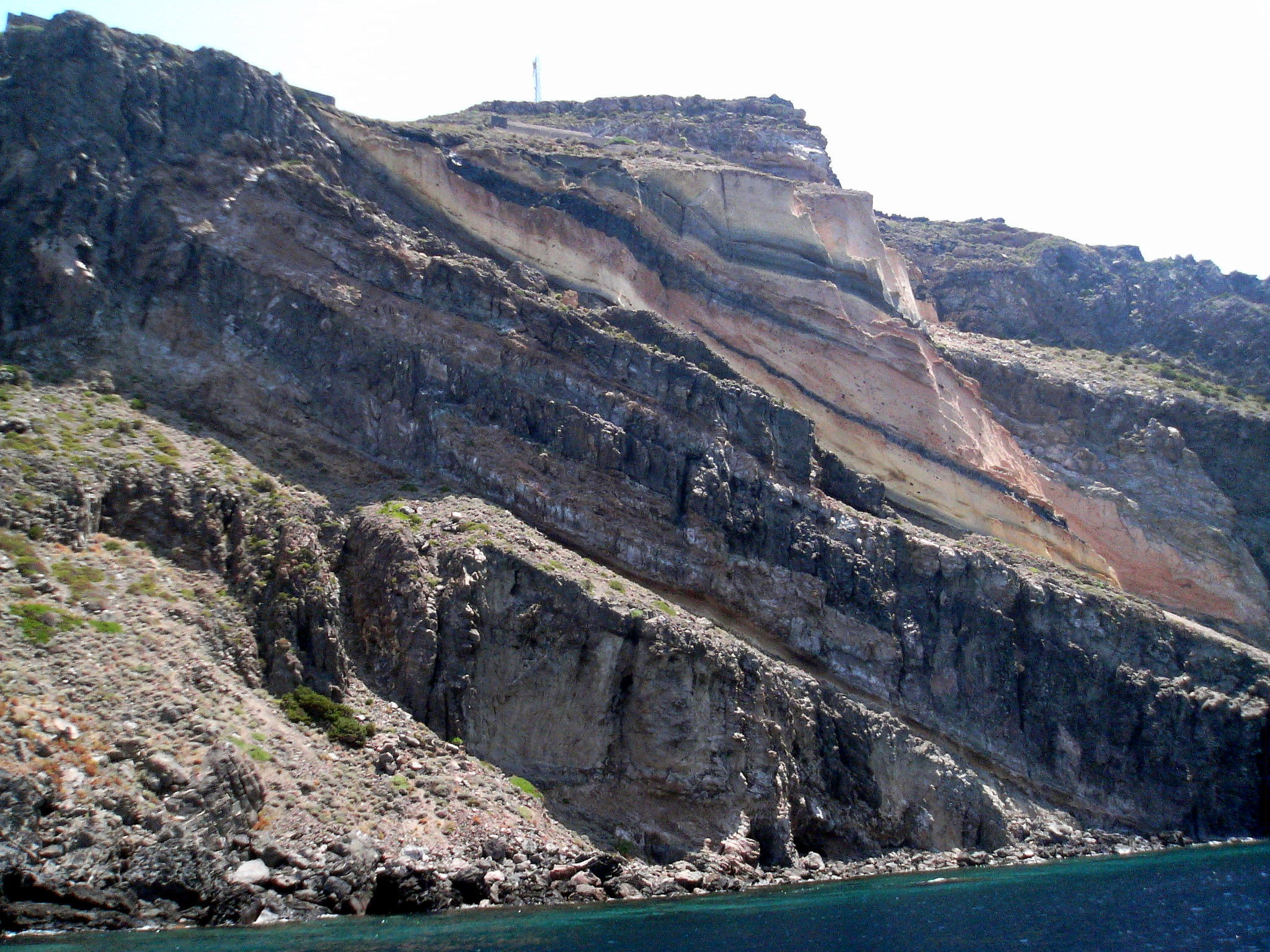
Volcanic rocks in Pantelleria

The island of Pantelleria is located above a drowned continental rift in the Strait of Sicily and has been the focus of intensive volcano-tectonic activity. The 15 kilometre-long (9.3 mi) island is the emergent summit of a largely submarine edifice. Two large Pleistocene calderas dominate the island, the older of the two formed about 114,000 years ago and the younger Cinque Denti caldera formed about 45,000 years ago. The eruption that formed the Cinque Denti caldera produced the distinctive green tuff deposit that covers much of the island, and is found across the Mediterranean, as far away as the island of Lesbos in the Aegean Sea. Holocene eruptions have constructed pumice cones, lava domes, and short, blocky lava flows.

Later activity constructed the cone of Monte Gibele, part of which was subsequently uplifted to form Montagna Grande. Several vents are located on three sides of the uplifted Montagna Grande block on the southeast side of the island. A submarine eruption in 1891 from a vent off the northwest coast is the only confirmed historical activity.

Currently the island is subsiding, and Montagna Grande is slowly sinking. This is thought to be caused by the magma beneath the volcano cooling and degassing. There are numerous hot springs and fumaroles on the island due to an active hydrothermal system. Favara Grande, in the south east of the island, is one of the best examples. The island is releasing a small amount of CO_{2} through passive degassing. Total carbon stock in the first 30 cm (12 in) of soil of Pantelleria is about 230,000 tonnes. The island is the type locality for pantellerite, a peralkaline rhyolite.

=== Environment ===
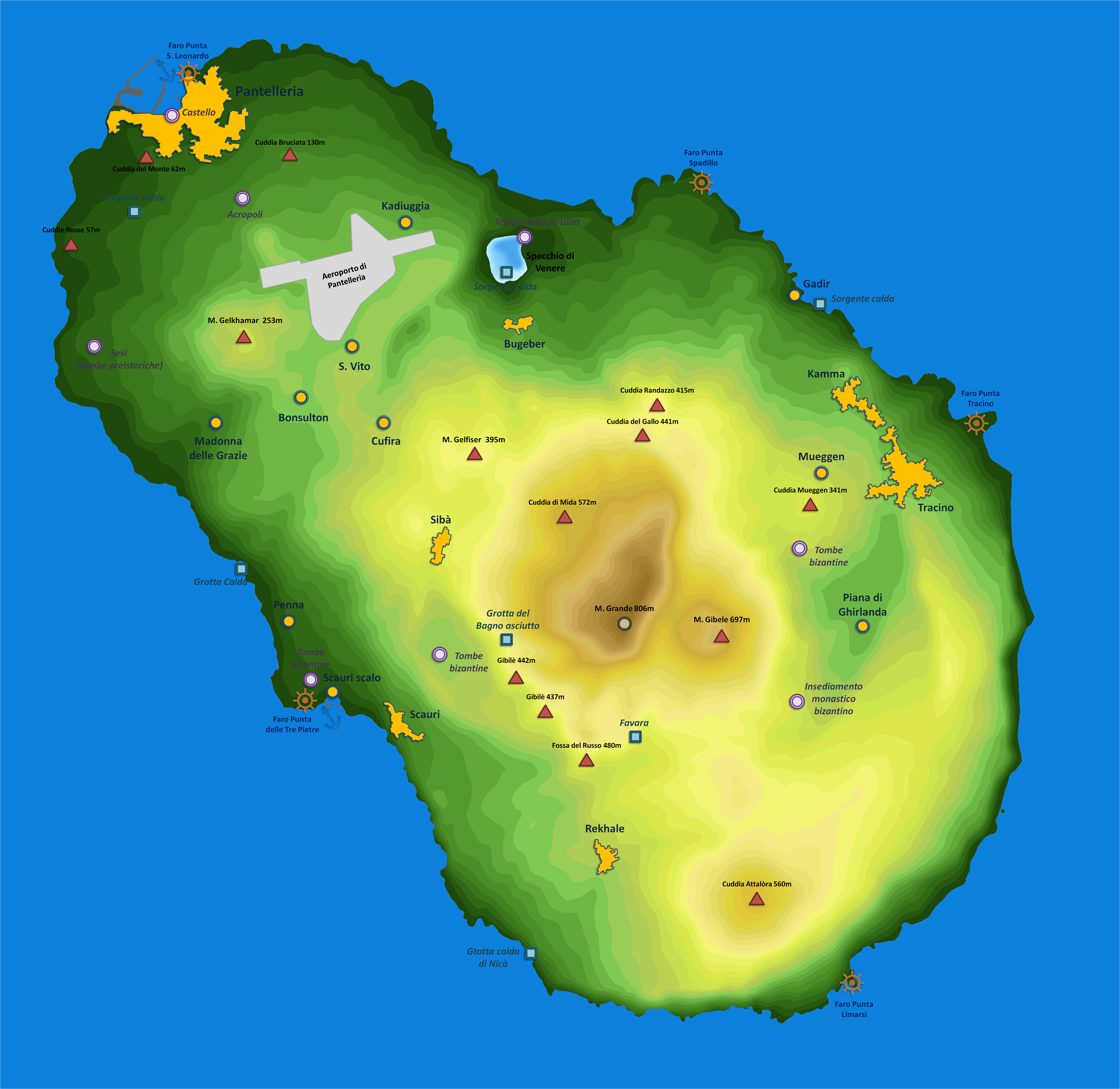
Map of Pantelleria

Pantelleria National Park (Italian: Parco Nazionale dell'Isola di Pantelleria) was established in 2016, and covers an area of 66.4 km^{2} (25 5/8 sq mi), or 80% of the island. Specchio di Venere (literally "Venus' mirror") is a natural lake formed in an extinct volcanic crater, and fed by rain and hot springs. The lake is 12 m (39 ft) deep and is popular for swimming, hot springs, and mud bathing.

Other natural attractions are paths to the sea, a large network of trekking paths, hot springs, and a popular natural sauna fed by vapours filtering through rocks in a small cave. Also situated on the Island is Laghetto delle Ondine ("Pond of the ripples" or "Pond of the wavelets") a seawater lake which has developed into a very desired swimming hole.

The island has been recognised as an Important Bird Area (IBA) by BirdLife International because it supports a population of Eleonora's falcons, with some 35–40 breeding pairs estimated in 1994.

=== Climate ===
Pantelleria has a subtropical Mediterranean climate (Köppen: Csa) characterized by very warm to hot, almost rainless and humid summers, very mild and frost-free winters, a powerful seasonal lag and a small diurnal temperature range. The constant sea breezes moderate the daytime summer temperatures. Coastal Pantelleria (along with Lampedusa, Kasos, Karpathos, Kastellorizo and coastal Malta) is one of the very few areas along the Mediterranean Sea coast that has never recorded frost. Below freezing temperatures and snow only occur, and sporadically, at Montagna Grande and higher elevations on the island. Despite the very dry summers and the fairly low annual precipitation, the dry season is noticeably short at four months, and the more rainy season lasts at least eight months.

Climate data for Pantelleria (1991–2020 normals, extremes 1971–2025)
Month	Jan	Feb	Mar	Apr	May	Jun	Jul	Aug	Sep	Oct	Nov	Dec	Year
Record high °C (°F)	30.6 (87.1)	32.2 (90.0)	30.6 (87.1)	34.0 (93.2)	40.4 (104.7)	42.6 (108.7)	41.4 (106.5)	42.8 (109.0)	40.5 (104.9)	38.8 (101.8)	33.6 (92.5)	30.4 (86.7)	42.8 (109.0)
Mean daily maximum °C (°F)	18.0 (64.4)	19.0 (66.2)	20.6 (69.1)	22.1 (71.8)	24.5 (76.1)	26.4 (79.5)	28.8 (83.8)	29.4 (84.9)	28.4 (83.1)	25.2 (77.4)	22.7 (72.9)	20.3 (68.5)	23.8 (74.8)
Daily mean °C (°F)	16.1 (61.0)	16.9 (62.4)	18.2 (64.8)	19.2 (66.6)	21.6 (70.9)	23.5 (74.3)	25.5 (77.9)	26.3 (79.3)	25.2 (77.4)	22.7 (72.9)	19.6 (67.3)	18.0 (64.4)	21.1 (69.9)
Mean daily minimum °C (°F)	14.2 (57.6)	14.7 (58.5)	15.7 (60.3)	16.3 (61.3)	18.7 (65.7)	20.2 (68.4)	22.1 (71.8)	23.1 (73.6)	22.0 (71.6)	20.2 (68.4)	16.5 (61.7)	15.6 (60.1)	18.3 (64.9)
Record low °C (°F)	3.8 (38.8)	4.0 (39.2)	3.5 (38.3)	7.6 (45.7)	10.4 (50.7)	12.0 (53.6)	16.2 (61.2)	16.0 (60.8)	14.4 (57.9)	10.0 (50.0)	7.0 (44.6)	4.6 (40.3)	3.5 (38.3)
Average precipitation mm (inches)	79.7 (3.14)	63.2 (2.49)	51.8 (2.04)	35.1 (1.38)	15.2 (0.60)	8.5 (0.33)	2.9 (0.11)	7.8 (0.31)	22.3 (0.88)	61.7 (2.43)	83.3 (3.28)	82.1 (3.23)	513.6 (20.22)
Average precipitation days (≥ 1.0 mm)	6.5	5.5	5.1	4.0	2.2	0.6	0.1	0.3	1.9	3.9	6.8	6.6	43.5
Average dew point °C (°F)	7.9 (46.2)	7.0 (44.6)	8.1 (46.6)	9.9 (49.8)	13.3 (55.9)	16.1 (61.0)	17.5 (63.5)	19.2 (66.6)	17.9 (64.2)	15.6 (60.1)	12.1 (53.8)	9.2 (48.6)	12.8 (55.1)
Mean monthly sunshine hours	155.5	176.2	226.1	258.5	289.2	316.6	349.3	336.4	281.3	226.6	178.7	154.1	2,948.5
Source 1: NOAA (precipitation 1991–2020, sun and dew point 1981–2020)
Source 2: Istituto Superiore per la Protezione e la Ricerca Ambientale

== Demographics ==
Historical population
Year	Pop.	±%
1861	6,181	—
1871	6,989	+13.1%
1881	7,178	+2.7%
1901	8,683	+21.0%
1911	8,697	+0.2%
1921	9,165	+5.4%
1931	9,458	+3.2%
1936	9,806	+3.7%
1951	10,306	+5.1%
1961	9,601	−6.8%
1971	8,327	−13.3%
1981	7,914	−5.0%
1991	7,484	−5.4%
2001	7,224	−3.5%
2011	7,493	+3.7%
2021	7,407	−1.1%
Source: ISTAT

As of 2026, the population is 7,150, of which 50.5% are male, and 49.5% are female. Minors make up 14.3% of the population, and seniors make up 24.2%.

=== Immigration ===
As of 2025, immigrants make up 7.5% of the population. The five largest foreign countries of birth are Romania, Tunisia, Albania, Germany, and Sudan.

== Economy ==
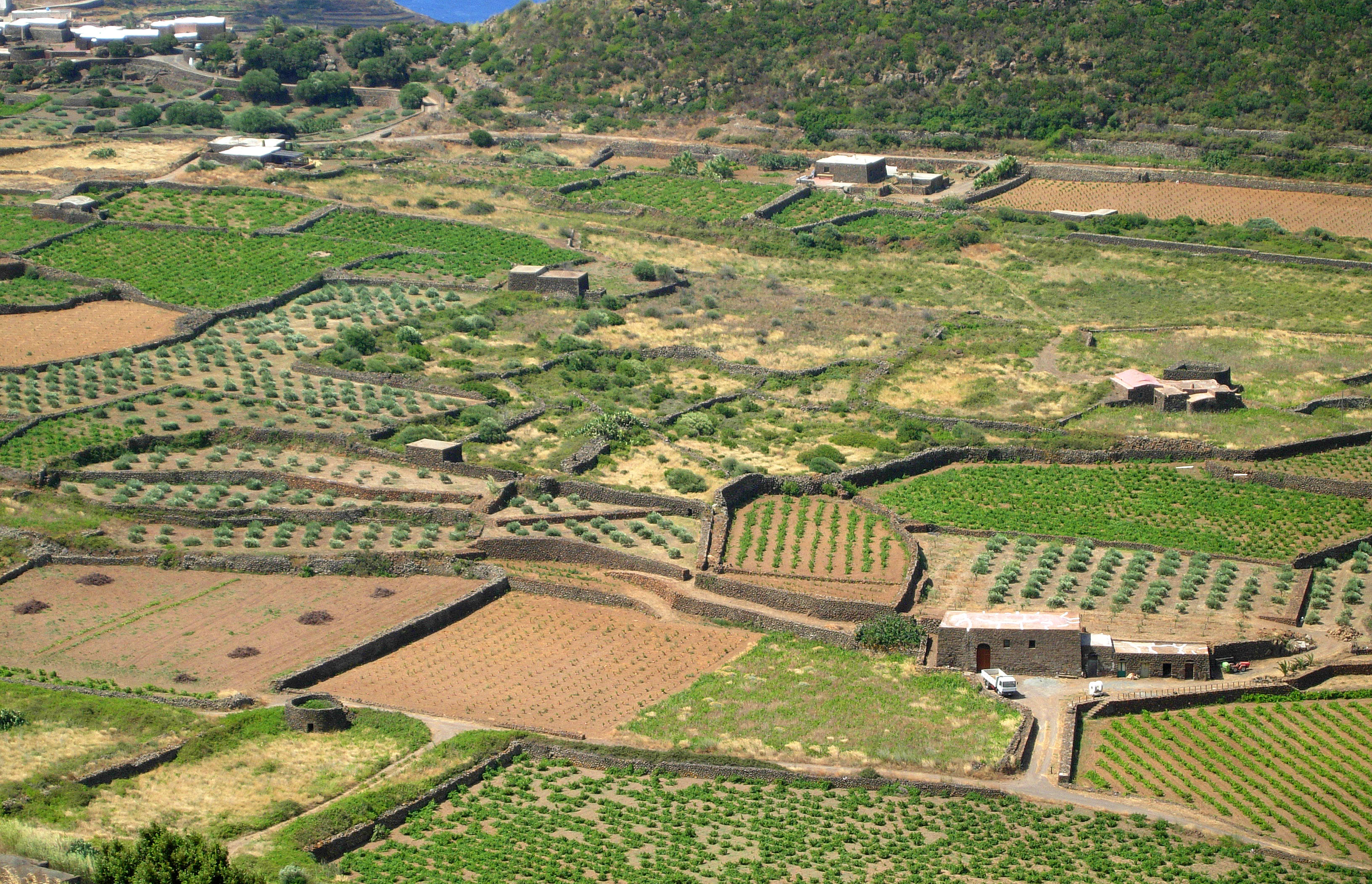
Typical landscape with vineyards

The economy of Pantelleria consists mainly of agriculture and tourism. Pantelleria is noted for its sweet wines, Moscato di Pantelleria and Moscato Passito di Pantelleria, both made from the local Zibibbo grape. In 2014, the traditional agricultural practice of cultivating the vite ad alberello (head-trained bush vines) of the community of Pantelleria was inscribed on the Representative List of the Intangible Cultural Heritage of Humanity of UNESCO.

== Transport ==
The island is served by Pantelleria Airport, which is served by DAT, connecting Trapani and Palermo and other companies in summer, connecting the island with Italian cities such as Milan, Rome, Venice and others. Ferries reach the island from Trapani, and it is near the main east–west route through the Mediterranean Sea.

== Gallery ==
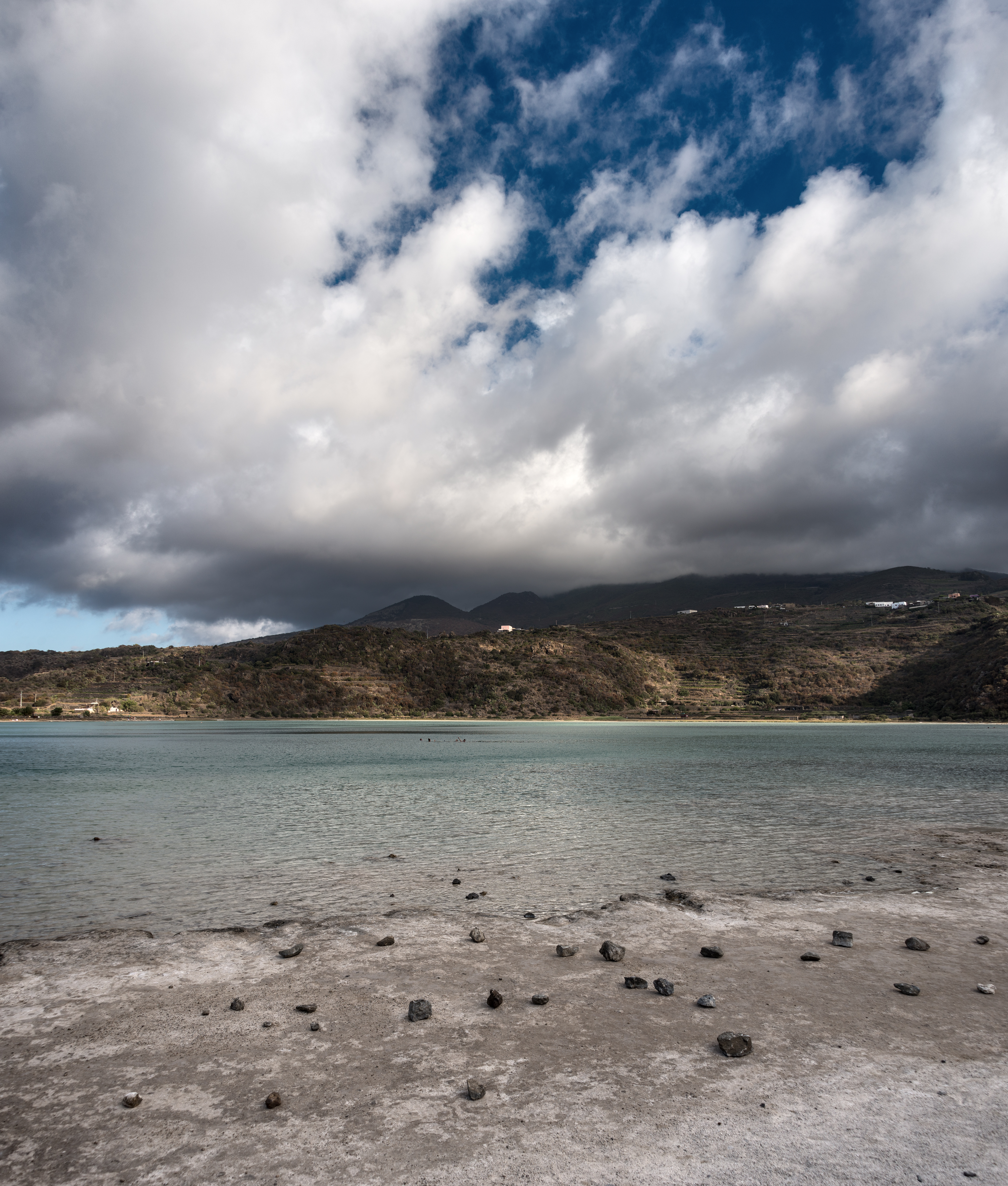
Specchio di Venere (Venus' mirror)

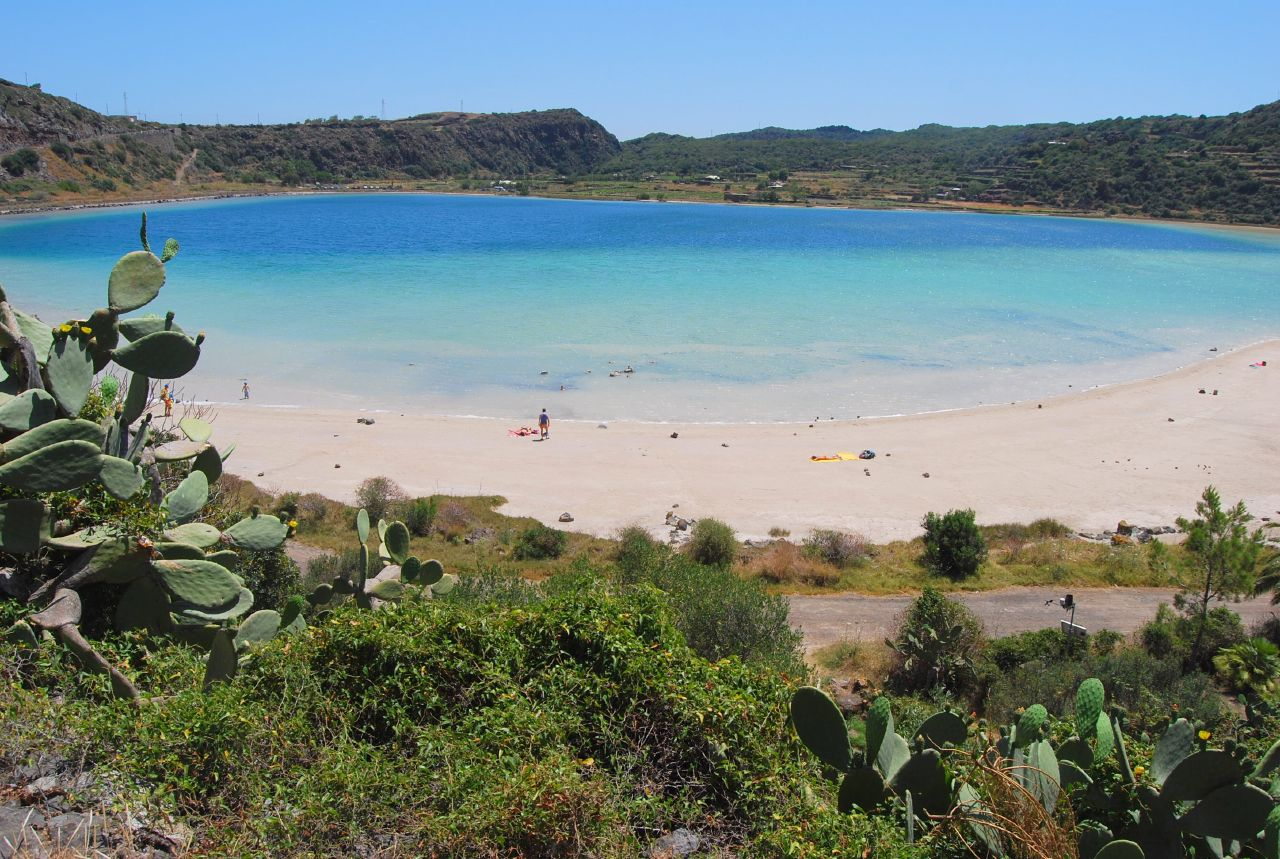
Specchio di Venere (Venus' mirror), a soda lake

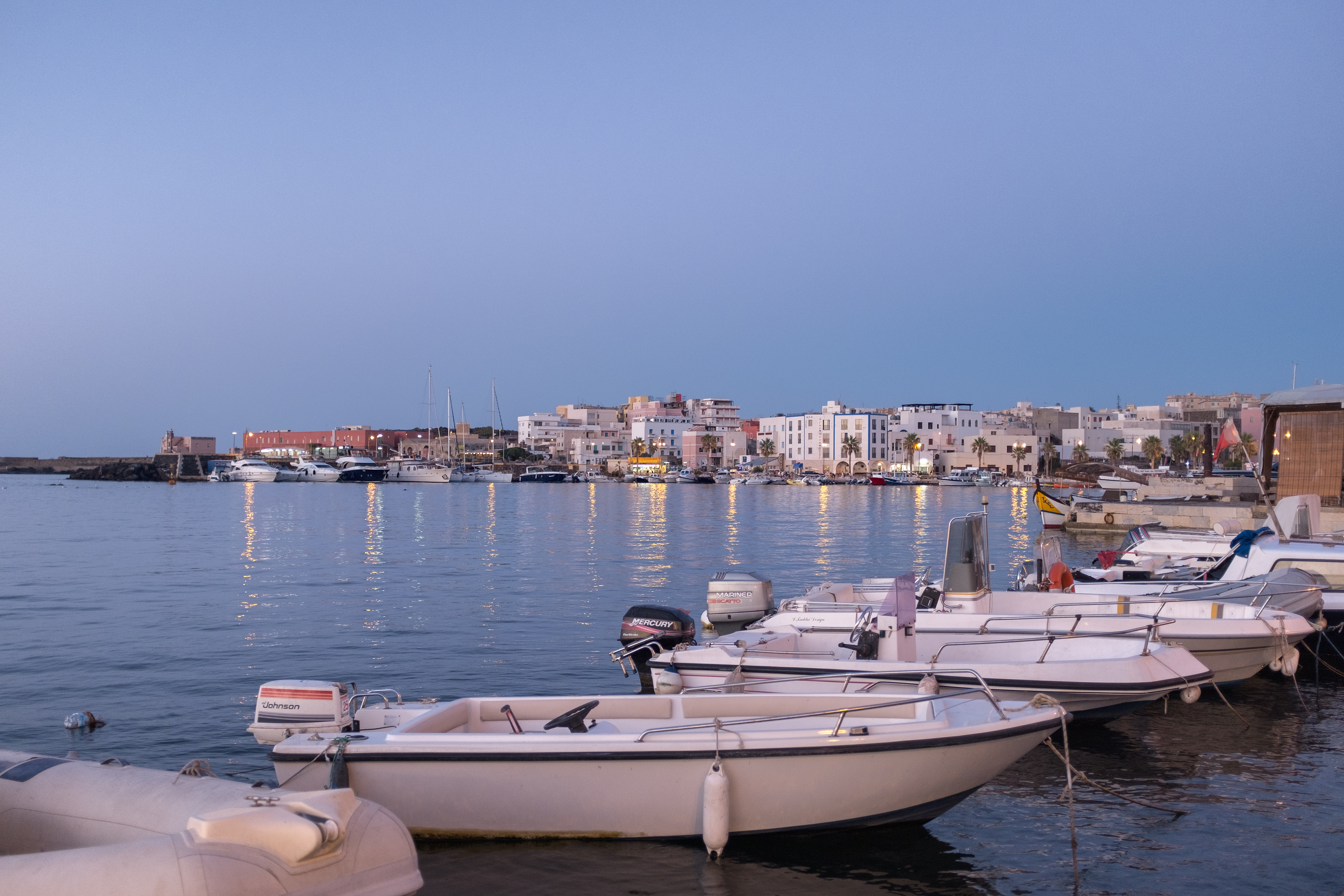
Port

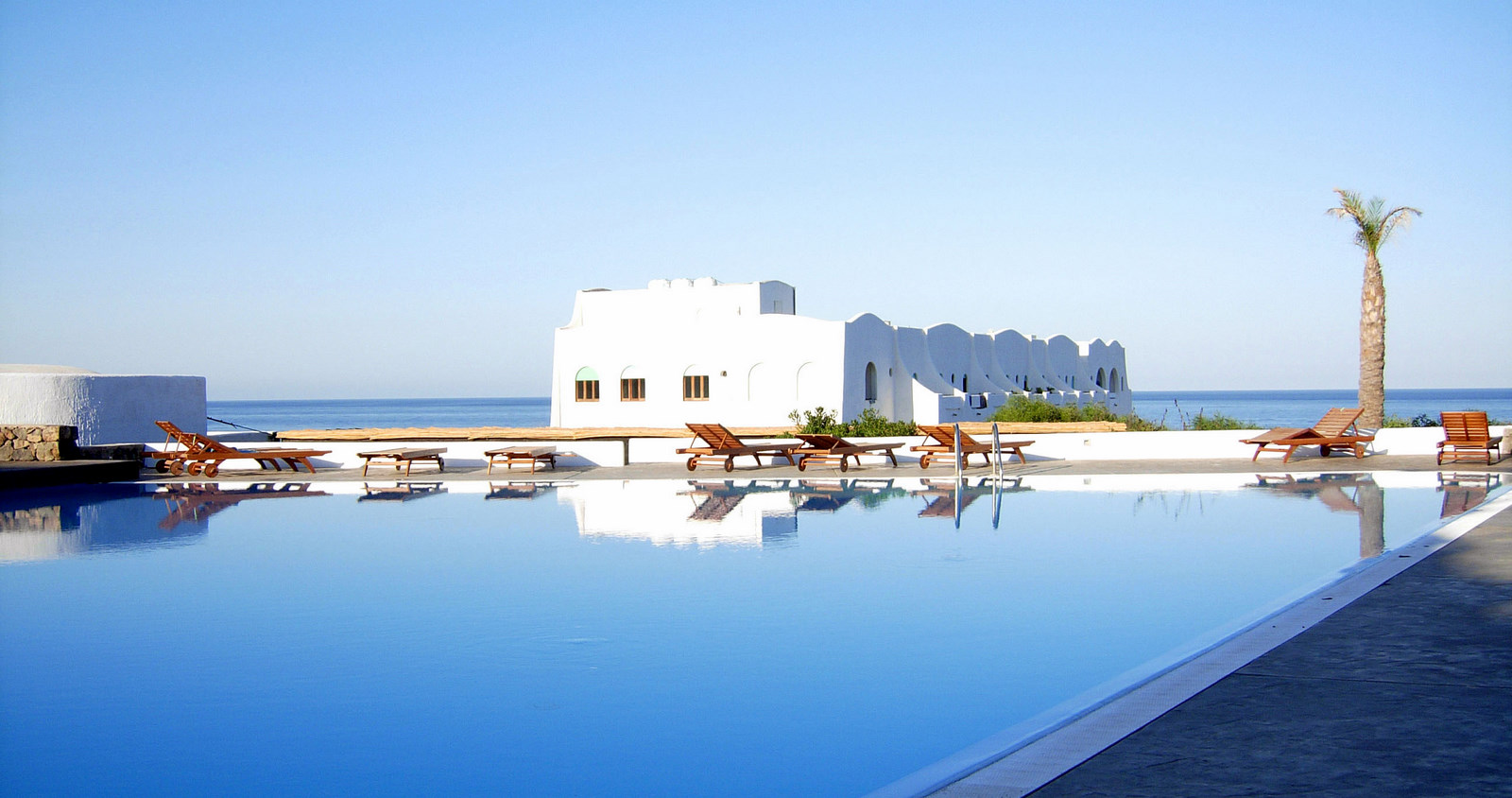
A tourist resort near the sea

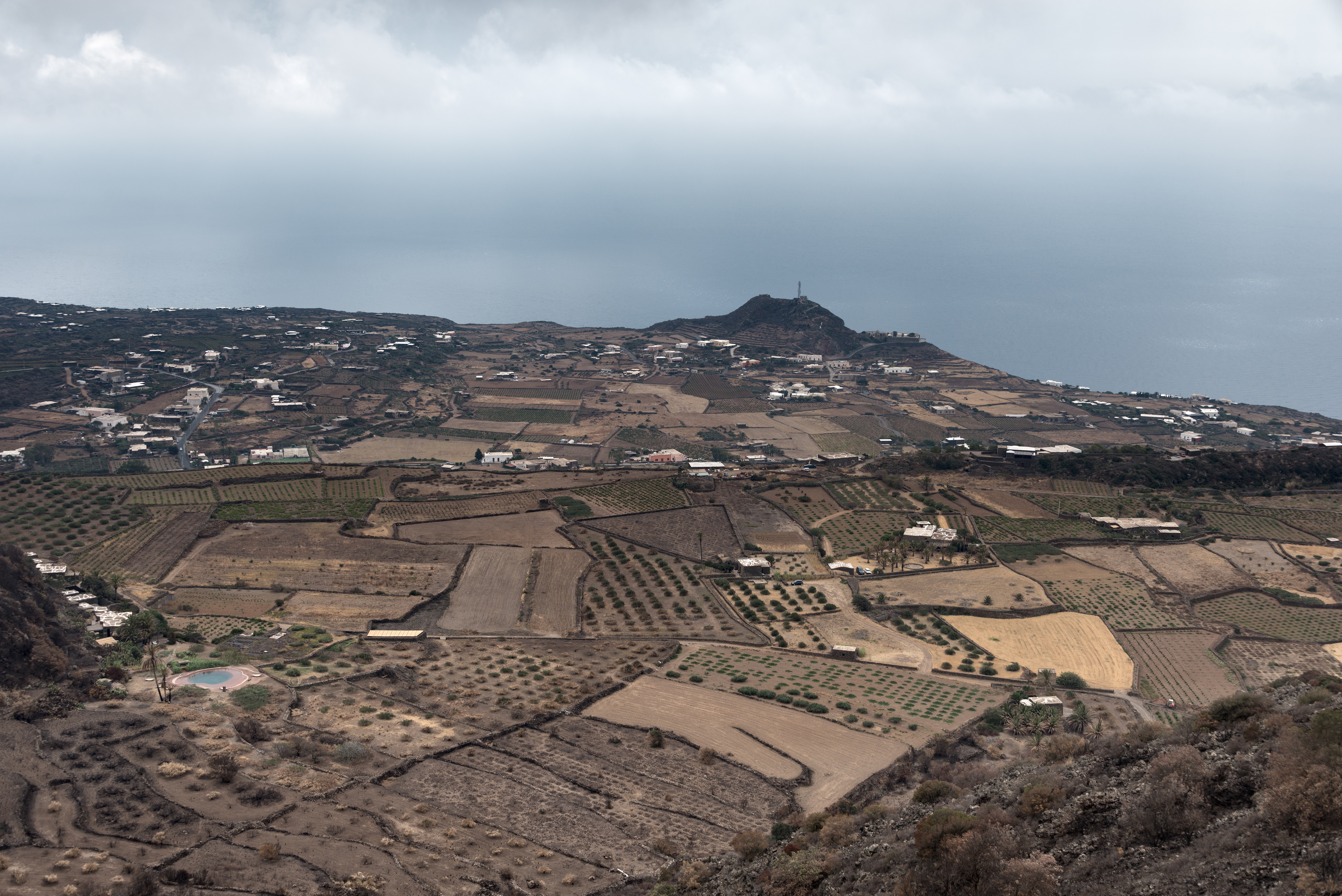
Arid landscape during summer

== See also ==
- List of islands of Italy
- List of volcanoes in Italy
- Italy–Tunisia Delimitation Agreement
