= Lluís de Requesens =

Lluís or Luis de Requesens may refer to:

- Lluís de Requesens (commander), Catalan-Aragonese naval commander
- Luis de Requesens y Relat (died 1469), Catalan baron of Altafulla and La Nou de Gaià
- Luis de Requesens y Zúñiga (1528–1576), Spanish general, sailor, diplomat and politician
