= Continuous and progressive aspects =

Grammatical contrast of present tense verbs

The continuous and progressive aspects (abbreviated cont and prog) are grammatical aspects that express incomplete action ("to do") or state ("to be") in progress at a specific time: they are non-habitual, imperfective aspects.

In the grammars of many languages the two terms are used interchangeably. This is also the case with English: a construction such as "He is washing" may be described either as present continuous or as present progressive. However, there are certain languages for which two different aspects are distinguished. In Chinese, for example, progressive aspect denotes a current action, as in "he is getting dressed", while continuous aspect denotes a current state, as in "he is wearing fine clothes".

As with other grammatical categories, the precise semantics of the aspects vary from language to language, and from grammarian to grammarian. For example, some grammars of Turkish count the -iyor form as a present tense; some as a progressive tense; and some as both a continuous (nonhabitual imperfective) and a progressive (continuous non-stative) aspect.

== Continuous versus progressive ==
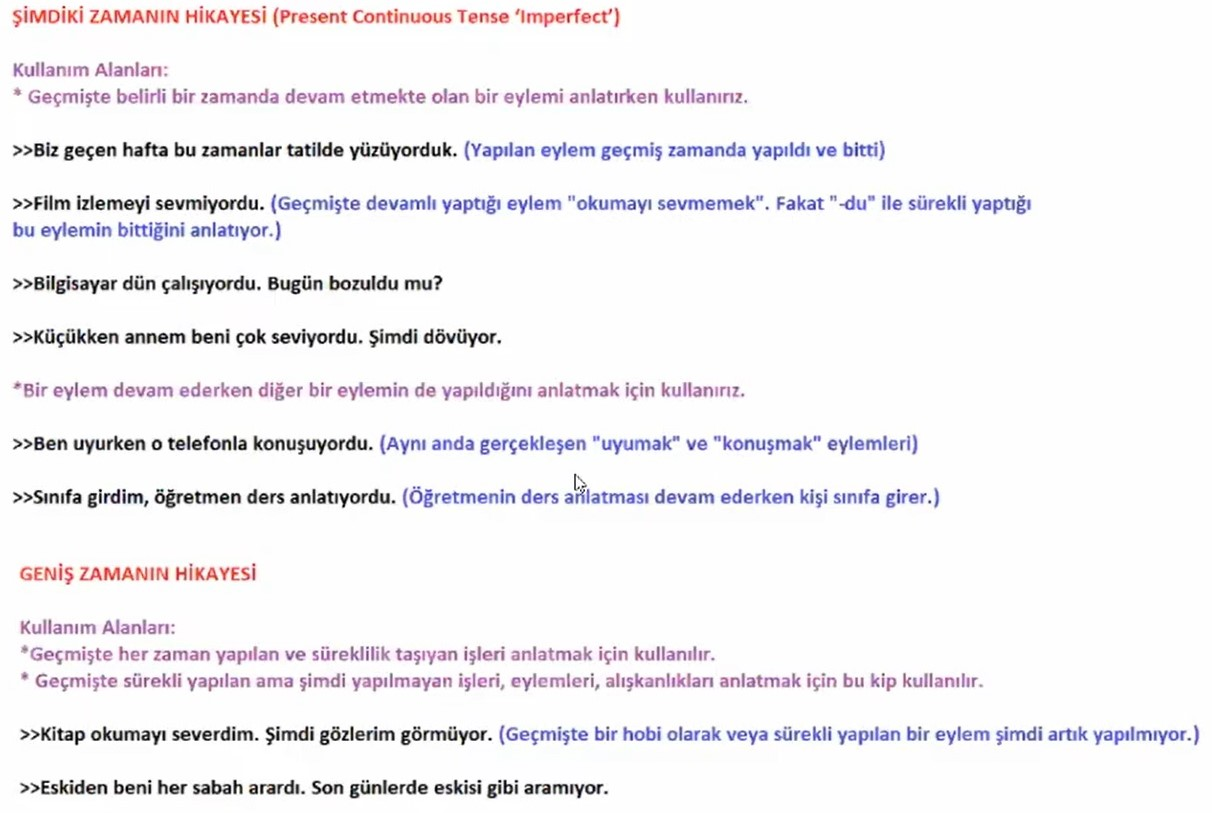
The Past Continuous Tense (Şimdiki Zaman Hikâyesi) in Turkish.

The progressive aspect expresses the dynamic quality of actions that are in progress while the continuous aspect expresses the state of the subject that is continuing the action. For instance, "Tom is reading" can express dynamic activity: "Tom is reading a book" – i.e. right now (progressive aspect), or Tom's current state: "Tom is reading for a degree" – i.e. Tom is a student (continuous aspect). The aspect can often be ambiguous; "Tom is reading Ulysses" may describe his current activity (it's in his hand), or the state of having started, but not yet finished, the book (it's in his bag).

== Continuous and progressive in various languages ==
Unless otherwise indicated, the following languages treat continuous and progressive aspects the same, in which case the term continuous is used to refer to both.

=== English ===
==== Use ====
The continuous aspect is constructed by using a form of the copula, "to be", together with the present participle (marked with the suffix -ing). It is generally used for actions that are occurring at the time in question, and does not focus on the larger time-scale. For example, the sentence "Andrew was playing tennis when Jane called him." indicates what Andrew was doing when Jane called him, but does not indicate for how long Andrew played, nor how often he plays; for that, the simple past would suffice: "Andrew played tennis three hours every day for several years."

Salikoko Mufwene contrasts the effect of the progressive form on the meanings of action verbs versus those of lexically stative verbs:

1. [I]t converts events expected to be punctual into longer-lasting, even if transient, states of affairs [e.g., "Nancy is writing a letter"];
2. it [con]versely converts those states of affairs expected to last long (lexical statives) to shorter-lasting / transient states of affairs [e.g., "Tom is living with us"]; and
3. it simply presents those verbs whose denotations are neutral with regard to duration as in process / in (transient) duration [e.g., "The wall is cracking"], though duration is most expected of statives.

==== Origin ====
The progressive aspect in English likely arose from two constructions that were used fairly rarely in Old and Early Middle English. The first used a form of beon/wesan (to be/to become) with a present participle (-ende). This construction has an analogous form in Dutch (see below). The second used beon/wesan, a preposition, and a gerund (-unge), and has been variously proposed as being influenced by similar forms in Latin and French or British Celtic, though evidence one way or another is scant. Over the course of the Middle English period, sound shifts in the language meant that the (-ende) participle ending and the (-unge) gerund ending merged into a new ending, (-ing). This change, which was complete in southern England around the late fifteenth century and spread north from there, rendered participles and gerunds indistinguishable. It is at this point that a sudden increase in the use of progressive forms is visible, though they would not take their current form until the eighteenth century. Linguist Herbert Schendl has concluded that "with this feature, a polygenetic origin ... seems attractive, and at least the further extension of the progressive is a language-internal development."

=== Berber ===
In the Amazigh language, past continuous is formed by using the fixed participle ttugha; ttugha is added before the verb that is in the present tense. So we have:

Ntta itari: he writes / he is writing

Ntta ttugha itari: he was writing

Present continuous is usually the same as the present tense. But in the Riff variety of Berber, the participle aqqa is added before the verb to form present continuous.

=== Chinese ===
Chinese is one family of languages that makes a distinction between the continuous and progressive aspects.

==== Cantonese ====
Cantonese marks both aspects with verb suffixes. gan^{2} 緊 is typically used to express progressive aspect, while zyu^{6} 住 is used to express continuous aspect. Take the following example:

| | Example |
|---|---|
| Progressive | 我 著 緊 衫。 I wear PROG clothes I am putting on clothes. |
| Continuous | 我 著 住 衫。 I wear CONT clothes I am wearing clothes. |

In the example, the progressive aspect expresses the fact that the subject is actively putting on clothes rather than merely wearing them as in the continuous aspect. This example is useful for showing English speakers the difference between continuous and progressive because "wearing" in English never conveys the progressive aspect. (Instead, "putting on" must be used).

In Cantonese, the progressive marker gan^{2} 緊 can express the continuous aspect as well, depending on the context (so the example above could also mean "I'm wearing clothes" in addition to "I'm putting on clothes"), but in general, the progressive aspect is assumed. In order to emphasize the progressive aspect rather than the continuous, hai^{2} dou^{6} 喺度 (literally meaning "at here") can be used in front of the verb:

我 喺度 著 緊 衫。
I {at here} wear PROG clothes

hai^{2} dou^{6} 喺度 can also be used without gan^{2} 緊 to indicate the progressive aspect.

==== Mandarin ====
Mandarin marks the progressive aspect with the pre-verbal auxiliary zài 在, and the continuous aspect with the verb suffix 著/着 zhe. An alternative to zài 在 is zhèngzài 正在, which emphasizes simultaneity and is similar to Cantonese's use of 喺度.

| | Example |
|---|---|
| Progressive | 我 在 穿 衣服。 I {PROG} wear clothes I am putting on clothes. |
| Continuous | 我 穿 著 衣服。 I wear CONT clothes I am wearing clothes. |

For more information see Chinese grammar § Aspects.

=== Danish ===
Danish has several ways of constructing continuous aspect.

- The first is using the form er ved + infinitive ("is at" meaning "in the process of"). For instance han er ved at bygge nyt hus ("he is at to build new house") meaning "he is building a new house". This is similar to the German form using "beim".
- Some verbs are always or default continuous, for instance verbs indicating motion, location or position, such as sidder ("sitting"), står ("standing"), ligger ("lying") or går ("walking"). This means their present tense forms are their continuous forms: Han står dér ("he stands there") means "he is standing over there", and jeg sidder ned ("I sit down"), means "I am sitting". Note this means Danish often has two different forms of simple verbs when they make sense both continuous and non-continuous – English has only one such fully functional pair remaining, and it happens to share this one with Danish at lægge (sig) ("to lay") and at ligge ("to lie") – "Lay down so you can lie down".
- Using these default continuous verbs together with a non-default continuous verb makes both continuous. This is a form also used in other Germanic languages such as Norwegian and Dutch. For instance: Han står og ryger ("he stands and smokes") means "he is smoking (while standing)".
- Another form is used for motions such as walking, driving or flying. When constructing perfect tense they can be constructed with either 'is' or 'has'. Where 'has' indicates a completed travel, and 'is' indicates a started journey. For instance han er gået ("he is walked") meaning "he has left (on foot)", versus jeg har fløjet meaning "I have flown (at some point in time)".

=== Dutch ===
The continuous aspect is commonly used in Dutch, though not as often as in English. There are various methods of forming a continuous:

- One form is the same as in English: zijn (to be) with the present participle, e.g., Het schip is zinkende (The ship is sinking). This form puts stress on the continuous aspect and often gives some dramatic overtone, making it not commonly used.
- The second method is the most common in Dutch. It is formed with zijn, followed by the preposition and definite article aan het and the gerund (verb used as a noun), e.g., Ik ben aan het lezen (literally I am at the reading), meaning I am reading.
- The third method is by using a verb expressing a physical position, like zitten (to sit), staan (to stand), liggen (to lie), followed by te and the infinitive. Examples: Ik zit te lezen (lit. I sit to read), meaning I am reading (while sitting), Ik stond te wachten (lit. I stood to wait), meaning I was waiting (while standing), Zij ligt te slapen (lit. She lies to sleep), meaning She is sleeping (while lying down), Wij lopen te zingen (lit. We walk to sing), meaning We are singing (while walking). When translating into English or another language, the physical position generally isn't mentioned, only the action itself. In English, similar constructions exist but are uncommon and marginally more frequent only in certain dialects, e.g. I sat (there) reading, I stood (there) waiting, etc.
- A fourth method, also available in English, is using zijn (to be) with the adverb and preposition bezig met (busy with) and the gerund, e.g., Ik ben bezig met lezen (lit. I am busy with reading), meaning I am (busy) reading. If there is an object, there are two forms: 1. the gerund is preceded by the neuter article het and followed by the preposition van (of) and the object, e.g. Ik ben bezig met het lezen van deze brief (lit. I am busy with the reading of this letter), meaning I am reading this letter; 2. the object comes before the full infinitive (instead of the gerund), e.g. Ik ben bezig met deze brief te lezen (lit. I am busy with this letter to read), meaning I am reading this letter. This form of the continuous is mostly used for a real (physical) activity. Grammar-wise, it is possible to say zij is bezig te denken (lit. she is busy to think, she is thinking) or hij is bezig te slapen (lit. he is busy to sleep, he is sleeping), but it sounds strange in Dutch. In these cases, other forms of the continuous are generally used, specifically the second method: Zij is aan het denken and hij is aan het slapen.
- A fifth method also involves the use of zijn (to be) with the adverb bezig (busy), this time followed by te and the infinitive, e.g. Ik ben bezig te koken (lit. I am busy to cook), meaning I am cooking. If there is an object, it comes before the verb, e.g. Ik ben bezig aardappelen te koken (lit. I am busy potatoes to cook), meaning I am cooking potatoes. This form is also mainly used for real activities. Zij is bezig te denken and Hij is bezig te slapen are uncommon.
- The sixth method is a special form of the continuous. It implicitly means that the subject is away to do an activity. It uses zijn (to be), followed by the infinitive, e.g., Zij is winkelen (lit. She is shop), meaning She is (away) shopping.

=== French ===
French does not have a continuous aspect per se; events that English would describe using its continuous aspect, French would describe using a neutral aspect. Many express what they are doing in French by just using the present tense. That being said, French can express a continuous sense using the periphrastic construction être en train de ("to be in the middle of") followed by a simple infinitive; for example, English's "we were eating" might be expressed in French either as nous étions en train de manger (literally "we were in the middle of eating"), or as simply nous mangions ("we ate").

An exception is in relating events that took place in the past: the imperfect (or imparfait) has a continuous aspect in relation to the (historic) simple past (or passé simple); e.g. nous mangions quand il frappa à la porte ("we were eating when he knocked at the door"). However, the compound past (passé composé) is more often used to denote past events with a neutral aspect in a non-narrative context.

It is also possible to use the present participle (or participe présent) as a gerund (or gérondif) in relation to the tense of the opposed verb, e.g. Nous mangeant, il frappait à la porte, opposed here to the imperfect but the simple past is also possible, e.g. nous mangeant, il frappa à la porte. In such construction (used without any leading preposition en), the required subject for the gerund verb takes the indirect form when it is a pronoun allowing such distinction, so the normal subjects je/tu/il/ils are changed to moi/toi/lui/eux, e.g. Moi mangeant... instead of ~~Je~~ mangeant..., but Nous mangeant...

If the subject of the gerund is the same as the opposed verb conjugated at any other tense, it is omitted in the progressive gerund, but implied by the preposition en, e.g. en mangeant et nous discutant, il ne nous écoute pas ("while eating and while we are discussing, he doesn't listen to us"). The preposition en may be omitted if the gerund has an implied subject and takes an object which is not a pronoun; in that case the object may be prefixed before the gerund verb (and its possessive may be omitted when it refers to that implied subject), e.g. Chemin faisant, il ne pense à rien (lit. "Path making," i.e. "While making his path", "he doesn't think about anything").

Quebec French and Louisiana French often express a continuous sense using the periphrastic construction être après (lit. "to be after") followed by a simple infinitive; for example, English's "we were eating" might be expressed either as simply nous mangions with the imperfect (imparfait) like in France, or as nous étions après manger; but in France, this could be confusively understood as a discontinuous past (lit. "we were after having eaten", i.e. nous avions mangé "we had eaten"), especially in colloquial oral speech, as if the past infinitive (more commonly used with the preposition après) was changed into a simple infinitive with the omitted auxiliary. Haitian Creole offers a similar construction with the adverb ap, which is descended from après.

==== Jèrriais ====
Formed exactly as in Rhenish German, Jèrriais constructs the continuous with verb êt' (be) + à (preposition) + infinitive. For example, j'têmes à mangi translates as we were eating.

=== German ===
There is no continuous aspect in standard German. The aspect can be expressed with gerade (just now, at the moment) as in er liest gerade meaning he is reading. Certain regional dialects, such as those of the Rhineland, the Ruhr Area, and Westphalia, form a continuous aspect using the verb sein (to be), the inflected preposition am or beim (at the or on the), and the neuter noun that is formed from an infinitive. This construction was likely borrowed from Low German or Dutch which use the exact construction to convey the same meaning. For example, ich bin am Lesen, ich bin beim Lesen (literally I am on/at the reading) means I am reading. Known as the rheinische Verlaufsform (roughly Rhenish progressive form), it has become increasingly common in the casual speech of many speakers around Germany through popular media and music, although it is still frowned upon in formal and literary contexts. In Southern Austro-Bavarian, the aspect can be expressed using tun (to do) as an auxiliary with the infinitive of the verb as in er tut lesen for he is reading (cf. English he does reading).

=== Hawaiian ===
In Hawaiian, the present tense progressive aspect form ke + verb + nei is very frequently used.

=== Hindi-Urdu ===
Hindi-Urdu (Hindustani) has distinct constructions to convey progressive and continuous actions. Progressive actions are marked through the progressive aspect participle rahā used along with the verb root, while the continuous action is conveyed through the perfective adjectival participle which is constructed by conjugating the verb into its perfective aspect participle and combining it with the perfective aspect participle of the verb honā (to be), which is huā.

| | Hindi | Urdu | Transliteration | Translation |
|---|---|---|---|---|
| 1a | बैठ रहा है | بیٹھ رہا ہے | baiṭh rahā hai | He is sitting. (nuanceː he is in the process of sitting) |
| 1b | बैठा हुआ है | بیٹھا ہوا ہے | baiṭhā huā hai | He is sitting. (nuanceː he is already sitting) |
| 2a | शर्ट पहन रही हूँ | شرط پھن رہی ہوں | śarṭ pêhên rahī hū̃ | I am wearing a shirt. (nuanceː I am in the process of wearing a shirt) |
| 2b | शर्ट पहनी हुई हूँ | شرط پہنی ہی ہوں | śarṭ pêhnī huī hū̃ | I am wearing a shirt. (nuanceː I am already wearing a shirt) |

=== Icelandic ===
Icelandic possesses a present continuous aspect much like that found in English. This feature is unique among the Scandinavian languages. It is formed with the copula vera (to be) + að (infinitive marker) + infinite verb. Its usage differs slightly from English, as it generally cannot be used in static contexts, for example standing or sitting, but rather to describe specific activities. The following examples illustrate this phenomenon.

Ég er að borða eplið.
I'm eating the apple.

In contrast with:

Ég stend á borðinu.
I'm standing on the table.

In the second example, the simple present tense is used as it describes a state, standing on the table. The construction *ég er að standa á borðinu is incorrect in Icelandic. In addition this method of constructing the continuous present there exists a second method akin to the one which exists in the other Scandinavian languages, where a present participle ending in -andi is used along with the copula vera. This is a way of using the present participle that is analysed as more adjectival or adverbial than verbal, as it cannot be used with transitive verbs. With certain verbs it also has a frequentative implication, as in the following example:

Ég er gangandi í skóla.
I walk to school (regularly).

Technically the use of the present participle is often not an example of continuous aspect in Icelandic.

=== Italian ===
Italian forms a progressive aspect in much the same way as in Spanish, using a conjugated form of the auxiliary verb stare ("to stay") followed by the gerund of the main verb. There are only two forms of gerunds, the choice depending upon the ending of the main verb in the infinitive: -ando for verbs whose infinitive ends in -are (parlare/parlando, mangiare/mangiando) or -endo if the infinitive ends in -ere or -ire (leggere/leggendo, dormire/dormendo). Thus 'I am speaking/reading/sleeping' is expressed Sto parlando/leggendo/dormendo.

==== Present tense ====
The present tense and the present progressive can have distinct meanings in Italian. Both can be used for present-time actions in progress: parlo con Mario and sto parlando con Mario can both mean 'I'm speaking with Mario (this moment, right now)', but only the bare present can be used to express ongoing state, as in parlo inglese 'I speak English', i.e. to convey the information 'I am able to speak English' (regardless of what I am doing at the time of speaking). Thus the present progressive clarifies immediacy: Sto uscendo 'I'm leaving (just now; on my way out)'.

The present progressive is formed by using the present tense of the verb stare + the gerund. As in English, the gerund conveys the main meaning of the utterance: sto pattinando (skating), I am skating. For the regular verbs, the gerund is formed from the infinitive of the verb by taking the stem and attaching the appropriate gerund suffix: -are verbs take -ando and the -ere and -ire verbs both take -endo. The table shows the conjugations of stare in the present tense with a gerund to exemplify the present progressive:

| person | avere | essere | parlare | credere | finire | dire | opporre |
|---|---|---|---|---|---|---|---|
| io | sto avendo | sto essendo | sto parlando | sto credendo | sto finendo | sto dicendo | sto opponendo |
| tu | stai avendo | stai essendo | stai parlando | stai credendo | stai finendo | stai dicendo | stai opponendo |
| egli/ella | sta avendo | sta essendo | sta parlando | sta credendo | sta finendo | sta dicendo | sta opponendo |
| noi | stiamo avendo | stiamo essendo | stiamo parlando | stiamo credendo | stiamo finendo | stiamo dicendo | stiamo opponendo |
| voi | state avendo | state essendo | state parlando | state credendo | state finendo | state dicendo | state opponendo |
| essi/esse | stanno avendo | stanno essendo | stanno parlando | stanno credendo | stanno finendo | stanno dicendo | stanno opponendo |

The present progressive tense has a very predictable conjugation pattern even for verbs that are typically irregular, such as essere ("to be") and avere ("to have"). For verbs with reduced infinitives, the gerund uses the same stem as the imperfect (which sometimes corresponds to the stem of the 1st person singular indicative present).

| infinitive | 1st sing. present | 1st sing. imperfect | gerund |
|---|---|---|---|
| dire | dico | dicevo | dicendo |
| bere | bevo | bevevo | bevendo |
| fare | faccio | facevo | facendo |
| porre | pongo | ponevo | ponendo |

==== Past tense ====
To form the past progressive, stare is conjugated in the imperfect and used with the gerund. For example, while sto andando means "I am going", stavo andando expresses I was going. In conventional Italian speaking, stavo andando and imperfect andavo are mostly interchangeable in the progressive meaning (stavo andando/andavo in ospedale... 'I was going [i.e. on my way] to the hospital...'), whereas past habitual "I used to go", "I went (often, repeatedly)" is expressible only with the imperfect andavo.

Conjugations of the Past Progressive:

| person | avere | essere | parlare | credere | finire | dire | opporre |
|---|---|---|---|---|---|---|---|
| io | stavo avendo | stavo essendo | stavo parlando | stavo credendo | stavo finendo | stavo dicendo | stavo opponendo |
| tu | stavi avendo | stavi essendo | stavi parlando | stavi credendo | stavi finendo | stavi dicendo | stavi opponendo |
| lui/lei | stava avendo | stava essendo | stava parlando | stava credendo | stava finendo | stava dicendo | stava opponendo |
| noi | stavamo avendo | stavamo essendo | stavamo parlando | stavamo credendo | stavamo finendo | stavamo dicendo | stavamo opponendo |
| voi | stavate avendo | stavate essendo | stavate parlando | stavate credendo | stavate finendo | stavate dicendo | stavate opponendo |
| loro | stavano avendo | stavano essendo | stavano parlando | stavano credendo | stavano finendo | stavano dicendo | stavano opponendo |

Like the present progressive, the Italian past progressive is extremely regular. Forms of stare are those common to -are verbs in the imperfect (stare/stavo, parlare/parlavo, etc.).

There is no readily available means in Italian for expressing the distinction between English "We were reading" and "We have been reading."

=== Japanese ===
Standard Japanese uses the same grammar form to form the progressive and the continuous aspect, specifically by using the -te iru form of a verb. Depending on the transitivity of the verb, they are interpreted as either progressive or continuous. For example:

Intransitive:

ペンが鞄に入っている。
Pen ga kaban ni haitte iru.
The pen is in the bag (continuous).

Transitive:

彼は晩ご飯を食べている。
Kare wa ban-gohan o tabeteiru.
He is eating dinner (progressive).

彼はペンを鞄に入れている。
Kare wa pen o kaban ni irete iru.
He is putting the pen in the bag (resultative). – this is usually understood to be resultative state as in "he keeps the pen in the bag" but can syntactically be interpreted as progressive, however this is highly strange and pragmatically incorrect.

Some dialects such as Chūgoku dialect and Shikoku dialect have different grammar forms for the progressive and the continuous aspect; the -yoru form for the progressive and the -toru form for the continuous. For example:

Continuous:

桜の花が散っとる。
Sakura no hana ga chittoru.
The cherry blossoms have fallen.

Progressive:

桜の花が散りよる。
Sakura no hana ga chiriyoru.
The cherry blossoms are falling.

=== Pantesco ===
In the Pantesco dialect of Sicilian, a progressive aspect can be formed by the use of clitics, which are formed from unstressed versions of the dialect's personal pronouns. This structure is unique among Romance languages.

| | | Subject Pronoun | Clitic | Verb | English Translation |
| sing. | 1st | jè(u) | jè | manciu | 'I am eating' |
| sing. | 2nd | tu | tu | manci | 'you are eating' |
| sing. | 3rd (masc) | iddhu | (i)ddhu | mancia | ‘he is eating’ |
| sing. | 3rd (fem) | iddha | (i)ddha | mancia | ‘she is eating’ |
| pl. | 1st | n(i)àtri | n(i)àtri | manciamu | ‘we are eating’ |
| pl. | 2nd | viàtri | viàtri | manciàti | ‘you are eating’ |
| pl. | 3rd | iddhi | (i)ddhi | màncianu | ‘they are eating’ |

=== Portuguese ===
In Portuguese the continuous aspect is marked by gerund, either by a proper -ndo ending (common in Brazil and Southern and insular Portugal) or a (to) and the infinitive (gerundive infinitive – the standard form in most of Portugal); for example to be doing would be either estar a fazer or, similar to other Romance languages, estar fazendo.

=== Quechua ===
Quechua uses a specific suffix: -chka or -ykaa; which is directly attached before the conjugation suffixes. Although the continuous aspect in Quechua is similar to that of English, it is more used than the simple tenses and is commonly translated into them (simple present and simple past), because of the idea that actions are not instantaneous, but they have a specific duration (mikuni [I eat] and mikuchkani [I am eating] are both correct, but it is preferred to use mikuchkani because we do not eat in a second).

=== Slavic languages ===
In Slavic languages, there is a clear distinction between perfective and imperfective grammatical aspects in the verb stem, with the latter emphasizing that the action is, was or will be in progress (habitual or otherwise). It was in relation to these languages that the modern concept of grammatical aspect in general originally developed. The majority of verbs in Slavic languages have at least one complementary verb for both aspects – e.g. Czech koupit (perfective; done on a single occasion) and kupovat (imperfective; done over a longer period of time) which translates as "to buy" and "be buying" respectively.

Perfective verbs are commonly formed from imperfective ones by the addition of a prefix; conversely the imperfective verb can be formed from the perfective one by modification of the stem or ending. Suppletion also plays a small role. Perfective verbs generally cannot be used with the meaning of a present tense – their present-tense forms in fact have future reference. An example of such a pair of verbs, from Polish, is given below:

- Infinitive (and dictionary form): pisać ("to write", imperfective); napisać ("to write", perfective)
- Simple present/future tense: pisze ("writes"); napisze ("will write", perfective)
- Compound future tense (imperfective only): będzie pisać ("will write, will be writing")
- Past tense: pisał ("was writing, used to write, wrote", imperfective); napisał ("wrote", perfective)

In at least the East and West Slavic languages, there is a three-way aspect differentiation for verbs of motion, with two forms of imperfective, determinate and indeterminate, and one form of perfective. The two forms of imperfective can be used in all three tenses (past, present, and future), but the perfective can only be used with past and future. The indeterminate imperfective expresses habitual aspect (or motion in no single direction), while the determinate imperfective expresses progressive aspect. The difference corresponds closely to that between English "I (regularly) go to school" and "I am going to school (now)". The three-way difference is given below for the Russian basic (unprefixed) verbs of motion. When prefixes are attached to Russian verbs of motion, they become more or less normal imperfective/perfective pairs, although the prefixes are generally attached to the indeterminate imperfective to form the prefixed imperfective and to the determinate imperfective to form the prefixed perfective. For example, prefix при- + indeterminate ходи́ть = приходи́ть; and prefix при- + determinate идти́ = прийти (to arrive (on foot)).

=== Spanish ===
In Spanish, the continuous is constructed much as in English, using a conjugated form of estar (to be) plus the gerundio (gerund/gerundive/adverbial participle) of the main verb; for example, estar haciendo means to be doing (haciendo being the gerundio of hacer, to do).

Like English, Spanish also has a few related constructions with similar structures and related meanings; for example, seguir haciendo means to keep doing (seguir being to continue).

Conjugations of the Present Progressive in Spanish:

| person | estar (to be) | hablar (to talk) | creer (to believe) | terminar (to finish) | decir (to say) | trabajar (to work) |
|---|---|---|---|---|---|---|
| yo | estoy | estoy hablando | estoy creyendo | estoy terminando | estoy diciendo | estoy trabajando |
| tú | estás | estás hablando | estás creyendo | estás terminando | estás diciendo | estás trabajando |
| usted | está | está hablando | está creyendo | está terminando | está diciendo | está trabajando |
| él/ella | está | está hablando | está creyendo | está terminando | está diciendo | está trabajando |
| nosotros | estamos | estamos hablando | estamos creyendo | estamos terminando | estamos diciendo | estamos trabajando |
| ustedes | están | están hablando | están creyendo | están terminando | están diciendo | están trabajando |
| ellos | están | están hablando | están creyendo | están terminando | están diciendo | están trabajando |

=== Swedish ===
Swedish has several ways of constructing continuous aspect.

- The first is using the form hålla på att + infinitive ("hold on" meaning "in the process of"). For instance jag håller på att skriva ett brev ("I'm writing a letter").
- Some verbs are always or default continuous, for instance verbs indicating motion, location or position, such as gå "walk", ligga "lie", sitta "sit" and stå "stay". This means their present tense forms are their continuous forms: Han ligger i min säng ("he lies in my bed") means "he is lying in my bed", and hon sitter i köket "she sits in the kitchen" means "she is sitting in the kitchen". Note this means Swedish often has two different forms to simple verbs when they make sense both continuous and non-continuous – English has only one such fully functional pair remaining, and it happens to share this one with Swedish att lägga (sig) ("to lay") and "att ligga" (to lie) – "Lay down so you can lie down" = "Lägg dig ner så du kan ligga ner".
- Using these default continuous verbs together with a non-default continuous verb makes both continuous. This is a form also used in other Germanic languages such as Norwegian, Danish and Dutch. For instance: Han ligger och läser, han står och läser, han sitter och läser and han går och läser, all mean "he is reading (while lying/standing/sitting/going)". Also note that these may be in the past tense: Han låg och läste, han stod och läste, han satt och läste and han gick och läste, all mean "he was reading (while lying/standing/sitting/going)".

== See also ==
- Frequentative
- Grammatical aspect
- Imperfective aspect
- Grammar of the Breton language
