= Pantesco dialect =

Sicilian dialect spoken in Pantelleria

Pantesco
- pantiscu / (rare) pantizzariscu
- Pronunciation: [panˈtɪskʊ] [pantɪɖːʐaˈɾɪskʊ]
- Native to: Italy
- Region: Pantelleria
- Ethnicity: Sicilians (Panteschi)
- Language family: Indo-European: Italic; Latino-Faliscan; Latin; Romance; Italo-Western; Italo-Dalmatian; Italo-Romance; Extreme Southern Italian; Sicilian; Pantesco

Language codes
- ISO 639-3: –
- Glottolog: pant1252

Pantesco (Sicilian: pantiscu, pronounced [panˈtɪskʊ] or less commonly pantizzariscu, pronounced [pantɪɖːʐaˈɾɪskʊ]) is the Sicilian dialect of the island of Pantelleria, between Sicily and Tunisia. It is notable among Romance varieties for an unusually high degree of influence from Arabic, originating in an Arabic dialect similar to Maltese, which was spoken on the island until around the 19th century and is substratal to Pantesco.

Many Arabic loanwords are found in Pantesco, for example hurrìhi ("nettle") and kardèna ("tick"). These terms frequently refer to a rural lifestyle, have negative connotations or are even limited to use with reference to animals, reflecting the low prestige of the extinct Arabic dialect. In such loans, the glottal fricative /h/ (unusual for a Romance dialect) is preserved as a reflex of Arabic laryngeals /h/, /x/, /ħ/ and sometimes even /q/.

In addition to lexical and phonological influence, the grammar of Pantesco shows Arabic influence in its formation of the periphrastic future and the pluperfect. Pantesco uses unstressed subject pronoun clitics to form a continuous aspect, which is unique among Romance languages. The dialect has undergone a process of Sicilianisation, by which it has lost most of its Arabic vocabulary, and is currently undergoing a language shift to Italian. A dictionary of Pantesco was published by Giovanni Tropea in 1988.

== History ==
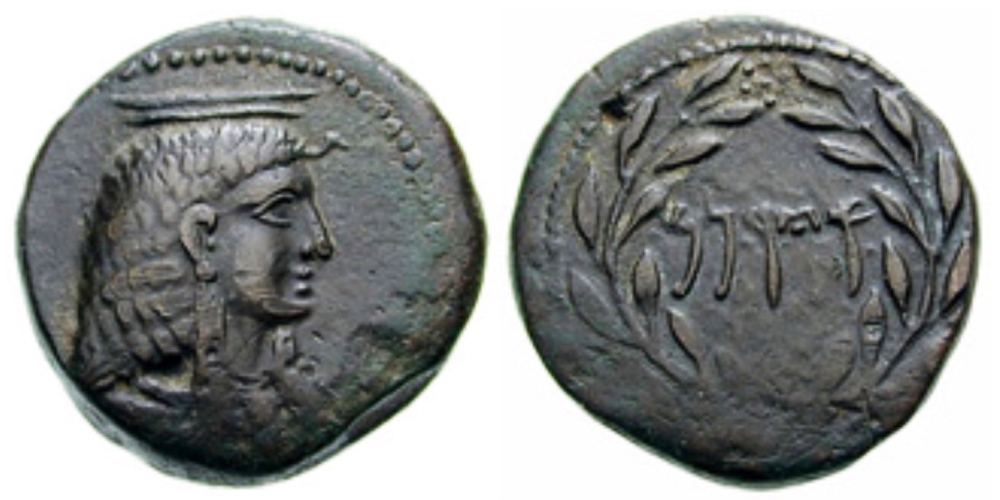
Bronze coin found on Pantelleria showing a portrait of Isis with Punic inscription.

Pantelleria was occupied from the Neolithic period, and in classical times Punic, Greek and Latin were spoken on the island. However, no trace of a substrate originating in these languages is detectable in Pantesco, as it appears that the island was forcibly depopulated, through massacre or deportation, when it was conquered by the Aghlabids in 840.

=== The Arabic dialect of Pantelleria ===
Pantellerian Arabic
- Arabic Dialect of Pantelleria
- Ethnicity: Pantellerians
- Extinct: Late 18th century
- Language family: Afro-Asiatic: Semitic; West Semitic; Central Semitic; Arabic; Maghrebi; Pre-Hilalian; Sicilian Arabic (Likely); Pantellerian Arabic
- Early form: Sicilian Arabic
- Writing system: Unwritten

Language codes
- ISO 639-3: –

It is likely that Pantelleria was uninhabited for a period of time before being resettled by Arab Muslims at some point prior to 1127. It is not known whether the settlers initially spoke a variety of Sicilian or Maghrebi Arabic, as no written record of the dialect exists and the process of resettlement of the island was not documented.

Following the Norman conquest of Pantelleria in 1127, the island's Muslim Arab population came under the control of the Kingdom of Sicily. This placed them under the government of a Christian bureaucracy, which used both Arabic and Greek as languages of administration, although this was changed to Latin around the turn of the 13th century. The Christianisation and Latinisation of the population on the island was initially much slower than on Malta, with the Islamic faith definitely surviving until the 15th century. Likewise, the rural areas of Pantelleria remained entirely Arabic-speaking throughout the medieval period. However, the port and castle were colonised by merchants and officials from Sicily, who were later joined by others from Genoa and Catalonia. The castle was therefore Christian and increasingly Romance in its language, which, due to rough terrain, did not spread to the isolated settlements of the rural population.

During the 16th century, Pantelleria was prey to attacks not only by Barbary corsairs, who treated it the same as any other Christian territory, but also Christian pirates, for whom the inhabitants' Arabic speech rendered them legitimate targets. In 1599, the island was visited by the bishop of Mazara, who found that young people still wore Moorish clothing and spoke Arabic. He ordered that these customs should cease, and that the population should adopt Sicilian customs. The rural areas of the island were still Arabophone in 1670, when a visiting French captain was forced to use a Maltese interpreter to converse with the population because "the language of Malta is the same as that of Pantelleria".

=== The shift to Sicilian ===
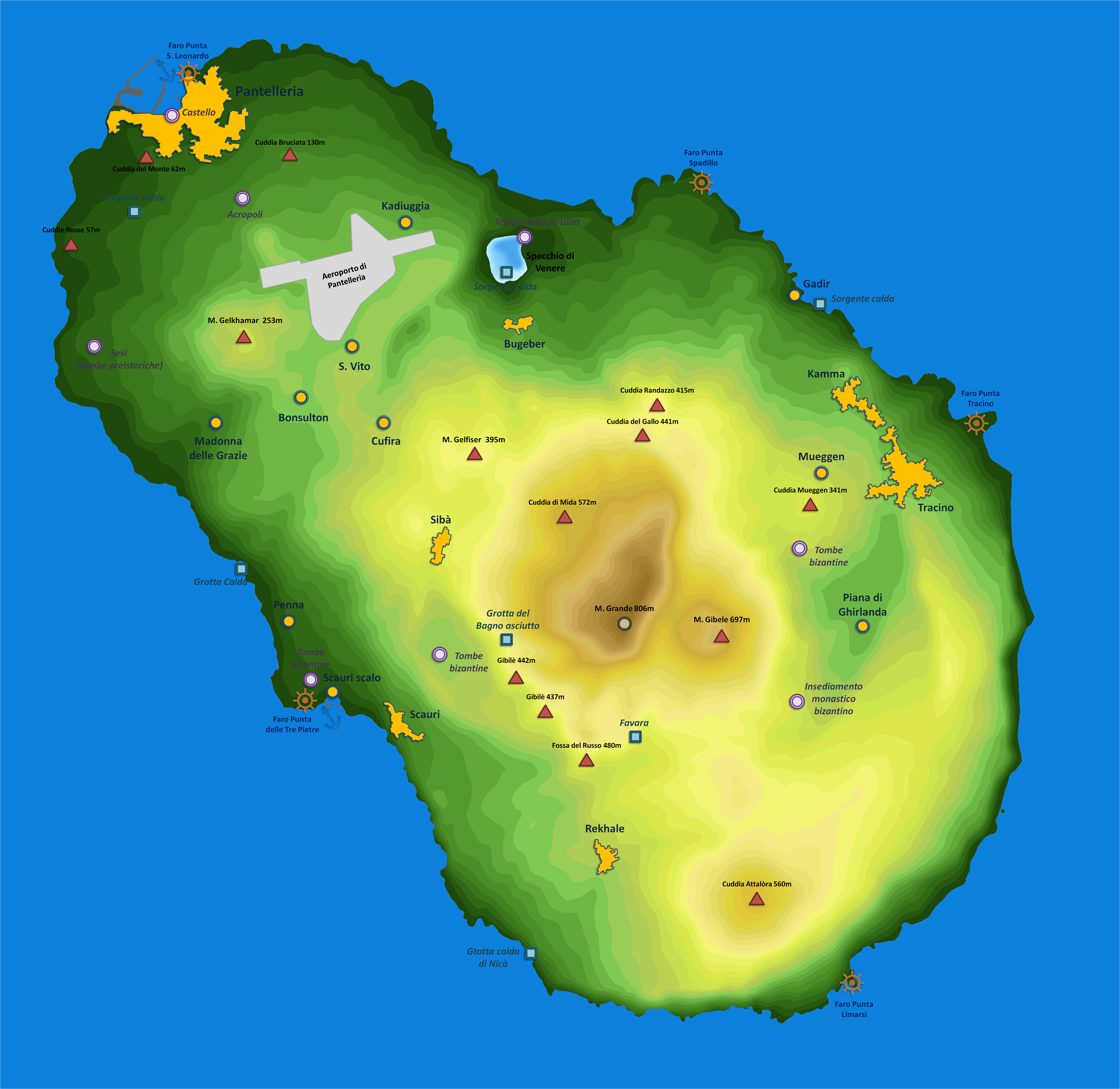
Map of Pantelleria, U Paìsi , the port in the north of the island, was the first part of Pantelleria to adopt Sicilian. Arabic remained in use in the mountainous interior much longer.

Pantesco is descended from the Sicilian dialects of Trapani, the nearest point on the Sicilian mainland. The process by which the Arab population adopted Sicilian is not well-documented, but Maltese linguist Joseph Brincat states that the conversion of the island to Christianity and the emigration of mudéjars who refused to convert, alongside pirate raids, were contributing factors. It is also possible that official linguistic policy favoured the abandonment of Arabic language features in the 19th and 20th century.

French historian Henri Bresc describes a process of Latinisation of the population, by which speakers of different Romance varieties from Spain and Italy congregated on the island, producing a new oral culture which absorbed vocabulary and habits from the Arabic population into the new Pantesco reality. On the other hand, Brincat views the process of language shift as a gradual incorporation of Trapanese Sicilian words into the island's Arabic speech, until it was more Sicilian than Arabic. This would, in his view, explain the fact that the Arabic vocabulary is limited to "the elementary activities of daily life", particularly farming.

Although monolingual speakers are documented at the end of the 17th century, no later direct evidence of Arabic on the island exists. Brincat suggests that the population switched to Sicilian during the 19th century. Despite the disappearance of Arabic, its influence on Pantesco was significant, leaving effects on its vocabulary, grammar and phonology, which made it the most Arabised of all the Romance languages.

=== Modern period ===
Pantesco in the 20th century underwent a process of de-Arabisation, becoming gradually more similar to mainland Sicilian dialects. Several factors contributed to this. The construction of roads on the island reduced the isolation of the rural areas and brought conservative countryside speakers into contact with the more Sicilianised dialect of the port. In addition, prior to the Second World War, a prison colony existed on Pantelleria, and Italian military personnel were stationed there. These outsiders were agents of Italianisation on the island.

A record of the pre-war dialect exists in a 1937 dissertation by Maria Valenza, the first study conducted on the language of the island. By the 1950s, the Sicilianisation of Pantesco was extensive, with much Arabic vocabulary already lost. In 1964-1967, Anna Rosa D'Ancona carried out fieldwork on the island, which would be used as the source material Giovanni Tropea's 1988 Lessico del dialetto di Pantelleria, the main source for study of the dialect.

A process of further Italianisation began in the late 20th century, with younger inhabitants of Pantelleria abandoning their mother tongue in favour of regional Italian. Speakers on the island around the turn of the century associated Italian with progress and economic advancement, and Pantesco with a backwards rural lifestyle. Brincat writes that, as of 2011, no literature had been published in Pantesco, reflecting the low status of the language.

== Literature ==
Although little has been published in Pantesco, the dialect has a tradition of poetry. The local Italian-language press occasionally publish poems in Pantesco, as well as collections of sayings with translations and explanations.

In 2018, a collection of poetry in Pantesco, Eco di suoni panteschi, was published in Brescia by Beatrice Cornado, a daughter of emigrants from the island. The poet Lillo di Bonsulton, who died in 2022, published many poems in the local newspapers, and was well-known on the island. In memory of Bonsulton, the local council of Pantelleria inaugurated the annual Premio Lillo di Bonsulton, a poetry prize with categories for poetry written in Italian and Pantesco.

== Phonology ==
=== Vowels ===
==== Stressed vowels ====
Pantesco has five stressed vowels, which are the same as those in other dialects of Sicilian.

Stressed vowels in Pantesco
	Front	Central	Back
Close	ɪ		ʊ
Close-mid			
Open-mid	ɛ		ɔ
Open		a	

In addition to this, [o] exists as a possible allophone of /ɔ/ in stressed syllables, and the close-mid [e] can replace /ɛ/.

Allophones of stressed vowels in Pantesco
Spelling	Pronunciation	Allophone	English
bbònu	/b:ɔnʊ/	[b:onʊ]	'good'
tèmpu	/tɛmpʊ/	[tempʊ]	'time'

=== Unstressed vowels ===
In unstressed syllables, three vowels are possible in Pantesco: /ɪ/, /a/ and /ʊ/. Allophones of two of these exist; /ɪ/ can be pronounced as [e] while /ʊ/ can become [o].

Allophones of unstressed vowels in Pantesco
Spelling	Pronunciation	Allophone	English
bbònu	/b:ɔnʊ/	[b:ɔno]	'good'
picciuttèddhi	/pɪtʃʊt:ɛɖːʐɪ/	[pɪtʃʊt:ɛɖːʐe]	'boys'

=== Consonants ===
Consonant phonemes (according to Idone, 2018)
		Bilabial	Labio- dental	Alveolar	Post- alveolar	Retroflex	Palatal	Velar	Glottal
Nasal		m	[ɱ]	n			ɲ	[ŋ]	
Plosive	voiceless	p		t		ʈ	c	k	
Plosive	voiced	b		d		ɖ	ɟ	ɡ	
Affricate	voiceless			ts	tʃ				
Affricate	voiced			[dz]	dʒ				
Fricative	voiceless		f	s	ʃ	ʂ	ç		[h]
Fricative	voiced		v	[z]				[ɣ]	
Approximant				l			j	w	
Trill				r		ɽ			

The phoneme /h/ is unusual in Romance languages. In Pantesco it is used exclusively in words borrowed from the Arabic dialect formerly spoken on the island, replacing the Arabic phonemes /h/, /χ/, /ħ/ and /q/. Writing in 2011, Joseph Brincat states that /h/ is a rural pronunciation which has now been replaced by /c/, a feature previously characteristic of the dialect of the town of Pantelleria (u paìsi "the village" in Pantesco). Alice Idone still included it as a feature of rural speech in 2017.

== Grammar ==
=== Similarities to Sicilian and Maltese ===
The grammar of Pantesco is generally similar to that of other varieties of Sicilian, however, it has several features which are more similar to Maltese, an Arabic-derived Semitic language. Pantesco forms the pluperfect using the verb "to be" which is a close parallel of the form used in Maltese. Another grammatical similarity to Maltese is the use of the preterite (known as the "remote past" in Italian) to indicate an event which is certain to occur in the near future. Pantesco also forms a periphrastic future by conjugating both the auxiliary verb and the main verb, as in Maltese.

Pantesco differs from both Sicilian and Maltese in its use of clitics to form a progressive aspect, which is unique among Romance languages.

=== Articles ===
Pantesco articles vary according to number, gender and definiteness.

The definite article in Sicilian parallels that of other South Italian varieties, in that it only differentiates between masculine and feminine nouns in the singular. The definite article for singular masculine nouns is u whereas singular female nouns take a. Both feminine and masculine nouns use the plural definite article i.

The definite article in Pantesco with initial consonant
	Singular	Plural
Masculine	U santu "The [male] saint"	I santi "The [male, female or mixed gender] saints"
Feminine	A santa "The [female] saint"	I santi "The [male, female or mixed gender] saints"

When the noun begins with a vowel, the definite article is l' for all genders and numbers.

The indefinite article in Pantesco is usually used only in the singular:

The indefinite article in Pantesco
	Singular
Masculine	un
Feminine	una

The only situation in which the indefinite article is used with plural nouns is when the adjective àutri is followed by a number and a plural noun.

n'àutri and plural nouns
n'àutri cincu cristiani."Five more people"
'n'	àutri	cincu	cristiani
INDEF	other. PL	five	people(M). PL

=== Adjectives ===
In Pantesco, the majority of adjectives accord with the gender of the noun in the singular, but not in the plural.

Class 1 adjectives in Pantesco: amàru ("bitter")
	Singular	Plural
Masculine	-u amàru	-i amàri
Feminine	-a amàra	-i amàri

Another class of adjectives is invariable according to number and gender.

Class 2 adjectives in Pantesco: ssadì ("rancid")
	Singular Plural
Masculine; Feminine	ssadì

=== Nouns ===
There are five classes of nouns in Pantesco, which display two genders (masculine and feminine) and two numbers (singular and plural).

Inflectional endings in Pantesco nouns
Infection class	Inflectional marking (SG/PL)		
1	-u / -i	picciòttu / picciòtti	"boy / boys"
2	-a / -i	casa / casi	"house / houses"
3	-i / -i	ciùri / ciùri	"flower / flowers"
4	-u / -a	vrazzu / vrazza	"arm / arms"
5	-u / -u	manu / manu	"hand / hands"

=== Pronouns ===
Pantesco personal pronouns exist in strong (stressed) and clitic forms. Loporcaro gives the following schema:

		Strong		Clitic		
		Subject	Object	Direct Object	Indirect Object	Reflexive
sg.	1st	ˈje	ˈmɪːa	mɪ		
sg.	2nd	ˈtʊ	ˈtɪːa	tɪ		
sg.	3rd (masc)	ˈɪɖːʐʊ		(l)ʊ	(t)ʃɪ	sɪ
sg.	3rd (fem)	ˈɪɖːʐa		(l)a	(t)ʃɪ	sɪ
pl.	1st	ˈn(j)aːʈʂɪ		nɪ/mɪ		
pl.	2nd	ˈv(j)aːʈʂɪ		vɪ		
pl.	3rd	ˈɪɖːʐɪ		(l)ɪ	(t)ʃɪ	sɪ

==== Possessives ====
Possessives only agree with the noun's gender and number in the first and second person plural.

Possessive pronouns
		Singular		Plural	
		Masculine	Feminine	Masculine	Feminine
sg.	1st	me			
sg.	2nd	to			
sg.	3rd	so			
pl.	1st	nòstru	nòstra	nòstri	
pl.	2nd	vòstru	vòstra	vòstri	
pl.	3rd	so			

Determiners can generally be used with possessive pronouns in Pantesco, except when referring to a close family member, where the definite article is never used.

==== Demonstratives ====
Pantesco demonstrative pronouns and adjectives have two grades of proximity, proximal (e.g. chistu, "this") and distal (e.g. chiddhu, "that").

Proximal demonstratives in Pantesco (this/these)
	Singular	Plural
Masculine	(chi)stu	chi(sti)
Feminine	(chi)sta	chi(sti)

Distal demonstratives in Pantesco (that/those)
	Singular	Plural
Masculine	(chi)ddhu	chi(ddhi)
Feminine	(chi)ddha	chi(ddhi)

These are frequently shortened when used as adjectives, but never when used as a demonstrative pronouns.

Demonstrative adjectives (reducible)
Chista/Sta picciotta è bbeddha. "This girl is beautiful"
Chista/Sta	picciotta	è	bbeddha
DEM.PROX.F.SG	girl (F).SG	be PRS.3SG	beautiful.F.SG

Demonstrative pronouns (not reducible)
È Maria chista. "This is Maria"
è	Maria	chista
be PRS.3SG	Maria	DEM.PROX.F.SG

=== Adverbs ===
Adverbs of manner are identical in form to their corresponding adjectives, for example bbonu means both "good" and "well". Where the verb is intransitive, the adverb usually agrees with the subject, but where it is transitive, the adverb agrees with the object.

=== Verbs ===
As with other Romance languages, verbs have basal infinitive forms which are then inflected for tense and signal agreement by number and person. As in other South Italian languages, the present subjunctive is absent in Pantesco. The present perfect tense is almost completely absent, with Brincat stating it is only used to describe frequently repeated actions which have the potential to reoccur in future. In common with most south Italian varieties, no future tense exists in Pantesco, with the future instead being constructed by employing modal phrases (periphrastic future). Pantesco uses an unusual form of the Pluperfect, using the verb to be, which is calqued from the Arabic dialect formerly spoken on the island. It is also unique among Sicilian dialects for using a clitic pronoun to form the progressive aspect.

==== Conjugation of simple tenses ====
Illustration of Pantesco simple tenses using the verb ˈfaːrɪ ("to do")
Tense	Example	English equivalent
Indicative Mood
Present	fazzu ˈ[fatːsʊ]	I do
Imperfect	facia [fa'ʃiːa]	I used to do I was doing
Preterite	fici ˈ[fiːʃɪ]	I did / I have done
Subjunctive mood
Imperfect	facissi [faˈʃisːɪ]	(If ) I did...
Imperative mood
Present	fa! [fa]	(you) do!

The following examples display the indicative mood of the two main conjugations of regular verbs in Pantesco, the first conjugation is illustrated by cantari [kanˈtaːrɪ] ("to sing") and the example of the second conjugation is bbattiri [ˈbːatːɪrɪ] ("to beat"). The infinitive of first conjugation verbs ends in -ari, that of second conjugation verbs in -iri.

The two Pantesco conjugations in the indicative mood
	Present		Preterite		Imperfect	
	1st Conj.	2nd Conj.	1st Conj.	2nd Conj.	1st Conj.	2nd Conj.
jè	cantu [ˈkantʊ]	bbattu [ˈbːatːʊ]	cantavi [kan'tai] or [kan'tavi]	bbatti [bːa'tːi(e)], [bːa'tːe]	cantava [kanˈtaːva]	bbattia [bːaˈtːiːa]
tu	canti [ˈkantɪ]	bbatti [ˈbːatːɪ]	cantasti [kanˈtastɪ]	bbattisti [bːaˈtːistɪ]	cantivi [kanˈtaːvɪ]	bbatie [bːaˈtːiːe]
iddhu, iddha	canta [ˈkanta]	bbatti [ˈbːatːɪ]	cantau [kanˈtau̯]	bbattiu [bːaˈtːiːʊ]	cantava [kanˈtaːva]	bbattia [bːaˈtːiːa]
n(i)àtri	cantammu [kan'tamːʊ]	bbatemu [bːa'tːɛːmʊ]	cantammu [kan'tamːʊ]	bbatimmu [bːaˈtːimːʊ]	cantammu [kan'tamːʊ]	bbatimmu [bːaˈtːimːʊ]
viàtri	cantati [kanˈtaːtɪ]	bbattiti [bːaˈtːiːtɪ]	cantàstivu [kan'tastɪvʊ]	bbattistivu [bːaˈtːistɪvʊ]	cantavu [kanˈtavːʊ]	bbattivvu [bːa'tːivːʊ]
iddhi	cantinu [ˈkantɪnʊ]	bbattinu [ˈbːatːɪnʊ]	cantaru [kanˈtaːrʊ]	bbatteru [bːaˈtːeːrʊ]	cantannu [kan'tanːʊ]	bbattinnu bːaˈtːinːʊ

A subclass of the first conjugation exists for verbs which end in -iari (e.g. taliari [taliˈaːrɪ], "to look"; vuciari [vuʃɪˈaːrɪ], "to cry out"). These verbs place the stress on the second syllable in all persons and numbers of the present indicative, and may geminate the /n/ in the third person plural of the present.

A further subclass of the second conjugation exists for some verbs which originate in the second and fourth Latin conjugations, where the second syllable of the infinitive is stressed; for example finiri ([fiˈniːri]), "to finish". In the present tense, the second syllable of these verbs is also stressed in all persons and /ʃ/ is added to the second syllable in the first and second person singular and the third person singular and plural.(1SG fiˈniʃːʊ, 2SG fiˈniʃːɪ, 3SG fiˈniʃːɪ, 1PL fiˈnɛːmʊ, 2PL fiˈniːtɪ, 3PL fiˈniʃːɪnʊ).

A large number of more frequently used verbs are irregular. The verbs generally follow the pattern of endings above, with variations to the stem, however, some verbs are more radically irregular. A full discussion of these verbs can be found in Giovanni Tropea's 1988 dictionary and a summary in a 2018 paper by Loporcaro, Kägi and Gardani.

Common irregular verbs in Pantesco
Verb	Translation	Verb	Translation
aviri esiri dari sapiri vuliri	to have to be to give to know to want	diri fari jiri veniri dormiri	to say to do to go to come to sleep

==== The pluperfect ====
The pluperfect for all persons and numbers is formed with the 3rd person singular imperfect of the verb "to be" and the inflected perfective. This structure is unique among Romance languages, and differs from other Sicilian dialects, which use the imperfect of the verb "to have" and the past participle. However, it has a parallel in Maltese, which suggests the structure originates in the Arabic dialect spoken on the island prior to the population's adoption of Sicilian.

The first three persons of the pluperfect in Sicilian, Pantesco and Maltese
Sicilian		Pantesco		Maltese	
Auxiliary Verb	Main Verb	Auxiliary Verb	Main Verb	Auxiliary Verb	Main Verb
àva have.IMPF.1SG	scrivutu write.PTP.M.SG	era be.IMPF.3SG	scrissi write.PRF.1SG	kont be.PFV.1SG	ktibt write.PFV.1SG
àutu have.IMPF.2SG	scrivutu write.PTP.M.SG	era be.IMPF.3SG	scrivìsti write.PRF.2SG	kont be.PFV.2SG	ktibt write.PFV.2SG
àva have.IMPF.3SG	scrivutu write.PTP.M.SG	era be.IMPF.3SG	scrissi write.PRF.3SG	kien be.PFV.3SG.M	kíteb write.PFV.3SG.M
àva have.IMPF.3SG	scrivutu write.PTP.M.SG	era be.IMPF.3SG	scrissi write.PRF.3SG	kienet be.PFV.3SG.F	kítbet write.PFV.3SG.F

==== Progressive clitics ====
As well as using a gerund and the verb to be to form a progressive aspect, as in Italian and Spanish, Pantesco uses clitics based on personal pronouns. The clitics are near identical to Pantesco subject pronouns, except in that they are unstressed and initial i can be dropped.

		Subject Pronoun	Clitic	Verb	English Translation
sing.	1st	jè(u)	jè	manciu	'I am eating'
sing.	2nd	tu	tu	manci	'you are eating'
sing.	3rd (masc)	iddhu	(i)ddhu	mancia	'he is eating'
sing.	3rd (fem)	iddha	(i)ddha	mancia	'she is eating'
pl.	1st	n(i)àtri	n(i)àtri	manciamu	'we are eating'
pl.	2nd	viàtri	viàtri	manciàti	'you are eating'
pl.	3rd	iddhi	(i)ddhi	màncianu	'they are eating'

In the variety of Pantesco spoken in the main town of Pantelleria, these clitics cannot be used in negative sentences. However, in the surrounding villages negation is allowed. Therefore, the following phrase would be grammatical for rural speakers, but not for those in the town: Viàtri un viàtri travagghjati ("You are not working").

==== Periphrastic future ====
Unlike in Italian, but in common with many South Italian dialects, Pantesco has no synthetic construction of the future tense. Instead it forms its future tense by inflecting ˈjiːrɪ ("to go") before the verb. Mainland Sicilian has a similar structure using the verb to go, but rather than using the infinitive, in Pantesco the following verb is conjugated to the present indicative. This structure is very similar to the periphrastic future in Maltese.

Mainland Sicilian			Pantesco		Maltese	
vaiu a vidiri "I'm going to see"			vaiu vídu "I'm going to see"		sejjer nara "I'm going to see"	
vaiu	a	vidiri	vaiu	vídu	sejjer	nara
"I go"	"to"	"see"	"I go"	"I see"	"I am going"	"I see"

== Vocabulary ==
=== Arabic loanwords ===
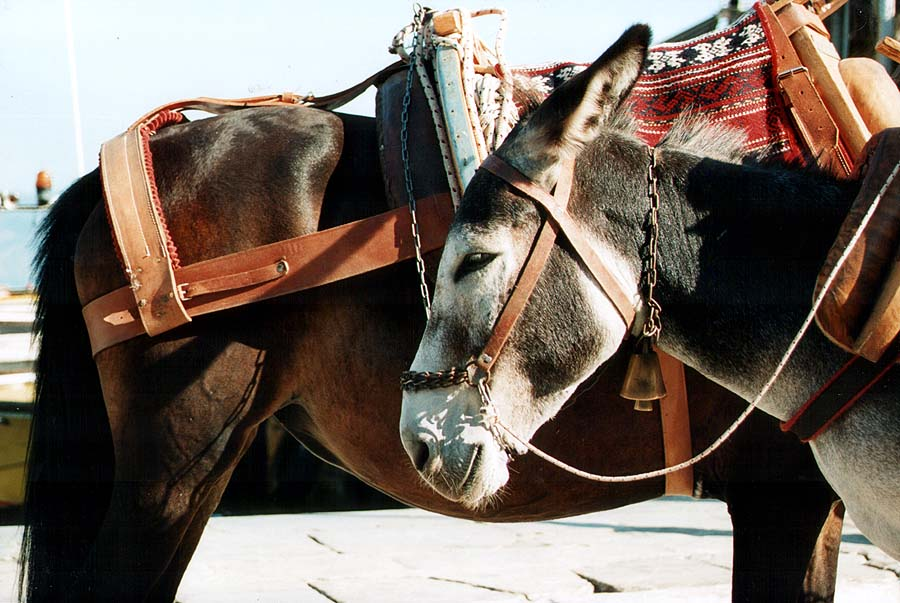
Several Arabic loanwords were used only as commands for, or in reference to, donkeys. These include árfa, bbarrà, harráçi and ššèkku.

As a Sicilian dialect, the larger part of the vocabulary of Pantesco is found in the dialects of mainland Sicily. However, in addition to the Siculo-Arabic substrata found in the mainland dialects, a considerable number of Arabic borrowings derived from the more recently extinct dialect spoken on the island are identifiable.

The borrowings are particularly concentrated in terminology related to rural and traditional life on the island. Staccioli gives over a hundred examples of these loanwords. Brincat points out that a large number of these words also exist in Maltese, with the same or related meanings.

Some Arabic loanwords in Pantesco
Landscape features
Pantesco	English	Arabic etymology
hàma	"mud"	ḥamā: "mud"
sammè / sammèmi	Adjective describing a particularly hard rock	ṣammā: "a massive hard rock"
turbè	"soft ground"	turbah: "ground, dust"
tabbiàtu	Adjective describing cultivated ground disturbed by footprint of a human or animal	ṭabʽah: "footprint"
Flora
Pantesco	English	Arabic etymology
ballùta	"oak"	ballūṭah: "acorn"
hafìru	"Avena barbata"	ḥufour: "Avena barbata"
hurrìhi	"nettle"	hurrāq: "nettle"
lillùća	"common marigold"	lelloucha: "common marigold" (Maghrebi Arabic)
Fauna
Pantesco	English	Arabic etymology
kardèna	"tick"	qurd, qurād: "tick"
ššèkku	"donkey"	šayḫ: "old man", "head of community"; probably ironic
sikàru	"vulture"	ṣaqr: "hawk, falcon"
vartàsa	"hornless goat"	farṭās: "mangy, scabby, bald"
Agricultural production
Pantesco	English	Arabic etymology
fàri hodà	"to mix yeast into flour"	ḥāda: "to mix"
kabùra/kavùra,	"whole dried fig"	kubār: "very big"
sifé	"wheat or barley chaff"	sāfiyā: "powder"
ššaràbba	"good wine"	šarāb: "a drink"
Terms related to social life
Pantesco	English	Arabic etymology
haràra	"a draught of warm air"	ḥarāra: "heat"
hazzèsa	"impetigo"	ḥazzāz: "skin eruption"
rahanì	"stale smell of a closed room"	rāḥa: "to stink"
sabbèlla	"a tap"	sabīl : "tap, public fountain"
Nautical terms
Pantesco	English	Arabic etymology
hèddi	"a calming of the wind"	hādi: "calm"
sòrra	"the belly of a fish"	surra : "the belly of a fish"
Money
Pantesco	English	Arabic etymology
arèmi, settarèmi	the coins suit in traditional Italian playing cards	dirham: the name of a type of coin used historically
filùsi	"money"	fulūs: "money"
handùsi	a type of coin frequently dug up on the island	indulsi: an Andalusian coin.
Interjections
Pantesco	English	Arabic etymology
àrfa	"raise", command given only to a donkey	rafaʽa: "raise"
àrà	exclamation of wonder or disappointment	ra'ā: "to see"
bbarrà	"stay away from the walls", command given only to a donkey	barr: "open country"
ćàlla	expression used for wishing luck	in šāʾ Allāh: "god willing"
nzamaddìu	An imprecation asking God to allow something to occur.	zaʽma: "permit, allow" + ddìu (Sicilian: "God"

==== Negative connotations of Arabic vocabulary ====
Brincat notes that many of the words originating in Arabic are not merely related to a primitive rural lifestyle, but have clearly negative connotations.

Arabic loanwords with negative connotations
Loanword	Translation	Loanword	Translation
hazzèsa súsa zzíbbula girbéçí hàma tába	ringworm woodworm rubbish pigsty mud stain	kardèna harbé mahótu midarrássu ggiméni vàkiçu	tick ruin snot teeth on edge uncultivated land horror

He also notes that words which in Maltese cover wide semantic fields and can be used to refer humans are given more specific negative meanings, or are used exclusively to refer to animals.

Negative semantic narrowing in Maltese/Pantesco cognates
Maltese	Meaning	Pantesco	Meaning
erfa'	imperative of the verb "to raise"	árfa	command for a donkey or horse to raise its hoof
ħanek	gums	hanéhi	gingivitis in horses
aħrax	hard, rough, harsh, cruel	harráçi	bad-tempered (used only to describe donkeys)
qallut	human or animal excrement	kallútu	dropping produced by horse, mule, donkey, cat, dog
qallut	human or animal excrement	kallùta	dry beady dropping produced by goats, sheep, rabbits
żarbun	shoe	zzarbúnni	wornout shapeless old shoe

=== Calques from Arabic ===
Various calques from Arabic are also present in Pantesco. The Sicilian term tinnùsu ("mangy")is used to mean "bald" on the island, this calques the Arabic word farṭās, which means "mangy", but which also has the meaning "bald" in Maltese. The word farṭās came to refer to hornless goats, so a new word was needed to cover the meaning of "mangy", this was obtained by using inkamulùto, from Arabic kamula, "woodworm". Another example is the word ṣṭṛàniu ("outsider") which would normally mean "strange" in Sicilian, but which on Pantelleria has taken on the secondary meaning of Arabic ġarīb ("strange, curious, foreign"). It is also possible that òčču d'àkua (lit. "eye of water") meaning "spring" is a calque from 'ayn ("eye") as this word is found in the names of many springs in Sicily.

=== Other Arabic influences on vocabulary ===
The influence of Arabic on Pantesco is also notable in terms of epenthesis, the insertion of a vowel, and metathesis, the swapping of a vowel and a consonant. These occur in Pantesco to avoid initial consonant clusters, which are found in Sicilian but would have been difficult to pronounce for Arabic speakers. For example, the Sicilian blusa ("blouse") became Pantesco bilùsa, frenu ("brake") > firènu, creta ("chalk/clay") > kirìta, cravatta ("tie") > kurvàta, precìso ("precise, exactly") > pirčìsu, trottola ("spinning top") > tòrtula.

Another effect, which is also found in Sicilian loans to Maltese, was the deletion of unstressed vowels. This phenomenon is very common in Maghrebi Arabic, and can be found in Pantesco words like mirtàre ("to deserve"; Italian meritare), mantrìnu ("mandarine orange"; Italian mandarìno), viṭṛinàriu ("veterinary surgeon"; Italian veterinàrio).

Staccioli notes that Pantesco uses repetition of words to form new but related words, and argues that this process has its origin in Arabic. Examples include guardegguàrda, from duplication of the imperative of the verb to look, which means "with great care"; and fàvi fàvi, from fàvi ("beans"), which is a dermatological reaction to contact with uncooked beans. He also gives the example of this doubling in an Arabic borrowing, kìffikìffi, an adjective meaning "of the same character". This originates in Arabic kifā meaning "the same" or "equivalent".
