= Siculo-Arabic =

Arabic dialect spoken in medieval Sicily

- Sicilian Arabic
- العربية الصقلية
- Native to: Emirate of Sicily
- Era: 9th–13th centuries developed into Old Maltese
- Language family: Afro-Asiatic: Semitic; West Semitic; Central Semitic; Arabic; Maghrebi; Pre-Hilalian; Pre-Hilalian Tunisian Arabic; Siculo-Arabic
- Dialects: Maltese; Cossurese †
- Writing system: Arabic alphabet

Language codes
- ISO 639-3: sqr
- Glottolog: sicu1235

Siculo-Arabic or Sicilian Arabic (Note: Arabic: اللَّهْجَة الْعَرَبِيَّة الصِّقِلِّيَّة, romanized: al-lahja l-ʿarabiyya ṣ-ṣiqilliyya) is a group of Arabic language varieties that were spoken in the Emirate of Sicily from the 9th century, persisting under the subsequent Norman rule until the 13th century. However, only one dialect of Siculo-Arabic is still spoken: Maltese. Siculo-Arabic dialects descend from the Arabic that was introduced to Sicily following the Abbasid conquest in the 9th century, and gradually marginalized following the Norman conquest in the 11th century.

Siculo-Arabic is designated as a historical language that is attested only in writings from the 9th to the 13th centuries in Sicily. Present-day Maltese is considered to be its sole surviving descendant. Maltese evolved from one of the dialects of Siculo-Arabic over the past 800 years and a gradual process of Latinisation that gave Maltese a significant superstrate influence from Romance languages. By contrast, present-day Sicilian, which is an Italo-Dalmatian language, retains relatively little Siculo-Arabic vocabulary; its influence is limited to some 300 words.

== History ==
=== Introduction to Sicily ===
During the 7th and 8th centuries, Sicily was raided from Tunis. The eventual Muslim Arab conquest of Byzantine Sicily was piecemeal and slow. The region was a frontier zone, even after the fall of Taormina in 962, which completed the invasion. Romance languages, such as African Romance, and Byzantine Greek continued to be used in the island well after the Arabic conquest. Its speakers were largely made up of Sicilian Muslims. However, based on the foundation charter on the Church of Santa Maria dell'Ammiraglio (written in both Greek and Arabic), it can be speculated that Siculo-Arabic was also the mother tongue for many Sicilian, in this case Palermo’s, Orthodox Christians.

=== Norman kingdom of Sicily ===
When the Normans entered Sicily, the island was divided into two main non-Latin linguistic groups:

- Arabic speakers, mostly in Palermo, Agrigento, Butera, Enna and Noto
- Greek speakers, mostly in Messina, Taormina, Cefalù, Catania and Syracuse

In 1086, the Normans managed to secure the conversion of ibn Hamud, the last important Kalbid ruler of Enna. This conversion, along with the Norman adoption of many Arab governing customs resulted in the emergence of a Christian Siculo-Arabic language. During the Norman era the chancery office operated in Arabic, Greek and Latin. āẖtrāq

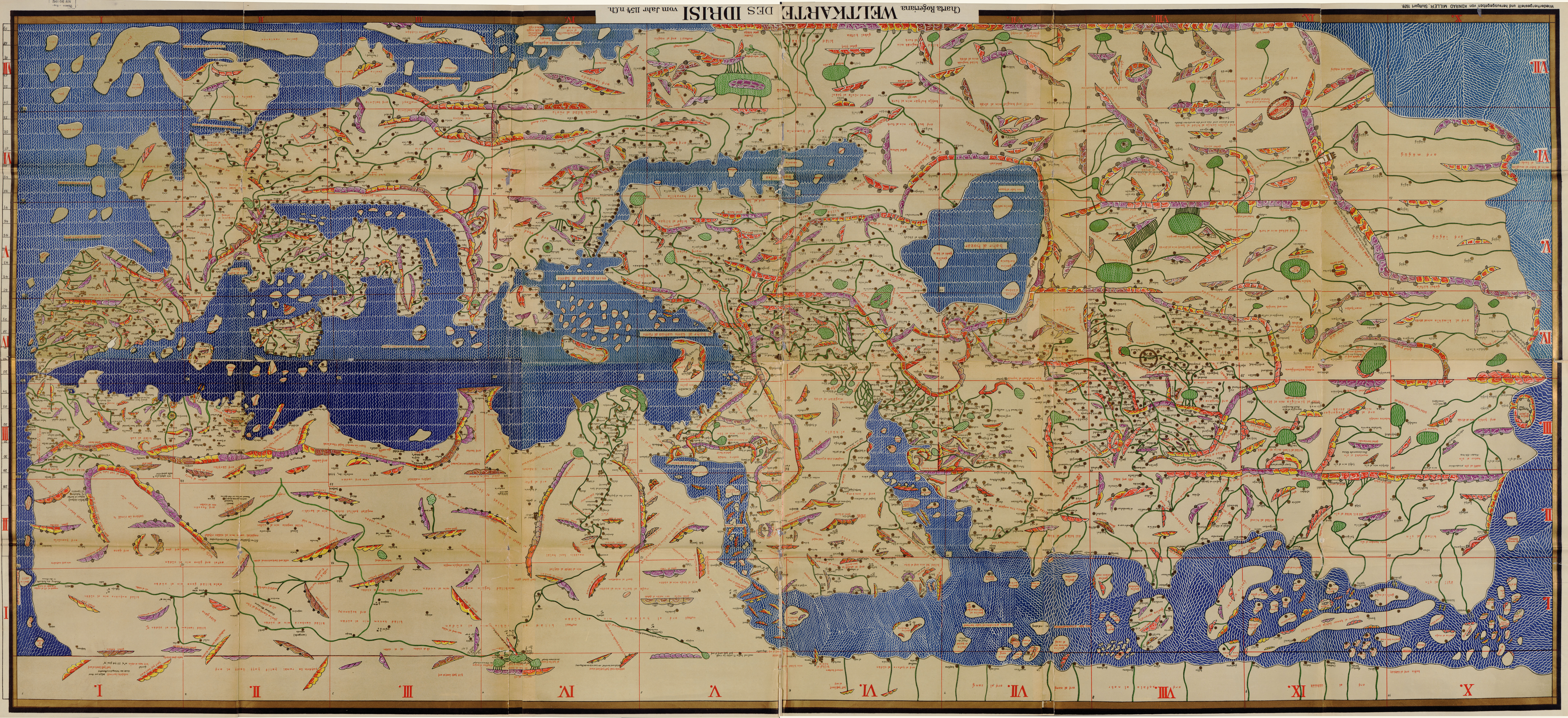
The modern copy of the Tabula Rogeriana, upside-down, with North oriented up.

The Tabula Rogeriana (Arabic: نزهة المشتاق في اختراق الآفاق, romanized: Nuzhat al-mushtāq fī Iẖtirāq al-afāq, lit. 'The Excursion of One Eager to Penetrate the Distant Horizons') is a description of the world and world map created by the Palermo-based Arab geographer Muhammad al-Idrisi in 1154. Al-Idrisi worked on the commentaries and illustrations of the map for fifteen years at the court of the Norman king Roger II of Sicily, who commissioned the work around 1138.

=== Decline after 1200 ===
In the post-conquest period, both Arabic and Greek were sometimes used by the new rulers and subsequently used in the king's fiscal administration, which managed royal lands and men in Sicily and Calabria. The many documents that it issued are among the main and most important sources for Arabic in Sicily. However, when the Hohenstaufens replaced the Normans, Arabic was dropped as a language of government in 1198 and the Hohenstaufen expelled the remaining Muslims to Lucera and North Africa in the 13th century. Due to this, the only remaining Siculo-Arabic speakers were Christians.

When the Kingdom of Aragon took Sicily in 1282, they introduced Aragonese nobility and made Latin the only official language; Greek and Arabic official records in Sicily ceased to exist by the 14th century.

Arabic influence continued in a number of Sicilian words. Most of these terms relate to agriculture and related activities.

The last non-Maltese dialect of Siculo-Arabic went extinct around the start of the 19th century if not before.

== Maltese language ==
A Maltese speaker, recorded in Malta.

The modern language derived from the Siculo-Arabic spoken in Malta is known as Maltese. While "Siculo-Arabic" refers to the language spoken before 1300, hardly any records exist from the 14th century, and the earliest record in the Maltese language is Il-Kantilena (Xidew il-Qada) by Pietru Caxaro (late 15th century), which is written in the Latin script.

Maltese evolved from Siculo-Arabic through a gradual process of Latinisation following the re-Christianisation of Malta (which was complete by 1250). Some items of Siculo-Arabic vocabulary are comparable with later items found in Maltese. Although Siculo-Arabic has had a relatively minor influence on modern-day Sicilian, this language shares many words of Arabic etymology, which may originate either in Spanish or Siculo-Arabic itself. Some examples are shown in the table;

Maltese	Sicilian (Arabic etymology)	Spanish (Arabic etymology)	Arabic (Modern Standard)	Tunisian Arabic	English
ġiebja	gebbia	aljibe	جَابِيَة (jābiya)	جِابيَة (jēbyə)	reservoir
ġulġlien	giurgiulena	ajonjolí	جُلْجُلَان (juljulān)	جِلْجْلَانْ (jeljlēn)	sesame seed
sieqja	saja	acequia	سَاقِيَة (sāqiya)	سِاقيَة (sēqyə)	canal
żagħfran	zaffarana	azafrán	زَعْفَرَان (zaʿfarān)	زعْفْرَانْ (zaʿfrān)	saffron
żahra	zàgara	azahar	زَهْرَة (zahra)	زَهرَة (zahra)	blossom
żbib	zibbibbu	acebibe	زَبِيب (zabīb)	زْبِيبْ (zbīb)	raisins

== See also ==
- Varieties of Arabic
- Tunisian Arabic
- Maghrebi Arabic
- Pantesco dialect, a dialect of Sicilian spoken on the island of Pantelleria which has Maltese / Arabic influence.
- Norman–Arab–Byzantine culture

== Sources ==
- Agius, D. A. (1996). Siculo Arabic. London: Kegan Paul International. ISBN 0-7103-0497-8.
- Johns, Jeremy (2002). Arabic Administration in Norman Sicily. The Royal Diwan. Cambridge: Cambridge University Press. ISBN 0-521-81692-0.
- Metcalfe, Alex (2003). Muslims and Christian in Norman Sicily: Arabic-speakers and the end of Islam. London and New York: Routledge. ISBN 0-7007-1685-8.
