= Lluís de Requesens (commander) =

Catalan-Aragonese naval commander

Lluís de Requesens was a commander of a Catalan-Aragonese fleet, which won a considerable victory at Pantelleria in 1311. His family became princes of Pantelleria until 1553, when the Turks captured the island.
