= Deponent =

Deponent may refer to:

- A person who makes a deposition
- Deponent verb, a verb active in meaning, but passive or middle in form
