= Latin tenses =

Tense used in the Latin language

The main Latin tenses can be divided into two groups: the present system (also known as infectum tenses), consisting of the present, future, and imperfect; and the perfect system (also known as perfectum tenses), consisting of the perfect, future perfect, and pluperfect.

To these six main tenses can be added various periphrastic or compound tenses, such as ductūrus sum 'I am going to lead', or ductum habeō 'I have led'. However, these are less commonly used than the six basic tenses.

In addition to the six main tenses of the indicative mood, there are four main tenses in the subjunctive mood and two in the imperative mood. Participles in Latin have three tenses (present, perfect, and future). The infinitive has two main tenses (present and perfect) as well as a number of periphrastic tenses used in reported speech.

Latin tenses do not have exact English equivalents, so that often the same tense can be translated in different ways depending on its context: for example, dūcō can be translated as 'I lead', 'I am leading' or 'I led', and dūxī can be translated as 'I led' and 'I have led'. In some cases Latin makes a distinction which is not made in English: for example, imperfect eram and perfect fuī both mean 'I was' in English, but they differ in Latin.

== Overview ==
=== The six main tenses ===
==== Active voice ====
The six main indicative tenses in classical Latin are the following, using the verb dūcō as an example:

(a) Infectum tenses

- Present: dūcō 'I lead, I am leading'
- Future: dūcam 'I will lead, I will be leading'
- Imperfect: dūcēbam 'I was leading, I used to lead'

(b) Perfectum tenses

- Perfect: dūxī 'I led, I have led'
- Future Perfect: dūxerō 'I will have led'
- Pluperfect: dūxeram 'I had led'

The three perfectum tenses are made using a different stem (in this case dūx- instead of dūc-). The perfect stem can usually not be guessed, and must be learnt from a dictionary.

==== Passive voice ====
There are also indicative paradigms for all six tenses in the passive voice, as follows:

(a) Infectum tenses

- Present: dūcor 'I am led, I am being led'
- Future: dūcar 'I will be led, I will be being led'
- Imperfect: dūcēbar 'I was being led, I used to be led'

(b) Perfectum tenses

- Perfect: ductus sum (ductus fuī) 'I was led, I have been led'
- Future Perfect: ductus erō (ductus fuerō) 'I will have been led'
- Pluperfect: ductus eram (ductus fueram) 'I had been led'

The perfectum system has simple tenses in the active (dūxī, dūxerō, dūxeram) and compound tenses in the passive (ductus sum, ductus erō, ductus eram). The periphrasis for the perfectum passive tenses is made of a passive perfect participle (ductus, ducta, ductum, ductī, ductae, ducta, which changes according to the gender and number of the subject) combined with different tenses of the verb sum 'I am'. The forms in brackets were rare in Classical Latin, but became more common in post-classical times. In some cases, during the classical period, a difference in meaning between the two forms can be discerned.

The order of the words in a compound tense can be inverted, e.g. sum ductus etc. If the negative adverb nōn 'not' is added, various orders are possible, e.g. nōn est ausus, ausus nōn est, nōn ausus est 'he did not dare' (the first is the most common).

==== Deponent verbs ====
Certain verbs in Latin have the form of a passive verb, but the meaning is active. These verbs are known as deponent verbs. An example is the verb sequor 'I follow':

(a) Infectum tenses

- Present: sequor 'I follow, I am following'
- Future: sequar 'I will follow, I will be following'
- Imperfect: sequēbar 'I was following, I used to follow'

(b) Perfectum tenses

- Perfect: secūtus sum (secūtus fuī) 'I followed, I have followed'
- Future Perfect: secūtus erō (secūtus fuerō) 'I will have followed'
- Pluperfect: secūtus eram (secūtus fueram) 'I had followed'

=== Periphrastic tenses ===
The so called "periphrastic conjugation" is formed from the future participle (ductūrus, ductūra, ductūrum, etc., depending on the gender and number of the subject) combined with various tenses of the verb sum 'I am'. For example:

- ductūrus sum 'I am going to lead, I am planning to lead'
- ductūrus erō 'I will be going to lead'
- ductūrus eram 'I was going to lead, I was planning to lead'
- ductūrus fuī 'I was going to lead'

and so on. Examples are given below.

A passive periphrastic conjugation can be made using a gerundive instead of a participle. This usually has a necessitative meaning such as 'need' or 'have to':

- dūcendus sum 'I need to be led'
- dūcendus erō 'I will need to be led'
- dūcendus eram 'I needed to be led'

and so on. The gerundive also changes according to the number and gender of the subject (dūcenda, dūcendum, dūcendī, dūcendae etc.

A third type of periphrastic conjugation, which eventually developed into the perfect or pluperfect tenses in Romance languages such as Italian and French, is formed from the accusative perfect participle (ductum, ductam, ductōs etc., according to the gender and number of the object) combined with various tenses of habeō 'I have', for example:

- ductum habeō 'I have led'
- ductum habēbō 'I will have led'
- ductum habēbam 'I had led'

=== Archaic forms ===
Occasionally, especially in poetry, there occur archaic forms which don't conform to the usual patterns of tense formation. These include futures or future perfects with -s- such as iussō 'I will have ordered', faxō 'I will ensure'; subjunctives with -s- such as ausim 'I would dare', faxim 'I would do'; archaic subjunctives such as siem, fuam or duim; infinitives in -ier or -assere such as vituperarier or impetrāssere; shortened perfect or pluperfect forms such as dīxe (for dīxisse), ērēpsēmus (for ērēpsissēmus), vīxet (for vīxisset) etc. These are discussed below.

== Indicative ==
=== Present ===
==== Formation ====
The present tense of regular verbs is formed in different ways according to the conjugation of the verb.

- 1st conjugation: amō 'I love' (-ō, -ās, -at, -āmus, -ātis, -ant)
- 2nd conjugation: videō 'I see' (-eō, -ēs, -et, -ēmus, -ētis, -ent)
- 3rd conjugation (-ō): dūcō 'I lead' (-ō, -is, -it, -imus, -itis, -unt)
- 3rd conjugation (-iō): capiō 'I capture' (-iō, is, -it, -imus, -itis, -iunt)
- 4th conjugation: audiō 'I hear' (-iō, -īs, -it, -īmus, -ītis, -iunt)

The six endings in brackets mean 'I, you (singular), he/she/it, we, you (plural), they' respectively. Thus amās means 'you (sg.) love', amat 'he/she/it loves' and so on.

Irregular verbs:

- dō I give' (dō, dās, dat, dǎmus, dǎtis, dant)
- ferō 'I bear' (ferō, fers, fert, ferimus, fertis, ferunt)
- eō 'I go' (eō, īs, it, īmus, ītis, eunt)
- volō 'I want' (volō, vīs, vult, volumus, vultis, volunt)
- sum 'I am' (sum, es, est, sumus, estis, sunt)
- possum 'I am able' (possum, potes, potest, possumus, potestis, possunt)

Passive and deponent verbs:

- 1st conjugation: amor 'I am loved' (-or, -āris/-āre, -ātur, -āmur, -āminī, -antur)
- 2nd conjugation: videor 'I am seen, I seem' (-eor, -ēris/-ēre, -ētur, -ēmur, -ēminī, -entur)
- 3rd conjugation (-ō): dūcor 'I am led' (-or, -eris/-ere, -itur, -imur, -iminī, -untur)
- 3rd conjugation (-iō): capior 'I am captured' (-ior, -eris/-ere, -itur, -imur, -iminī, -iuntur)
- 4th conjugation: audior 'I am heard' (-ior, -īris/-īre, -ītur, -īmur, -īminī, -iuntur)

==== Meanings ====
There is no distinction of aspect in the present tense: faciō can mean 'I do (now)', 'I do (regularly), or 'I am doing'; that is, it can be perfective, habitual, or progressive in aspect. Other possible meanings in certain contexts are 'I have been doing', 'I did', and 'I was doing'.

===== Current situation =====
The present tense can refer to a current situation:

senātus haec intellegit; cōnsul videt; hic tamen vīvit (Cicero)
'the Senate understands this; the Consul sees it; yet this man is still alive'

tū fortasse vērum dīcis (Cicero)
'perhaps you are telling the truth'

ubi nunc fīlius meus habitāt? (Plautus)
'where is my son living currently?'

unde īs? quid fers? quid festīnās? (Plautus)
'where are you coming from? what are you carrying? what are you hurrying for?'

===== Habitual =====
The present tense can also be used for habitual actions:

haec egō patior cōtidie (Cicero)
'I suffer these things every day'

===== General truths =====
The present, as in English, can also describe a general truth:

sōlēs occidere et redīre possunt (Catullus)
'suns can set and return again'

===== Perfective present =====
It can also be used performatively to describe an event which takes place at the moment of speaking or immediately after it:

veniō nunc ad Dorylēnsium testimōnium (Cicero)
'I come (I'll come) now to the testimony of the Dorylensians'

===== Perfect continuous meaning =====
The present can sometimes mean 'has been doing', referring to a situation that started in the past and is still continuing. In some sentences a length of time is given and the adverb iam 'now' is added:

is Lilybaeī multōs iam annōs habitat (Cicero)
'he has been living in Lilybaeum for many years now'

sex mēnsēs iam hīc nēmō habitat (Plautus)
'no one has been living here for six months now'

cīvis Rōmānus iam diū est (Cicero)
'he has been a Roman citizen for a long time now'

The present tense can also be used in this meaning when combined with a temporal clause using postquam:

tremō horreōque postquam aspexī hanc (Terence)
'I've been trembling and shivering ever since I caught sight of her'

Sometimes the postquam clause itself has the present tense:

postquam meus est, nullā mē paelice laesit (Martial)
'ever since he has been (lit. 'is') mine, he has never harmed me with a mistress'

plānē relēgātus mihī videor posteā quam in Formiānō sum (Cicero)
'I've been feeling completely out of touch ever since I've been in Formiae'

ut sumus in Pontō, ter frīgore cōnstitit Hister (Ovid)
'since I have been (lit. 'we are') in Pontus, the Danube has frozen over three times'

Another idiom is the following using the conjunction cum:

multī annī sunt cum in aere meō est (Cicero)
'he has owed me money for many years now' (lit. 'there are many years that he is in my bronze')

===== Historic present =====
The present tense is often used in narrative in a historic sense, referring to a past event, especially when the writer is describing an exciting moment in the story. This is known as the 'historic present':

videt imminēre hostēs ... capit arma ā proximīs ... (Caesar)
'he sees the enemy threatening ... he immediately seizes weapons from those next to him ...'

According to Pinkster, the historic present is the most frequent tense used in narrative in both prose and poetry.

In Caesar when a verb is placed initially in the sentence, as in the first example above (videt imminēre hostēs), it is very frequently in the present tense.

Another situation where the use of the historic present is frequent is in utterance verbs, such as fidem dant 'they give a pledge' or ōrant 'they beg'. More than half the historic presents in Caesar are of this kind.

In biographical writing, however, the perfect is used much more often than the present.

===== Imperfect meaning =====
The present tense can replace not only the perfect tense, but also sometimes the imperfect tense:

tōtīs trepidātur castrīs (Caesar)
'in the whole camp there is panic' (i.e. people were panicking)

After dum 'while', in a past context, the present indicative regularly has the meaning of an imperfect tense:

dumque fugit, tergō vēlāmina lāpsa relīquit (Ovid)
'while she was fleeing, her cloak (vēlāmina) slipped from her back (tergō) and she left it behind'

But when dum is followed by an imperfect tense it usually has the meaning 'as long as'. The difference is that in this case the two actions are co-extensive:

sēmianimēs errāre viīs, dum stāre valēbant, adspicerēs
'you could see them wandering half dead through the streets, as long as they had the strength to stand'

===== Potential meaning =====
Another idiom that can be mentioned is the phrase longum est, which means 'it would take a long time' or 'it would be tedious'. It is frequently used by Cicero as well as other writers:

longum est omnia ēnumerāre proelia (Nepos)
'it would be tedious to recount all the battles'

=== Future ===
==== Formation ====
The future indicative has various endings depending on the verb. First conjugation verbs and eō and its compounds have a future ending in -bō (passive -bor); sum and its compounds have a future ending in -erō; other verbs have a future ending in -am (passive -ar):

- 1st conjugation: amābō 'I will love' (-bō, -bis, -bit, -bimus, -bitis, -bunt)
- 2nd conjugation: vidēbō 'I will see'
- 3rd conjugation (-ō): dūcam 'I will lead' (-am, -ēs, -et, -ēmus, -ētis, -ent)
- 3rd conjugation (-iō): capiam 'I will capture' (-iam, -iēs, -iet, -iēmus, -iētis, -ient)
- 4th conjugation: audiam 'I will hear'

Irregular verbs:

- dabō 'I will give'
- feram 'I will bear'
- ībō 'I will go'
- volam 'I will want'
- erō 'I will be' (erō, eris, erit, erimus, eritis, erunt)
- poterō 'I will be able'

Passive and deponent verbs:

- 1st conjugation: amābor 'I will be loved' (-bor, -beris/-bere, -bitur, -bimur, -biminī, -buntur)
- 2nd conjugation: vidēbor 'I will be seen, I will seem'
- 3rd conjugation (-ō): dūcar 'I will be led' (-ar, -ēris/-ēre, -ētur, -ēmur, -ēminī, -entur)
- 3rd conjugation (-iō): capiar 'I will be captured'
- 4th conjugation: audiar 'I will be heard'

A future meaning can also be expressed using a periphrastic future such as ductūrus sum 'I am going to lead' (see below).

==== Meaning ====
There is no distinction in the future between perfective and imperfective aspect; as an example, dūcam can mean either 'I will lead' or 'I will be leading'.

Future event or situation

The future tense can describe an event or a situation in the near or distant future:

īnsequentī librō explicābō (Vitruvius)
'I will explain this in the next book'

ibī cotīdiē tuās litterās exspectābō (Cicero)
'when I get there, I shall be expecting your letters every day'

In subordinate clauses

A difference between Latin and English is that in subordinate clauses such as 'if this happens in future', English uses the present tense, but Latin usually uses the future.

nārrābō cum aliquid habēbō novī (Cicero)
'I will tell you when I have some news' (lit. 'I will have')

crūdam sī edēs, in acētum intinguitō (Cato)
'if (at some future time) you eat it (i.e. cabbage) raw, dip it in vinegar'

per eum quod volēmus facile auferēmus (Cicero)
'through him we shall easily get what we want' (lit. 'what we will want')

Occasionally, however, a present tense can be used in the subordinate clause referring to the future:

sī vincimus, omnia nōbīs tūta erunt (Sallust)
'if we win, everything will be safe for us'

Polite requests

The future can also be used for polite requests, as when Cicero sends greetings to his friend Atticus's wife and daughter:

Pīliae salūtem dīcēs et Atticae (Cicero)
'please give my greetings to Pilia and Attica'

=== Imperfect ===
==== Formation ====
The imperfect indicative tense of regular verbs ends in -bam or -bar in all verbs except sum and possum, when it ends in -ram.

- 1st conjugation: amābam (-bam, -bās, -bat, -bāmus, -bātis, -bant)
- 2nd conjugation: vidēbam
- 3rd conjugation (-ō): dūcēbam
- 3rd conjugation (-iō): capiēbam
- 4th conjugation: audiēbam

Irregular verbs:

- 'I was giving': dabam
- 'I was bearing': ferēbam
- 'I was going': ībam
- 'I was wanting': volēbam
- 'I was': eram (eram, erās, erat, erāmus, erātis, erant)
- 'I was able': poteram

Passive and deponent verbs:

- 1st conjugation: amābar (-bar, -bāris/-bāre, -bātur, -bāmur, -bāminī, -bantur)
- 2nd conjugation: vidēbar
- 3rd conjugation (-ō): dūcēbar
- 3rd conjugation (-iō): capiēbar
- 4th conjugation: audiēbar

==== Meaning ====
The imperfect indicative generally has an imperfective meaning and describes situations in the past. Often the imperfect can be translated into English as 'was doing', but sometimes the simple tense 'did' or expressions such as 'used to do', 'would do', 'kept doing', 'began to do', 'had been doing' are more appropriate.

Situation at a particular time

A common use of the imperfect is to describe a situation that already existed at a particular moment:

virgā, quam in manū gerēbat, circumscrīpsit rēgem (Livy)
'with a stick, which he was carrying in his hand, he drew a circle round the king'

eō cum veniō, praetor quiēscēbat (Cicero)
'when I got there, the governor was taking a nap'

ut vērō domum vēnī, iacēbat mīles meus in lectō (Petronius)
'but when I got home, my soldier was lying in bed'

(Verrēs) in forum vēnit; ārdēbant oculī (Cicero)
'(Verres) came into the forum; his eyes were burning (with anger)'

Often an expression such as tum 'then' or eō tempore 'at that time' is added:

ex equō tum forte Mettius pugnābat (Livy)
'at that time (the time of his death) by chance Mettius was fighting on horseback'

hiēms iam eō tempore erat (Livy)
'by this time it was already winter'

Poenī tum eam incolēbant (Livy)
'Carthaginians were living on the island at that time'

Vivid description

The use of the imperfect rather than the perfect can be used to make a scene more vivid, as with this sentence of Cicero's:

caedēbātur virgīs in mediō forō Messānae cīvis Rōmānus, iūdicēs (Cicero)
'a Roman citizen was being flogged with rods in the middle of the forum of Messana, judges'

The passage is commented on by Aulus Gellius. He says that the use of caedēbātur rather than caesus est creates a 'drawn-out vivid description' (diūtīna repraesentātiō); that is to say, making it seem to the audience that the scene is taking place in front of them.

So frequently in descriptions of battles, the imperfect is used to describe what was happening at a particular moment, as though seen through the eyes of an observer:

eõdem tempore equitēs ... cum sē in castra reciperent, adversīs hostibus occurrēbant ac rūrsus aliam in partem fugam petēbant (Caesar)
'at the same time the cavalrymen ... as they were returning to the camp, began running into the enemy who were coming towards them and once again began fleeing in another direction'

'Began doing'

Another meaning is inceptive, describing a situation that began at a certain moment and continued indefinitely. Often in English it is translated with 'began':

quō postquam fuga inclīnāvit, aliī in aquam caecī ruēbant, aliī dum cunctantur in rīpīs oppressī (Livy)
'after the rout began, some began rushing blindly into the water, others, while they were hesitating on the banks, were crushed'

ubī accēpit hominēs clārōs vēnisse, metū agitābātur (Sallust)
'when he heard that some important people had come, he began to agitated with alarm'

Caesar, cum in Asiam vēnisset, reperiēbat T. Ampium cōnātum esse pecūnias tollere Ephesō ex fānō Diānae (Caesar)
'after Caesar arrived in Asia, he began hearing reports that Titus Ampius had been trying to steal money from the temple of Diana in Ephesus'

Habitual use

The imperfect tense can describe a situation that used to take place regularly or habitually:

multum enim illum audiēbam (Cicero)
'I used to listen to him a lot'

But in sentences like the following, in which the verb has a quasi-negative meaning ('he didn't write as well as he spoke'), the perfect can be used:

dīcēbat melius quam scrīpsit Hortēnsius (Cicero)
'Hortensius used to speak better than he wrote'

Iterative use

Similar to the above is the iterative or 'frequentative' use of the imperfect, describing what something that kept on happening or which happened on an indefinite number of occasions:

complurīs lēgātiōnēs Pharnacēs ad Domitium mittit ... Domitius respondēbat ... ([Caesar])
'Pharnaces sent several embassies to Domitius ... (each time) Domitius would reply ...'

Geographical description

Sometimes the imperfect is used for description of the surroundings as they appeared at the time of the story:

mōns altissimus impendēbat (Caesar)
'a very high mountain hung over (the road)'

Unfinished action

Another use is to describe an action that someone was intending to do, or about to do, but which never actually took place, or which was interrupted by another event:

Cūriam relinquēbat (Tacitus)
'he was on the point of leaving the Senate house'

in amplexūs occurrentis fīliae ruēbat, nisi interiectī lictōrēs utrīsque obstitissent (Tacitus)
'he would have rushed into the embrace of his daughter, who was running towards him, if the bodyguards hadn't intervened and stood in the way of both of them'

quārtādecimānī postquam Alpibus dēgressi sunt, sēditiōsissimus quisque signa Viennam ferēbant: cōnsēnsū meliōrum conpressī et legio in Britanniam trānsvecta (Tacitus)
'after the soldiers of the 14th legion descended from the Alps, all the more rebellious men were for carrying the standards to Vienne; but they were checked by the consensus of the better men and the legion was transported across to Britain'

Pluperfect continuous meaning

When the imperfect tense is used with a length of time it means 'had done' or 'had been doing', referring to a situation which had been going on for some time and was still going on. The adverb iam 'by now' is sometimes added:

quod iam diū cupiēbant (Livy)
'which they had been desiring for a long time now'

iam complūrēs annōs possessionem Siciliae tenēbant (Nepos)
'(the Carthaginians) had been in possession of Sicily for several years by this time'

complūrēs annōs ... Athēnīs habitābat (Nepos)
'(at that time) he had been living in Athens for several years'

Philippus nūllus ūsquam nec nūntius ab eō per aliquot hōras veniēbat (Livy)
'Philip was nowhere in sight, and for several hours no messenger had arrived from him'

sine coniuge caelebs vīvēbat thalamīque diū cōnsorte carēbat (Ovid)
'he was living alone without a wife and for a long time he had lacked any partner in his bedroom'

==== Epistolary imperfect ====
Sometimes in letters a writer imagines himself in the position of the recipient and uses an imperfect tense to describe a situation which for the writer himself is present:

nostrae res meliore loco vidēbantur (Cicero)
'our affairs seem (lit. 'seemed') to be in a better place'

etenim ibī sedēns haec ad te scrībēbam (Cicero)
'as a matter of fact I am writing (lit. 'I was writing') this to you while sitting there '

tuās iam litterās Brūtus exspectābat (Cicero)
'Brutus is expecting (lit. 'was expecting') a letter from you at the moment'

Other tenses can also be used from the point of view of the reader, such as the pluperfect and the perfect in the example below:

nōndum erat audītum tē ad Italiam adventāre cum Sex. Villium ... cum hīs ad tē litterīs mīsī (Cicero)
'there was still no news of your coming to Italy when I sent Sextus Villius with this letter for you'

Potential meaning ('would be')

Sometimes the imperfect of sum is used with a potential meaning ('would be'):

omnīnō supervacua erat doctrīna, sī nātūra sufficeret (Quintilian)
'teaching would be completely superfluous, if nature was sufficient'

vehementer intererat vestrā, quī patrēs estis, līberōs vestrōs hīc potissimum discere (Pliny)
'it would be very much in your interest, those of you who are fathers, if your sons could study here rather (than in another town)'

=== Perfect ===
==== Formation ====
The perfect indicative active tense is the third principal part given in Latin dictionaries. In most verbs it uses a different stem from the present tense; for example, the perfect tense of dūcō 'I lead' is dūxī 'I led'.

- 1st conjugation: amāvī (-ī, -istī, -it, -imus, -istis, -ērunt/-ēre)
- 2nd conjugation: vīdī
- 3rd conjugation (-ō): dūxī
- 3rd conjugation (-iō): cēpī
- 4th conjugation: audīvī/audiī

The usual form of the 3rd pl is -ērunt. The ending -ēre is common in some authors, such as Livy, and in poetry. The form -ĕrunt is sometimes found in poetry.

In the 1st conjugation, the 2nd sg, 2nd pl, and 3rd pl are often contracted, for example amāstī, amāstis, amārunt. Contracted forms such as dīxtī (for dīxistī) are also sometimes found, especially in Plautus.

Irregular verbs:

- dedī 'I gave'
- tulī 'I bore'
- iī (rarely īvī) 'I went'
- voluī 'I wanted'
- fuī 'I was'
- potuī 'I was able'

Passive and deponent verbs

- 1st conjugation: amātus sum (rarely amātus fuī) 'I was loved'
- 2nd conjugation: vīsus sum (vīsus fuī)
- 3rd conjugation (-ō): ductus sum (ductus fuī)
- 3rd conjugation (-iō): captus sum (captus fuī)
- 4th conjugation: audītus sum (auditus fuī)

The forms with fuī are much less common. These forms are discussed in a separate section below.

The participle changes in gender and number to agree with the subject; for example, it can be plural or feminine:

quod iussī sunt faciunt (Caesar)
'they did what they were ordered to do'

fuērunt ... duae fīliae; hārum ūna occīsa, altera capta est (Caesar)
'there were two daughters; of these one was killed, the other captured'

The auxiliary verb with these tenses is usually placed after the participle, but sometimes precedes. This often happens when the auxiliary follows a focussed word, a quantity word, or a conjunction:

Domitius ex castrīs in montem refugiēns, ab equitibus est interfectus (Caesar)
'Domitius, while fleeing from the camp into the mountains, was killed by cavalrymen'

inde Quīnctius Corinthum est profectus (Livy)
'from there Quinctius set out for Corinth'

Sometimes the auxiliary verb est or sunt is omitted. This style is often found in the historian Livy:

Titus et Arrūns profectī; comes iīs additus L. Iūnius Brūtus (Livy)
'Titus and Arruns set out; Lucius Iunius Brutus was added to them as a travelling companion'

Not every perfect participle combined with est is a perfect tense. Thus in the examples below, the participle does not refer to any event but is merely descriptive or adjectival:

Gallia est omnis dīvīsa in partīs trīs (Caesar)
'Gaul, taken as a whole, is (i.e., can be described as) divided into three parts'

parātus erat pecūniam dare (Seneca the Elder)
'he was prepared (i.e. willing) to pay a ransom'

==== Meaning ====
Past event

The perfect most frequently narrates an event in the past. The usual translation is the simple English past tense with '-ed' or the equivalent:

vēnī, vīdī, vīcī (Caesar)
'I came, I saw, I conquered'

ibī M. Marcellum convēni eumque diem ibī cōnsūmpsī (Servius to Cicero)
'there I met Marcus Marcellus, and I spent that day there'

ūniversī ex nāvī dēsiluērunt (Caesar)
'all at the same time, they leapt down out of the ship'

The perfect passive and deponent can also be used to describe an event in the past:

annō ante mē cēnsōrem mortuus est (Cicero)
'he died in the year before I became censor'

ubī occīsus est Sex. Rōscius? – Rōmae (Cicero)
'where was Sextus Roscius murdered? – in Rome'

Present perfect meaning

The perfect active can also be used like the English present perfect ('I have done'):

ecum et mūlum Brundisī tibī relīquī (Cicero)
'I have left a horse and a mule for you at Brundisium'

nunc quidem iam abiit pestilentia (Cicero)
'the epidemic has now gone away'

hīs dē rēbus scrīpsī ad senātum (Cicero)
'I've written about these matters to the Senate'

pēnsum meum, quod datumst, cōnfēcī; nunc domum properō (Plautus)
'I have completed the task which I was given; now I'm hurrying home'

ita rēs sē habent ... perdidī spem (Plautus)
'this is the way things are ... I have lost hope'

The perfect passive and perfect deponent can be used like an English perfect tense, describing a present state resulting from an earlier event:

passer mortuus est meae puellae (Catullus)
'my girlfriend's pet sparrow is dead / has died'

The negative of the perfect often has the meaning 'has not yet done':

nōndum satis cōnstituī (Cicero)
'I haven't yet quite made my mind up'

Kal. Ian. [Kalendīs Iānuāriīs] dēbuit, adhūc nōn solvit (Cicero)
'he was due to pay the money on the 1st January, but he still hasn't paid it'

quoniam nōndum est perscrīptum senātūs cōnsultum, ex memoriā vōbīs ... expōnam (Cicero)
'since the decree of the Senate hasn't yet been published in writing, I will explain it to you from memory'

Experiential meaning

As with the English perfect, the Latin perfect can sometimes be used to relate experiences which have happened several times in the past:

cōntiōnēs saepe exclāmāre vīdī, cum aptē verba cecidissent (Cicero)
'I have often seen public meetings shout out loud when the words fell aptly (i.e. with a striking rhythm)'

ego Appium, ut saepe tēcum locūtus sum, valdē dīligō (Cicero)
'as I've often told you, I am very fond of Appius'

It can also be used with semper to describe what has always been the case:

mē semper amāstī (Cicero)
'you have always loved me'

mēcum vīvit semperque vīxit (Cicero)
'he lives with me, and has always done so'

Gnomic perfect

Similar to this is the "gnomic perfect", which states a general truth based on past experience:

nōn aeris acervus et aurī dēdūxit corpore febrīs (Horace)
'a heap of bronze and gold has never taken away fevers from the body' (i.e. doesn't take away)

nēmō repentē fuit turpissimus (Juvenal)
'no one has ever become totally shameless suddenly'

No longer existing situation

The perfect can sometimes be used to describe a situation which no longer exists:

urbs Crotō mūrum in circuitū patentem duodecim mīlia passuum habuit ante Pyrrhī in Italiam adventum (Livy)
'the city of Croton had (used to have) a wall extending for 12 miles in circuit, before Pyrrhus's arrival in Italy'

amāvit nōs quoque Daphnis (Virgil)
'Daphnis loved us too' (when he was alive)

Temporal or relative clause

After the conjunction cum, the perfect indicative often has in iterative meaning (= "whenever"). In English the present tense is often used:

dum legō, adsentior, cum posuī librum adsēnsiō omnis illa ēlābitur (Cicero)
'while I am reading, I agree, but as soon as I have put the book down all that agreement slips away'

cum hūc vēnī, hoc ipsum nihil agere dēlectat (Cicero)
'whenever I come here, this very "doing nothing" delights me'

The perfect tense is also used in temporal clauses after postquam 'after', ubi 'when', ut 'as soon as', and simulac 'as soon as'. Here English often uses the pluperfect tense:

haec ubi dīxit, ... signa canere iubet (Sallust)
'after he (had) said this, he ordered the signal to be sounded'

It is also used in a past-time relative clause referring to an anterior action where similarly English might use a pluperfect:

exercitum quem accēpit āmīsit (Cicero)
'he lost the army which he had received'

Perfect with length of time

The perfect, not the imperfect, is used when a situation is said to have lasted in the past for a certain length of time, but is now over. (The imperfect, however, with a length of time, is used for a situation which was still going on at the time referred to; see the examples above.)

nōnāgintā vīxit annōs (Cicero)
'he lived for ninety years'

Cassius tōtā vītā aquam bibit (Seneca)
'Cassius drank water throughout his whole life'

nec diū pāx Albāna mānsit (Livy)
'but the peace with Alba did not last long'

omnēs ante vōs cōnsulēs senātuī pāruērunt (Cicero)
'all the Consuls before you obeyed the Senate'

However, the phrase iam diū with the perfect tense means 'long ago':

audīvimus hoc iam diū, iūdicēs: negō quemquam esse vestrum quīn saepe audierit (Cicero)
'I heard this long ago, judges; I am sure there is none of you who hasn't often heard it'

scelus, inquam, factum est iam diū, antīquom et vetus (Plautus)
'the crime, I say, was committed long ago; it is old and ancient'

Meminī, ōdī, nōvī

Certain verbs, of which the most common are meminī 'I remember', ōdī 'I hate', and nōvī 'I know', are used in the perfect tense but have the meaning of a present tense:

meminī mē adesse (Cicero)
'I remember being present'

sī tū oblītus es, at dī meminērunt (Catullus)
'even if you have forgotten, yet the gods remember'

ōdī et amō (Catullus)
'I hate and I love'

The future perfect and pluperfect of these verbs serve as the equivalent of a future or imperfect tense: meminerō 'I will remember', memineram 'I remembered'. meminī has an imperative mementō 'remember!' There is also a subjunctive which can be used in a hortatory sense:

vīvōrum meminerīmus! (Petronius)
'let us remember the living (not the dead)!'

The verb nōvī usually means 'I know':

tē nōn nōvimus, nescīmus quī sīs, numquam tē anteā vīdimus (Cicero)
'we don't know you, we don't know who you are, we have never seen you before'

But sometimes the perfect nōvī has a past meaning, 'I became acquainted with' or 'I got to know':

sum; sed ubī tū mē nōvistī gentium aut vīdistī aut conlocūtu's? (Plautus)
'I am (the one you mentioned); but where on earth did you make my acquaintance or see me or ever converse with me?'

The perfect of cōnsuēscō, cōnsuēvī 'I have grown accustomed', is also often used with a present meaning:

quī diēs aestūs maximōs efficere cōnsuēvit (Caesar)
'this day generally makes the highest tides'

==== Eram vs fuī ====
In the verb sum 'I am', the imperfect tense eram and the perfect fuī both mean 'I was', but in Latin there is usually a difference. As with other verbs, the perfect is usually used when the length of time is mentioned:

diū ... silentium fuit (Livy)
'for a long time there was silence'

caecus multōs annōs fuit (Cicero)
'for many years he was blind'

But if the situation was still continuing at the time referred to, the imperfect is used:

equitum iam diū anceps pugna erat (Livy)
'the cavalry battle had been in doubt for a long time already (and was still in doubt)'

The perfect is also used when the sentence describes an event rather than a state:

aquae ingentēs eō annō fuērunt et Tiberis loca plāna urbis inundāvit (Livy)
'that year there were huge floods and the Tiber inundated the flat areas of the city'

fuistī igitur apud Laecam illā nocte, Catilīna! (Cicero)
'you were therefore there at Laeca's house that night, Catiline!' (i.e. you attended the meeting)

Another use of the perfect fuī is to describe a former state, emphasising that it is no longer in existence:

ego tam fuī quam vōs estis (Petronius)
'I was once just like you are'

statua Attī ... ad laevam cūriae fuit (Livy)
'there used to be a statue of Attus to the left of the senate house'

fuimus Trōes, fuit Īlium (Virgil)
'we have ceased to be Trojans; Troy is no more'

However, if a time adverb such as ōlim 'once upon a time' is added, there is no need for the perfect tense and the imperfect eram is more usual:

ōlim truncus eram fīculnus, inūtile lignum (Horace)
'once I was a fig-wood log, a useless piece of timber'

nōn sum quālis eram bonae sub regnō Cinarae (Horace)
'I am not the kind of man I was under the rule of good Cinara'

The perfect is also used in sentences such as the following, which describe a permanent state, as opposed to the imperfect, which describes a temporary one:

Samia mihī māter fuit; ea habitābat Rhodī (Terence)
'my mother was a Samian; she was living in Rhodes (at that time)'

apud Helvētiōs longē nōbilissimus fuit et dītissimus Orgetorix (Caesar)
'among the Helvetians by far the noblest and the most wealthy was Orgetorix'

According to Pinkster, the use of erat in these two examples would sound wrong. 'In both cases the reader would want to know "What happened next?"'

For geographical description, on the other hand, erat is used, describing the landscape was it was at the time of the narrative:

in eō flūmine pōns erat (Caesar)
'on that river there was a bridge'

erat ā septentriōnibus collis
'to the north there was a hill."

The use of fuit here would imply that there used to be a bridge, but that it has now gone.

The perfect must also be used with adverbs such as semel 'once', bis 'twice', ter 'three times', which imply that the situation is now over:

fuī bis in Bīthȳniā (Cicero)
'I have been in Bithynia twice'

The perfect is also used for something which has always been (or never been) the case:

numquam hostēs, semper sociī fuimus (Livy)
'we have never been enemies, always allies'

The adverb saepe, when referring to a past period of time, can have either tense:

saepe exercitibus praefuit (Nepos)
'on several occasions he was in charge of armies'

saepe tuī iūdex, saepe magister eram (Ovid)
'often I was your judge, often your teacher'

There are also some types of sentences where either tense may be used indifferently, for example when describing someone's name or character:

Manus eī nōmen erat / Dīnomenī fuit nōmen (Livy)
'his name was Manus' / 'his name was Dinomenes'

dīligēns erat imperātor / imperātor fuit summus (Nepos)
'he was a hard-working general' / 'he was an excellent general'

The equivalents of these two tenses, Spanish era and fui both meaning 'I was', still exist in Spanish and Portuguese today. (See Spanish conjugation, Portuguese verb conjugation.)

=== Future perfect ===
==== Formation ====
The future perfect active originally had a short -i-, while the perfect subjunctive had a long -ī-, but by the time of Cicero the two forms had become confused. It seems that Catullus and Cicero usually pronounced the future perfect with a long ī. Virgil has a short i for both tenses; Horace uses both forms for both tenses; Ovid uses both forms for the future perfect, but a long i in the perfect subjunctive.

- 1st conjugation: amāverō (-erō, -eris/erīs, -erit, -erimus/erīmus, -eritis/-erītis, -ērint) 'I will have loved'
- 2nd conjugation: vīderō
- 3rd conjugation (-ō): dūxerō
- 3rd conjugation (-iō): cēperō
- 4th conjugation: audīverō/audierō

Irregular verbs:

- 'I will have given': dederō
- 'I will have borne': tulerō
- 'I will have gone': ierō (rarely īverō)
- 'I will have wanted': voluerō
- 'I will have been': fuerō
- 'I will have been able': potuerō

Passive and deponent verbs

- 1st conjugation: amātus erō (rarely amātus fuerō) 'I will have been loved'
- 2nd conjugation: vīsus erō (vīsus fuerō)
- 3rd conjugation (-ō): ductus erō (ductus fuerō)
- 3rd conjugation (-iō): captus erō (captus fuerō)
- 4th conjugation: audītus erō (auditus fuerō)

==== Independent use ====
The future perfect is usually used in a sentence with sī 'if' or cum 'when' referring to future time, but it can sometimes be used on its own, as in the following sentences where it follows an imperative:

nōn sedeō istīc, vōs sedēte; ego sēderō in subselliō (Plautus)
'I'm not sitting there; you sit there, I'll sit on the bench.'

Pompōnia, tū invītā mulierēs, egō virōs accīverō (Cicero)
'Pomponia, you invite the women, and (meanwhile) I will have summoned the men'

In the following passage with a future perfect is the call of Julius Caesar's eagle-bearer to his men when their boat reached the shore of Britain in 55 BC:

'dēsilite', inquit, 'mīlitēs, nisī vultis aquilam hostibus prōdere; egō certē meum reī pūblicae atque imperātōrī officium praestiterō (Caesar)
'Jump down, soldiers,' he said, 'unless you want to betray the eagle to the enemy. I will certainly have done my own duty for the republic and the commander!'

Sometimes both halves of a sentence (main clause and subordinate) can have the future perfect:

quī Antōnium oppresserit, is bellum cōnfēcerit (Cicero)
'whoever will have crushed (i.e. crushes) Antony, will have finished the war'

satis erit dictum, si hoc ūnum adiūnxerō (Nepos)
'enough will have been said, if I add this one thing'

There is also an idiom using the future perfect of videō, where the future perfect is almost equivalent to a command:

vōs vīderītis quod illī dēbeātur (Livy)
'you must see to it what is due to that man'

==== In temporal and conditional clauses ====
More frequently the future perfect tense is found after sī 'if' or cum 'when' in clauses referring to a future time. In such sentences English uses the present tense:

moriēre, sī ēmīserīs vōcem! (Livy)
'you will die, if you utter a sound!' (lit. 'if you will have uttered')

dein, cum mīlia multa fēcerīmus, conturbābimus illa (Catullus)
'then, when we have made many thousands (of kisses), we will muddle up the accounts'

sī quid acciderit, tē certiōrem faciam statim (Cicero)
'if anything happens, I'll let you know at once'

sī profectus erit, faciam tē certiōrem (Cicero)
'if he sets out (lit. will be having set out), I will let you know'

ut sēmentum fēcerīs, ita metēs (Cicero)
'as you sow (lit. will have sown), so shall you reap'

==== Future perfect of meminī and ōdī ====
The future perfect of meminī and ōdī has a simple future meaning:

meminerō, dē istōc quiētus estō (Plautus)
'I'll remember, don't worry about that'

ōdī hominem et ōderō (Cicero)
'I hate the man, and I always will'

==== Archaic future perfect (faxō, amāssō) ====
An ancient future or future perfect is sometimes found in early Latin ending in -sō: faxō, capsō, iūssō, amāssō, occepsō. The form faxō is often found in Plautus and Terence. It means something like 'I will make sure' or 'assuredly'. In Plautus it is often followed by a future indicative:

faxō iam sciēs (Plautus)
'assuredly you will know now'

But it can also be followed by a present subjunctive:

faxō ut sciās (Plautus)
'I will see to it that you know'

The 2nd person ends in -is. The metre in the following example (a repeated u u – u –) shows that the -i- is short in the indicative, whereas the subjunctive has a long -i-:

si effexis hoc, soleās tibī dabō, et ānulum in digitō aureum (Plautus)
'if you manage this, I'll give you some slippers, and a gold ring on your finger'

Apart from faxō the tense is rarely used in later Latin; but iussō occurs in Virgil:

cētera, quā iussō, mēcum manus īnferat arma (Virgil)
'the rest of the group should come with me and bring their weapons where I shall have ordered'

Quoting the above line, Seneca comments that iussō is equivalent to a future perfect:

dīcēbant antīquī "sī iussō", id est "iusserō" (Seneca)
'people in the old days used to say sī iussō, that is, iusserō'

According to Lindsay, this tense ending in -sō corresponds to the Greek future tense ending in -σω. It is connected with the subjunctive ending in -sim and the future infinitive in -āssere, described below.

=== Pluperfect ===
==== Formation ====
The pluperfect active is formed using the perfect stem (e.g. dūx-) with the endings -eram, -erās, -erat, -erāmus, -erātis, -erant, e.g. dūxeram 'I had led'

The passive and deponent are usually formed using a perfect participle together with the imperfect tense of sum, e.g. ductus eram 'I had been led', locūtus eram 'I had spoken'. But there is another pluperfect passive (often with a different meaning), ductus fueram, which is discussed in a separate section below.

As with the perfect passive, the pluperfect passive tense can also have the auxiliary before the participle:

Cispius quō erat missus celeriter pervēnit ([Caesar])
'Cispius quickly reached the place to which he had been sent'

==== Meaning ====
The pluperfect represents any meaning which the perfect tense can have, but transferred to a reference time in the past.

Prior event

The pluperfect can be used as in English to describe an event that had happened earlier than the time of the narrative:

quae gēns paucīs ante mēnsibus ad Caesarem lēgātōs mīserat (Caesar)
'this nation had sent ambassadors to Caesar a few months previously'

eādem quā vēnerat viā Elatīam rediit (Livy)
'he returned to Elatia by the same way he had come'

prīdiē quam ego Athēnās vēnī Mytilēnās profectus erat (Cicero)
'on the day before I arrived in Athens he had departed for Mytilene'

Situation at a time in the past

Often the pluperfect can be used to describe the situation prevailing at a certain moment:

abierant cēterī; Clītus ultimus sine lūmine exībat (Curtius)
'the others had already departed; Clitus was going out last, without a light'

nec Philippus segnius – iam enim in Macedoniam pervēnerat – apparābat bellum (Livy)
'nor was Philip, who had arrived by now in Macedonia, preparing war less energetically'

complūrēs erant in castrīs ex legiōnibus aegrī relictī (Caesar)
'several men from the legions had been left behind in the camp sick'/
(or) 'there were several men from the legions in the camp who had been left behind because they were sick'

No longer existing situation

Just as the perfect tense can sometimes describe a situation that no longer exists at the present time (e.g. fuit Īlium), so the pluperfect can describe a situation which no longer existed at a time in the past, as in the following example:

flūmen, quod mediō oppidō flūxerat, extrā frequentia tēctīs loca praeterfluēbat (Curtius)
'the river, which had once flowed (been flowing) though the middle of the town, was now flowing past outside the built-up area'

Pluperfect in temporal clauses

In subordinate clauses of the type 'whenever...', 'whoever...' etc. in past time the pluperfect indicative is used if the event precedes the event of the main clause. Usually in English the simple past is used:

cum rosam vīderat tum incipere vēr arbitrābātur (Cicero)
'it was only whenever he saw a rose that he thought that spring was beginning'

cōnfectō itinere cum ad aliquod oppidum vēnerat, eādem lectīcā ūsque in cubiculum dēferēbātur (Cicero)
'at the end of the journey, whenever he came to some town, he would be carried in the same litter straight into his bedroom'

In later writers such as Livy, the pluperfect subjunctive is used in a similar context.

Potential meaning ('would have')

Sometimes in a conditional clause a pluperfect indicative can have the meaning of a potential pluperfect subjunctive ('would have'), when it refers to an event which very nearly took place, but did not:

perāctum erat bellum, sī Pompeium Brundisiī opprimere potuisset (Florus)
'the war would have been completely finished, if (Caesar) had been able to crush Pompey at Brundisium'

Pluperfect of meminī, ōdī, nōvī

The pluperfect of ōdī, nōvī and meminī has the meaning of an imperfect:

meminerant ad Alesiam magnam sē inopiam perpessōs (Caesar)
'they remembered how they had put up with a great shortage at Alesia'

ōderam multō peius hunc quam illum ipsum Clōdium (Cicero)
'I hated this man even more than I hated Clodius himself'

nōn nōverat Catilīnam; Āfricam tum praetor ille obtinēbat (Cicero)
'he did not know Catiline, since the latter was at that time governor of Africa'

=== Passive tenses with fuī, fuerō, fueram ===
Alongside the regular perfect passive tenses described in the previous section, there exists a second set of passive and deponent tenses made with fuī, fuerō and fueram. These are referred to as 'double perfectum forms' by de Melo. In early Latin, they seem to be slightly more common in deponent verbs than in passive ones, though in later Latin this difference is not found.

In classical Latin, although these tenses occur, they are only rarely used. In Plautus and Terence the perfect passive or deponent with fuī occurs 25 times compared with 1383 of the regular forms, and the pluperfect indicative with fueram 9 times compared with the regular pluperfect 11 times. In Cicero they are rarer still: the numbers of examples of the six tenses above are 1, 6, 5, 5, 5, 2 respectively.

The history of the perfect with fuī is different from the other tenses. For a long time it was rarely used. It remained rare in the Augustan period and does not occur at all in the travelogue of the pilgrim Egeria (4th century AD). Later, however, in the 7th-century Chronicle of Fredegar, it became more common. In modern Spanish and Portuguese, it is the regular way of forming the past tense passive (e.g. Spanish fue matado en la guerra 'he was killed in the war', Portuguese foi construído em 1982 'it was built in 1982').

The pluperfect indicative with fueram and future perfect with fuerō, on the other hand, were used more often in classical Latin: in the Augustan-period writers Hyginus and Vitruvius they even outnumber the normal tenses, and in the travelogue of the pilgrim Egeria (4th century AD), they completely replaced them.

In the examples below, in cases where there is contrast of tenses, the verb with fuit generally refers to an earlier situation than the verb with est. According to Woodcock, this is clearly a factor in the choice of tense. Often the correct nuance can be obtained by adding the word 'earlier' or 'previously'. In some cases, however, there is little difference in meaning from the ordinary perfect or pluperfect tense.

For the double perfect infinitive, see § Perfect infinitive with fuisse below.

==== Ductus fuī ====
The perfect passive or deponent tense with fuī in some cases refers to an earlier time than the time of another event mentioned. Woodcock quotes the following example:

prior nātus fuit Sophoclēs quam Eurīpidēs (Gellius)
'Sophocles was born before Euripides (was born)'

An English pluperfect tense is sometimes appropriate for translating this Latin tense:

Atreī fīliī, quī Pelope nātus fuit (Cicero)
'sons of Atreus, who (himself) was born (had been born) from Pelops'

In the following examples, the double perfect refers to a situation which existed a long time earlier, before Ovid was exiled:

mōvit amīcitiae tum tē cōnstantia longae, ante tuōs ortūs quae mihi coepta fuit (Ovid)
'you were moved at that time by the constancy of a long friendship, which began for me even before you were born'

utque fuī solitus, sēdissem forsitan ūnus dē centum iūdex in tua verba virīs (Ovid)
'and as I was once accustomed (before I was exiled), I would perhaps have sat, one of a hundred men, as a judge of your words'

However, according to de Melo it is not always possible to tell from the context whether the tense with fuī refers to an anterior time or is merely a stylistic variation of an ordinary perfect passive. He contrasts the following two sentences, the first of which is made with sum and refers to a very recent time; the second is made with fuī and may refer to a time earlier than the following verb but this is not certain (the speaker goes on to say that after sailing to Egypt he sailed round the most distant coasts, ōrās ultimās sum circumvectus):

vectus hūc sum; etiam nunc nauseō (Plautus)
'I came here on a boat; I am still feeling seasick'

in Aegyptum hīnc vectus fuī (Plautus)
'I (originally) sailed from here to Egypt'

In the following examples, both from the same scene, the meaning of the double perfect passive seems to be the equivalent of an ordinary perfect active:

quod fuī iūrātus, fēcī (Plautus)
'what I swore that I would do, I have done'

quod mandāstī, fēcī (Plautus)
'what you ordered, I have done'

Similarly, the following two examples use different tenses, although the context is very similar and the meaning is the same:

est quod domī dīcere paene fuī oblītus (Plautus)
'there's something which I almost forgot to say (earlier) in the house (i.e. before we left the house)'

oblītus intus dūdum tibi sum dīcere (Plautus)
'I forgot to tell you when we were inside just now'

However, only the sum form can be used in sentences like the following where the verb has a present perfect meaning:

nesciõ ... oblītus sum omnia (Plautus)
'I don't know ... I've forgotten everything'

In some cases, the perfect participle accompanied by fuī is merely adjectival, and does not describe any particular event. Thus in the following example, according to the 19th-century grammarian Madvig, the words clausus fuit do not describe an event but the state in which the temple of Janus was in:

bis deinde post Numae regnum clausus fuit (Livy)
'since Numa's reign the temple of Janus has been in a closed state only twice'

The perfect indicative with fuī is not used by Cicero except in the following example, where the participles are adjectival. It refers to a previous situation which has now changed:

omnia ferē, quae sunt conclūsa nunc artibus, dispersa et dissipāta quondam fuērunt (Cicero)
'almost all the things which have now been included in the Arts were once dispersed and scattered'

Often, especially from the Augustan period onwards, this tense had no particular anterior meaning but was a mere variation of the perfect passive with sum. De Melo cites the following example, where the second verb is obviously not anterior to the first:

pictūrae excīsae inclūsae sunt in ligneīs fōrmīs et in comitium ... fuērunt allātae (Vitruvius)
'the pictures having been cut out were packed in wooden crates and were brought into the comitium'

In the Vulgate Bible (4th century A.D.), just as with Cicero, the perfect indicative with fuī is only very rarely used compared with the other double tenses. An example is the following:

neque ausus fuit quisquam ex illā diē eum amplius interrogāre
'and after that day no one dared to ask him any questions any more'

==== Ductus fuerō ====
The following example, quoted by Woodcock, contrasts the two passive future perfect tenses. There is a clear difference in time between the two verbs:

quod tibī fuerit persuāsum, huīc erit persuāsum (Cicero)
'whatever has (first) proved acceptable to you will be acceptable to him'

==== Ductus fueram ====
In the following examples, a distinction is made between an earlier situation, expressed by the pluperfect with fuerat, and a later situation, expressed by the ordinary pluperfect with erat:

pōns, quī fuerat tempestāte interruptus, paene erat refectus (Caesar)
'the bridge, which (earlier on) had been broken by a storm, had now almost been rebuilt'

tumultus quidem Gallicus et Ligustīnus, quī prīncipiō eius annī exortus fuerat, haud magnō cōnātū brevī oppressus erat (Livy)
'indeed a rebellion in Gaul and Liguria, which had arisen earlier on at the beginning of that year, had soon been suppressed without much effort'

In the following, the double pluperfect is similarly contrasted with an ordinary active pluperfect. In each case the situation resulting from the double pluperfect verb no longer applies, while the situation resulting from the ordinary pluperfect still holds true:

frūmenta enim, quae fuerant intrā mūnītiōnēs sata, consūmpserant (Caesar)
'for by this time they had used up the corn which had earlier been sown inside the defence walls

nec enim adhūc exciderat cocus ille, qui oblītus fuerat porcum exinterare (Petronius)
'nor had that cook yet slipped my mind, who had earlier on forgotten to gut the piglet'

In the following examples, the pluperfect with fuerat is used similarly to refer to an earlier situation which later changed, while the later situation is expressed by the perfect tense:

sed arx Crotōnis, .... sitū tantum nātūrālī quondam mūnīta, posteā et mūrō cīncta est, quā per āversās rūpēs ab Dionȳsio Siciliae tyrannō per dolum fuerat capta. (Livy)
'But the citadel of Croton, which had formerly been defended only by its natural situation, was later surrounded by a wall as well, in the place where it had once been captured by Dionysius the tyrant of Sicily through trickery by means of the cliffs on the far side'

arma quae fīxa in pariētibus fuerant, ea sunt humī inventa (Cicero)
'the weapons which had (previously) been fixed on the walls were found on the ground'

parte alterā pugnae Paulus, quamquam prīmō statim proeliō fundā graviter ictus fuerat, tamen occurrit saepe cum cōnfertīs Hannibalī (Livy)
'in the second half of the fight, Paulus, although (earlier on) right at the beginning of the battle he had been seriously wounded by a sling-shot, nonetheless several times went on to attack Hannibal, with his soldiers in close formation'

quod Īdibus fuerat dictum dē agrō Campānō āctum īrī, nōn est āctum (Cicero)
'as for what had been said (earlier) on the Ides that a debate would be held on the Campanian farmland, in the end it didn't take place'

The following example looks back to a conversation which had taken place at an earlier time and in another place:

ex quō ego vēnī ad ea quae fuerāmus ego et tū inter nōs dē sorōre in Tusculānō locūtī (Cicero)
'after this I came to those things which (earlier on) you and I had spoken about together in my Tusculan villa concerning your sister'

The following refers to a time in the distant past:

domō eādem fuit contentus, quā Eurysthenēs, prōgenitor maiōrum suōrum, fuerat ūsus (Nepos)
'he was content to live in the same house that Eurysthenes, the forefather of his ancestors, had once used'

With this tense it is usually unnecessary to add an expression meaning 'earlier', since this meaning is implied in the tense itself, but in the following example it is made explicit with the words superiōre tempore 'at an earlier time':

vultū atque sermōne quō superiōre tempore ūsus fuerat dum dormītum īsset, ferrum intrō clam in cubiculum tulit atque ita sē trāiēcit ([Caesar])
'and with the same facial expression and manner of speech which he had been accustomed to use previously whenever he went to bed, he secretly took a sword into his bedroom and stabbed himself with it'

In the following the meaning 'previously' or 'earlier on' is not explicit, but would fit the context:

lūcernam forte oblītus fueram exstinguere (Plautus)
'by chance (earlier on) I had forgotten to extinguish the lamp'

vīdī tē ... quaecumque in mē fuerās mentīta fatērī (Propertius)
'I saw you (in a dream) confessing all the things which you had previously lied to me about'

=== Tenses with future participle ===
==== Ductūrus sum ====
The future participle with the present tense of sum is known as the periphrastic future. It describes a person's intention at the present time. It can be translated with 'going to', 'planning to', 'intending to', or by using the future continuous 'I'll be doing':

Paulla Valeria ... nūptūra est D. Brūtō (Cicero)
'Paulla Valeria is going to marry Decimus Brutus'

nisī explicātā solūtiōne nōn sum discessūrus (Cicero)
'I'm not going to leave until the money is paid'

==== Ductūrus erō ====
Despite its name, the future periphrastic tense factūrus sum is really a present tense, describing a person's present intentions. For this reason, it can have a future form ductūrus erō, used for example in future conditional or future temporal clauses:

tu tamen sī quid cum Sīliō, vel illō ipsō diē quō ad Siccam ventūrus erō, certiōrem mē velim faciās (Cicero)
'but if you come to any arrangement with Silius, even if it is on the very day I'll be arriving at Sicca's house, please let me know'

clāmābat tumidīs audāx Lēandros in undīs: / "mergite mē, fluctūs, cum reditūrus erō" (Martial)
'daring Leander was shouting in the swelling waves: "drown me, waves, when I'll be coming back"'

==== Ductūrus eram ====
A past version of the periphrastic future can be made with the imperfect tense of sum, describing what someone's intentions were at a moment in the past:

posterō diē ille in Italiam versus nāvigātūrus erat (Servius to Cicero)
'on the next day he was intending to sail to Italy'

ut vērō vultūs et cornua vīdit in undā, 'mē miserum!' dictūrus erat: vōx nūlla secūta est (Ovid)
'when she saw her face and horns in the water, "o poor me!" she was going to say, but no words came out'

In a conditional sentence this tense can mean 'would have done':

ēmendātūrus, sī licuisset, eram (Ovid)
'I was going to remove the faults (i.e. I would have removed them), if I had been free to do it'

==== Ductūrus fuī ====
Although less common than the periphrastic future with eram, the perfect tense version of the periphrastic future is also found:

quō diē repulsus est, lūsit, quā nocte peritūrus fuit, lēgit (Seneca)
'on the day Cato was defeated in the election, he played; on the night he was going to die, he read'

This tense can also be potential, expressing the meaning 'would have done':

sī tibī nōn pāruissem, iūre datūrus fuī poenās (Curtius)
'if I had not obeyed you, I would rightly have paid the penalty'

==== Ductūrus fueram ====
An example of this tense is the following:

quem senātus dictātōrem dīcī iussūrus fuerat (Livy)
'... whom the Senate had been intending to order should be declared dictator'

=== Tenses with the gerundive ===
==== Dūcendus sum ====
The gerundive of the verb (an adjectival form ending in -ndus) can be combined with the verb sum 'I am' to make a passive periphrastic tense. This usually expresses what is needing to be done:

ego nec rogandus sum nec hortandus (Pliny)
'I don't need to be asked or encouraged' (i.e. I will do it willingly)

hī tumōres incīdendī sunt (Celsus)
'tumours of this kind need to be lanced'

Negative meaning

The negative gerundive usually means 'not needing to be', as in the first example above or the first example below. However, sometimes the interpretation 'ought not to be' or 'it isn't possible for it to be' is more appropriate:

illud enim iam nōn es admonendus nēminem bonum esse nisī sapientem (Seneca)
'you do not need to be reminded now that no one is good except the wise man'

Callimachī numerīs nōn est dīcendus Achillēs (Ovid)
'the story of Achilles shouldn't (or can't) be told using the metre of Callimachus'

Impersonal construction

Very often the passive periphrastic is used impersonally, together with a dative of the agent:

vōbīs hodiernō diē cōnstituendum est (Cicero)
'a decision needs to be made by you today'

The impersonal form of this tense can also be made using intransitive verbs such as eō 'I go' and verbs such as persuādeō 'I persuade' and ūtor 'I use' which do not take an accusative object:

nōn est respondendum ad omnia (Cicero)
'there is no need to reply to everything'

mihī Arpīnum eundum est (Cicero)
'I have to go to Arpinum'

tuō tibī iūdiciō est ūtendum (Cicero)
'you must use your judgement'

==== Dūcendus erō ====
An example of a future gerundive periphrastic is the following:

quoniam id quidem non potest, ōrandus erit nōbīs amīcus meus, M. Plaetōrius (Cicero)
'since that isn't possible, we will need to ask my friend, Marcus Plaetorius'

==== Dūcendus eram ====
An example of the imperfect passive periphrastic is the following:

timēbat, nōn ea sōlum quae timenda erant, sed omnia (Cicero)
'he was afraid not only of those things which needed to be feared, but everything'

==== Dūcendus fuī ====
As with the active perfect periphrastic, in a conditional sentence the perfect gerundive periphrastic tense can mean 'would have done':

sī ūnum diem morātī essētis, moriendum omnibus fuit (Livy)
'if you had delayed just one day, you would all have died'

Another meaning of the perfect passive is 'ought to have been done':

aut exercitus adimendus aut imperium dandum fuit (Cicero)
'either his army should have been taken away or the command should have been given to him'

In the following result clause, this tense becomes subjunctive:

dē Pomptīnō rēctē scrībis. est enim ita ut, sī ante Kal. Iūniās Brundisī futūrus sit, minus urgendī fuerint M. Anneius et L. Tullius (Cicero)
'what you write about Pomptinus is correct: for the fact is that, if he is going to be in Brundisium before the 1st June, it wasn't so necessary for Marcus Anneius and Lucius Tullius to have been urged to hurry'

==== Dūcendus fuerō ====
The active future perfect periphrastic tense is not found, but the passive occurs:

cum aedificandum fuerit, ante biennium ea saxa eximantur (Vitruvius)
'whenever (at some future time) it is necessary for a building to be made (using local stone), the stones for it should be quarried two years in advance'

==== Gerundive of time only ====
Occasionally the gerundive has the meaning of a simple future passive, without any sense of obligation. However, this is generally only found in post-classical Latin, as in the following examples from Eutropius (4th century AD) and the Historia Augusta (4th or 5th century AD):

Hannibal, cum trādendus Rōmānīs esset, venēnum bibit (Eutropius)
'when Hannibal was about to be handed over to the Romans, he drank poison'

comperit adoptandum sē ā Trāiānō esse (Hist. Aug.)
'he found out that he was going to be adopted by Trajan'

For other examples of gerundive infinitive tenses see § Gerundive infinitives below.

=== Perfect tenses with habeō ===
==== Ductum habeō ====
Occasionally a perfect tense is made using the perfect participle combined with various tenses of the verb habeō 'I have'. This became the regular way of forming the perfect tense in French and Italian.

According to Gildersleeve and Lodge, this form of the perfect 'is not a mere circumlocution for the Perfect, but lays particular stress on the maintenance of the result'. However, in some cases it can be translated simply as a perfect tense in English:

ratiōnes Erōtis, etsī ipsum nondum vīdī, tamen ex litterīs eius prope modum cognitās habeō (Cicero)
'As for Eros's accounts, although I haven't seen him in person, I have more or less learnt what they say from his letter'

Clōdī animum perspectum habeō, cognitum, iūdicātum (Cicero)
'I have now thoroughly examined, learnt, and judged Clodius's mind'

In later Latin this construction became more common, for example:

ecce episcopum ... invītātum habēs et vix nōbīs supersunt quattuor vīnī amphorae (Gregory of Tours, 6th century)
'you have invited the Bishop, and we have scarcely four jars of wine left!'

A variation with teneō 'I hold or keep' is also sometimes found, but usually with emphasis on the idea of holding:

populī Rōmānī exercitus Cn. Pompeium circumsedet, fossā et vallō saeptum tenet, fugā prohibet (Cicero)
'an army of the Roman people is besieging Gnaeus Pompey, is keeping him fenced in (has fenced him in) with a ditch and wall, and preventing him from fleeing'

==== Ductum habēbō ====
The future perfect of this idiom is made with habēbō:

sed iam dē epistulīs satis dictum habēbō, sī hoc ūnum addiderō (Apuleius)
'but I will have said enough about the letters if I add this one thing'

==== Ductum habēbam ====
A pluperfect can similarly be made using one of the three past tenses of habeō:

Caesar equitātum omnem quem ex omnī prōvinciā coāctum habēbat praemittit (Caesar)
'Caesar sent ahead all the cavalry which he had gathered together from the whole province'

cultrum, quem sub veste abditum habēbat, eum in corde dēfīgit (Livy)
'a knife, which she had hidden / was keeping hidden under her clothing, she stabbed it in her heart'

ad eās mūnītiōnēs Caesar Lentulum Marcellīnum quaestōrem ... positum habebat (Caesar)
'Caesar had placed Lentulus Marcellinus the quaestor in charge of those defences'

==== Ductum habuī ====
in montibus castra habuit posita Pompeius in cōnspectū utrōrumque oppidōrum (de Bello Hispaniensi)
'Pompeius had placed a camp in the mountains within sight of both towns'

==== Ductum habueram ====
itaque nāvīs omnīs quās parātās habuerant ad nāvigandum prōpugnātōribus īnstrūxērunt (de Bello Alexandrino)
'and so they drew up and manned with fighters all the ships which they had earlier got ready for sailing'

In some sentences, however, the participle is simply adjectival, and does not form a tense with habeo, for example:

is ... frātrem habuerat prōscrīptum (Cicero)
'this man had had a brother who had been proscribed (outlawed)'

== Subjunctive ==
=== Present ===
Formation

Active verbs form their present subjunctive in -em, -am, or -im, depending on the verb, as follows:

- 1st conjugation: amem (-em, -ēs, -et, -ēmus, -ētis, -ent)
- 2nd conjugation: videam (-am, -ās, -at, -āmus, -ātis, -ant)
- 3rd conjugation (-ō): dūcam
- 3rd conjugation (-iō): capiam
- 4th conjugation: audiam

Irregular verbs:

- dō 'I give': dem
- ferō 'I bear': feram
- eō 'I go': eam
- volō 'I want': velim (-im, -īs, -it, -īmus, -ītis, -int)
- nōlō 'I don't want': nōlim
- mālō 'I prefer': mālim
- sum 'I am': sim
- possum 'I am able': possim

Passive and deponent verbs:

- 1st conjugation: amer (-er, -ēris/-ēre, -ētur, -ēmur, -ēminī, -entur)
- 2nd conjugation: videar (-ar, -āris/-āre, -ātur, -āmur, -āminī, -antur)
- 3rd conjugation (-ō): dūcar
- 3rd conjugation (-iō): capiar
- 4th conjugation: audiar

The subjunctive mood has a variety of uses in Latin. It can be optative (used in wishes), jussive ('should', 'is to'), or potential ('would', 'could', 'may', 'might'). It is also frequently used in indirect speech, in causal clauses, in circumstantial clauses after cum 'when' in past time, and when imagining a hypothetical situation. The negative of the potential subjunctive is nōn, and the negative of the optative and jussive subjunctive is nē.

==== Wishes and commands ====
The present subjunctive very frequently describes an event which the speaker wishes, commands, or suggests should happen at a future time:

utinam illam diem videam! (Cicero)
'I hope I may see that day!'

vīvāmus, mea Lesbia, atque amēmus (Catullus)
'let's live, my Lesbia, and let's love'

sedeat hīc (Gellius)
'let him sit here!'

The negative of this meaning is nē:

nē vīvam sī sciō (Cicero)
'may I not live if I know!'

exeant, proficīscantur, nē patiantur dēsideriō suī Catilīnam miserum tābēscere (Cicero)
'let them go out, let them depart; let them not allow poor Catiline to waste away with desire for them!'

Usually, the jussive subjunctive is used in the 2nd person only when the person is indefinite:

exoriāre, aliquis nostrīs ex ossibus ultor! (Virgil)
'may you arise, some avenger, from our bones!'

However, in the following example from Plautus, the 2nd person is used for politeness when a young slave girl is talking to a man:

(Trachāliō:) ego eo intrō, nisi quid vīs. – (Ampelisca:) eās. (Plautus)
'I'm going inside, unless there's anything you want.' – 'Please go.'

In the following, the speaker is talking to himself:

miser Catulle, dēsinās ineptīre! (Catullus)
'wretched Catullus, you should stop being foolish!'

The present subjunctive is also used in deliberative questions (which are questions which expect an imperative answer):

dē Pompeiō quid agam? (Cicero)
'what action should I take about Pompey?'

Another use of the present subjunctive is concessive:

sit fūr; ... at est bonus imperātor (Cicero)
'he may be a thief; nonetheless he is a good general!'

In philosophical discourse, the present subjunctive represents a hypothetical situation which is imagined as happening at an indefinite time:

vēndat aedēs vir bonus (Cicero)
'let us suppose that a good man is selling a house'

==== Potential use ====
In an 'ideal' conditional clause, the speaker imagines a hypothetical event or situation in the future. The negative of this meaning is nōn:

hanc viam sī asperam esse negem, mentiar (Cicero)
'if I were to deny that this road is a rough one, I would be lying'

haec sī tēcum patria loquātur, nōnne impetrāre debeat? (Cicero)
'if your country were to say this to you, wouldn't it be right for her to be granted her request?'

In early Latin, a present subjunctive can also be used to make an unreal conditional referring to the present:

haud rogem tē, sī sciam (Plautus)
'I wouldn't be asking you, if I knew'

However, there was a gradual shift in usage, and in the classical period, and even sometimes in Plautus, the imperfect subjunctive is used in such clauses.

Occasionally in poetry a present subjunctive can be used to refer to an unreal past event, where in prose a pluperfect subjunctive would be used in both halves of the sentence:

nī docta comes admoneat, inruat et frūstrā ferrō dīverberet umbrās (Virgil)
'if his learned companion had not warned him, Aeneas would have rushed in and would have beaten aside the ghosts with his sword in vain'

In a conditional clause of comparison ('as if...') the use of tenses is different from the normal unreal conditional clause. Here the main clause is in the indicative or imperative, and the 'if'-clause follows the sequence of tenses rule, with present or perfect subjunctive for an imaginary present situation, and imperfect or pluperfect for an imaginary past one:

nōlī timēre quasi assem elephantō dēs (Quintilian)
'don't be nervous as if you were giving a penny to an elephant'

ūtor tam bene quam mihī parārim
'I use them just as well as (if) I had bought them for myself'

When a conditional sentence expresses a generalisation, the present subjunctive is used for any 2nd person singular verb, whether in the subordinate clause or the main clause:

ferrum sī exerceās conteritur (Cato)
'if you use iron a lot, it gets worn away'

(senectūs) plēna est voluptātis, sī illā sciās ūtī (Seneca)
'old age is full of pleasure, if you know how to enjoy it'

quom inopia est, cupiās (Plautus)
'whenever there's a shortage of something, you want it'

==== In indirect speech ====
One of the most common uses of the subjunctive is to indicate reported speech (or implied reported speech). After a present tense main verb, the present subjunctive is usual, for example in the following indirect command:

nūntium mittit ut veniant (Livy)
'she sends a messenger (to say) that they should come'

When a question is made indirect, the verb is always changed into the subjunctive mood, as in the following example:

quārē id faciam, fortasse requīris? (Catullus)
'do you perhaps ask why I do that?'

After dubitō quīn, if the context is clearly future, a present or imperfect subjunctive can sometimes represent a future tense or potential subjunctive:

haec sī ēnūntiāta Ariovistō sint, nōn dubitāre quīn dē omnibus supplicium sūmat (Caesar)
'(they said that) if these things were reported to Ariovistus, they didn't doubt that he would put them all to death'

Similarly in the protasis ('if' clause) of a conditional sentence in indirect speech, a present subjunctive can represent an original future indicative:

nisī dēcēdat atque exercitum dēdūcat, sēsē illum prō hoste habitūrum (Caesar)
'(Ariovistus told Caesar that) if he did not retreat and withdraw his army, he would treat him as an enemy'

In other examples in reported speech, the subjunctive in the 'if' clause represents an original present subjunctive with potential meaning:

voluptātem, sī ipsa prō sē loquātur, concessūram arbitror dignitātī (Cicero)
'I believe that Pleasure, if she were to speak for herself, would give way to Dignity'

==== Other uses ====
In Latin a clause of fearing is constructed like a negative wish ("may it not happen!"). For this reason fears usually start with the negative particle nē. If the speaker fears that something may not happen, the two negatives nē and nōn can be combined:

timeō nē nōn impetrem (Cicero)
'I am afraid that I may not be granted my wish'

The present subjunctive is also used in purpose clauses with ut such as the following:

oportet ēsse ut vīvās, nōn vīvere ut edās (Rhētorica ad Herennium)
'you should eat so that you can live, not live so that you can eat'

The present subjunctive may also be used in consecutive clauses following a present tense verb:

ā dūcendā autem uxōre sīc abhorret ut līberō lectulō neget esse quicquam iūcundius (Cicero)
'he finds the idea of marrying so abhorrent that he denies there is anything more pleasant than a single bed'

After the word forsitan 'perhaps' and occasionally after fortasse 'perhaps', the present subjunctive can mean 'may' or 'could', expressing a possibility. The first example below uses the present subjunctive, and the second the perfect:

dūrum hoc fortasse videātur (Cicero)
'this may perhaps seem harsh'

A relative clause which is indefinite uses the subjunctive mood in Latin. This is known as a generic relative clause:

at etiam sunt quī dīcant, Quirītes, ā mē ēiectum in exilium esse Catilīnam (Cicero)
'but there are also some who are saying, Roman citizens, that it was by me that Catiline was sent into exile'

The subjunctive mood is also used in clauses which have a causal meaning ('in view of the fact that'), such as after causal cum. Any tense can be used including the present:

quae cum ita sint (Cicero)
'since these things are so'

=== Imperfect ===
Formation

The imperfect subjunctive, even in passive and deponent verbs, looks like an active infinitive with an ending:

- 1st conjugation: amārem (-em, -ēs, -et, -ēmus, -ētis, -ent)
- 2nd conjugation: vidērem
- 3rd conjugation: dūcerem, caperem
- 4th conjugation: audīrem

Irregular verbs:

- dō 'I give': darem (with short -a-)
- ferō 'I bear': ferrem
- eō 'I go': īrem
- volō 'I want: vellem
- nōlō 'I am unwilling': nōllem
- mālō 'I prefer': māllem
- sum 'I am': essem
- possum 'I am able': possem
- fīō 'I become / am made': fierem

Passive and deponent verbs:

- 1st conjugation passive: amārer (-er, -ēris/-ēre, -ētur, -ēmur, -ēminī, -entur)
- 2nd conjugation passive: vidērer
- 3rd conjugation passive: dūcerer, caperer
- 4th conjugation passive: audīrer

Usage

The imperfect subjunctive is used in situations similar to the present subjunctive above, but in a past-time context.

The imperfect and pluperfect subjunctives can describe something which should have been done in the past, but which it is now too late for:

at tū dictīs, Albāne, manērēs! (Virgil)
'you should have remained true to your words, o Alban!'

morerētur, inquiēs (Cicero)
'he should have died, you will say'

quid facerem? (Virgil)
'what was I to do?'

This usage is quite common in Plautus but rare in later Latin. The normal prose practice is to use either a past tense of dēbeō 'I have a duty to' or oportet 'it is proper' with the infinitive, or else a gerundive with a past tense of sum.

The imperfect subjunctive can also be used to represent an imagined or wished for situation in present time:

utinam Servius Sulpicius vīveret! (Cicero)
'if only Servius Sulpicius were alive (now)!'

In a conditional clause representing an unreal situation in present time, the imperfect subjunctive is used in both clauses:

scrīberem ad tē dē hōc plūra, sī Rōmae essēs (Cicero)
'I would write more about this to you, if you were in Rome'

Sicilia tōta, sī ūnā vōce loquerētur, hoc dīceret (Cicero)
'if the whole of Sicily were speaking with one voice, she would say this'

sī intus esset, ēvocārem (Plautus)
'if he were inside, I would call him out'

Sometimes, however, an imperfect subjunctive refers to an unreal situation in the past rather than the present:

hic sī mentis esset suae, ausus esset ēdūcere exercitum? (Cicero)
'if this man had been in his right mind (at that time), would he have dared to lead out an army?'

The 2nd person imperfect subjunctive when potential is nearly always indefinite and generalising, i.e. an imaginary 'you':

crēderēs victōs (Livy)
'you would have believed them beaten'

In a conditional clause of comparison, the imperfect subjunctive indicates an imagined situation not at the present time but contemporary with the main verb:

tantus metus patrēs cēpit velut sī iam ad portās hostis esset (Livy)
'fear overcame the senators as great as if the enemy were already at the gates'

For other examples of this see Latin conditional clauses#Conditional clauses of comparison.

In indirect questions in a historic context, an imperfect subjunctive usually represents the transformation of a present indicative. In the examples below the imperfect subjunctive represents a situation which is contemporary with the main verb:

quaesīvit salvusne esset clipeus (Cicero)
'Epaminondas asked whether his shield was safe'

nec dubitavēre Persae, quīn Issō relictā Macedones fugerent (Curtius)
'nor did the Persians doubt that, now that Issus had been abandoned, the Macedonians were fleeing'

In other sentences, however, the imperfect subjunctive is prospective; that is, it represents an action which is future relative to the main verb: (In indirect sentences of this kind there is in fact no difference between the vivid future and the ideal future conditional.)

nec, sī illa restituerētur, dubitāvī quīn mē sēcum redūceret (Cicero)
'and I didn't doubt that, if the republican government were restored, it would bring me back with it'

quiētūrus haud dubiē, nisī ultrō Etrūscī arma inferrent (Livy)
'with the intention of remaining inactive no doubt, unless (at some future time) the Etruscans were to attack of their own accord'

The imperfect subjunctive is also used for indirect commands, clauses of fearing or indirect questions after a main verb in the past tense:

imperāvit eī ut omnēs forēs aedificiī circumīret (Nepos)
'he gave him an order that he should go round all the doors of the building'

Lacedaemoniī lēgātōs Athēnās mīsērunt, quī eum absentem accusārent (Nepos)
'the Spartans sent ambassadors to Athens in order to accuse him in his absence'

verēns nē dēderētur, Crētam vēnit (Nepos)
'fearing that he might be handed over to the Romans, he came to Crete'

metuēns nē sī cōnsulum iniussū īret, forte dēprehēnsus ā custōdibus Rōmānīs retraherētur, senātum adit (Livy)
'fearing that if he were to go without the permission of the consuls, he might be caught and dragged back by the Roman guards, he approached the senate'

It can also have a prospective or future meaning in a relative clause:

ante lūcem vōta ea quae numquam solveret nūncupāvit (Cicero)
'before dawn he announced those vows which he was never to fulfil'

After verbs meaning 'it happened that...', the imperfect subjunctive is always used even of a simple perfective action, which, if the grammatical construction did not require a subjunctive, would be expressed by a perfect indicative:

accidit ut ūnā nocte omnēs Hermae dēicerentur praeter ūnum (Nepos)
'it happened that in a single night all the statues of Hermes were thrown down except one'

Following cum 'when, while', however, the imperfect subjunctive has the meaning of an imperfect indicative. This is very common:

cum sedērem, inquit, domī trīstis, accurrit Venerius (Cicero)
'while I was sitting at home in a sad mood,' he said, 'Venerius came running up'

cum per lītora lentīs passibus, ut soleō, summā spatiārer harēnā, vīdit et incaluit pelagī deus (Ovid)
'when I was strolling with slow steps along the beach, as I often do, at the top of the sand, the god of the sea saw me and fell in love'

=== Perfect ===
Formation

- 1st conjugation: amāverim (-erim, -erīs, -erit, -erīmus, -erītis, -erint)
- 2nd conjugation: vīderim, monuerim
- 3rd conjugation: dūxerim, cēperim
- 4th conjugation: audierim (rarely audiverim)
- fero: tulerim
- eō: ierim
- volō: voluerim
- sum: fuerim
- possum: potuerim

Passive and deponent verbs:

- amātus sim (amātus fuerim)
- visus sim (vīsus fuerim)
- ductus sim (ductus fuerim)
- audītus sim (audītus fuerim)

The form with sim is more common in the classical period. In some cases there is a difference in meaning between the two forms (see below).

Usage

The perfect subjunctive sometimes expresses a wish for the past, leaving open the possibility that it may have happened:

utinam vērē augurāverim (Cicero)
'may I have prophesied correctly!'

forsitan temerē fēcerim (Cicero)
'perhaps I have acted rashly'

It can also be used in a concessive meaning:

fuerit aliīs; tibī quandō esse coepit? (Cicero)
'he may have been so to others; when did begin to be so to you?'

The perfect subjunctive can also be used in a wish for the future, but this use is described as 'archaic'.

quod dī ōmen averterint! (Cicero)
'but may the gods avert this omen!'

With the negative particle nē the perfect subjunctive can express a negative command:

nē ... mortem timuerītis
'you should not fear death'

Sometimes the perfect subjunctive refers to present or future time, and means 'could'. For example, in the following idiom the perfect is usual:

nōn facile dīxerim quicquam mē vīdisse pulchrius (Cicero)
'I couldn't easily say (= I don't think) that I have ever seen anything more beautiful'

In the following sentence both 'could' and 'could have' are possible:

ad sexāgintā captōs scrīpserim, sī auctōrem Graecum sequar (Livy)
'I could have written that the number of captives was as many as sixty, if I were to follow the Greek authority'

In other examples, however, the perfect subjunctive definitely refers to the past and means 'could have done' or 'would have done':

quī ambō saltūs eum ... ad Libuōs Gallōs dēdūxerint (Livy)
'either of these passes would have brought (Hannibal) down to the Libuan Gauls'

The perfect tense may also (but rarely) sometimes be used in an ideal condition, describing an imagined hypothetical situation in the future:

Cicerōnī nēmo ducentōs nunc dederit nummōs, nisi fulserit ānulus ingēns (Juvenal)
'these days (if he were to come back to life) no one would give Cicero even two hundred coins, unless a huge ring glittered (on his finger)'

sī nunc mē suspendam, meīs inimīcīs voluptātem creāverim (Plautus)
'if I were to hang myself now, I would simply end up having given pleasure to my enemies'

In the following sentence, in which a conditional clause is used in reported speech, the perfect subjunctive is equivalent to a future perfect indicative in oratio recta:

haec sī ēnūntiāta Ariovistō sint, nōn dubitāre quīn dē omnibus supplicium sūmat (Caesar)[33]

'they said that if these things were reported to Ariovistus, they didn't doubt that he would put them all to death'

The perfect subjunctive is also found in subordinate clauses in indirect statements, usually when the main verb is in the present tense. This also applies to when the indirect speech is only implied rather than explicit, as in the following sentences:

Caesar mihī ignōscit per litterās quod nōn vēnerim (Cicero)
'Caesar is pardoning me by means of a letter for the fact that I didn't come'

mea māter īrāta est quia nōn redierim (Plautus)
'my mother is angry because I didn't return'

The perfect subjunctive usually represents what would be a perfect indicative in an independent clause. However, since there is no way of expressing an imperfect tense in primary sequence except using the perfect subjunctive, it could also sometimes represent an imperfect indicative.

ex eō facile conicī poterit, quam cārus suīs fuerit (Nepos)
'from this it will be easily conjectured how dear he was to his people'

quid lēgātī ēgerint nōndum scīmus (Cicero)
'we do not yet know what the ambassadors have done' (or 'were doing', or 'did')

steterim an sēderim nesciō (Seneca the Elder)
'I don't know whether I was standing or sitting'

Phrases of the kind nōn dubitō 'I do not doubt' are usually followed by quīn (literally 'how not') and the subjunctive, much like an indirect question:

nōn dubitō quīn occupātissimus fuerīs (Cicero)
'I have no doubt that you were very busy' (original erās or fuistī)

In consecutive (result) clauses, the sequence of tenses rule is not so strictly adhered to. For example, in the following, the perfect subjunctive vīderit is used, despite the fact that the main verb is historic:

eō ūsque sē praebēbat patientem atque impigrum ut eum nēmō umquam in equō sedentem vīderit (Cicero)
'he showed himself to be so tough and energetic that no one ever saw him sitting on a horse'

The subjunctive is also used in various types of relative clause. The following is an explanatory relative clause ('inasmuch as' or 'in view of the fact that'):

mē caecum quī haec ante nōn vīderim! (Cicero)
'I must be blind that I didn't see this before!'

The following is generic or indefinite:

nēmō Lilybaeī fuit quīn vīderit (Cicero)
'there was no one in Lilybaeum who did not see it'

The following is a restrictive relative clause:

Catōnis ōrātiōnēs, quās quidem invēnerim (Cicero)
'the speeches of Cato, at least such as I have discovered'

==== Ductus fuerim ====
The perfect subjunctive with fuerim is more common than the perfect indicative with fuī. In the Augustan-period writers Hyginus and Vitruvius nearly a third of perfect subjunctives are double ones, and in Egeria's writing (4th century AD) it completely replaced the perfect subjunctive with sim.

nocēns, nisī accūsātus fuerit, condemnārī non potest (Cicero)
'a guilty man cannot be condemned unless he has first been accused'

In the following examples, the perfect subjunctives with fuerit contrast with the ordinary perfect subjunctive tenses, and apparently refer to an earlier event:

id utrum parum ex intervallō sit cōnspectum, an dolus aliquis suspectus fuerit, incompertum est (Livy)
'whether this was noticed too late, or whether (before it was noticed) some trick was suspected, is unknown'

id utrum suā sponte fēcerint an quia mandātum ita fuerit nōn certum est (Livy)
'whether they did this of their own accord or whether it was because they already had instructions to do so is not certain'

In the following example, however, the tense may have been chosen simply for euphony rather than meaning:

hāc Trōiana tenus fuerit fortūna secūta (Virgil)
'may it turn out that Trojan ill-fortune has followed us this far, no further!'

=== Pluperfect ===
Formation

- 1st conjugation: amāssem (less often amāvissem) (-ssem, -ssēs, -sset, -ssēmus, -ssētis, -ssent)
- 2nd conjugation: vīdissem, monuissem
- 3rd conjugation: dūxissem, cēpissem
- 4th conjugation: audīssem (rarely audīvissem)

Irregular verbs:

- dō: dedissem
- ferō: tulissem
- eō: īssem
- volō: voluissem
- sum: fuissem
- possum: potuissem

Passive and deponent verbs:

- 1st conjugation: amātus essem (amātus fuissem)
- 2nd conjugation: visus essem (vīsus fuissem)
- 3rd conjugation: ductus essem (ductus fuissem)
- 4th conjugation: audītus essem (audītus fuissem)

The form with essem is more common than fuissem in the classical period. In some cases there is a difference in meaning between the two forms (see below).

Occasionally a shortened form of the pluperfect subjunctive active is found, e.g. ērēpsēmus for ērēpsissēmus. Scholars are unclear whether this is an archaic survival or whether it is merely a "syncopated" (shortened) form of the usual tense. (For examples, see below.)

==== Unreal situation or wish ====
The pluperfect subjunctive can be used to make a wish which cannot now be fulfilled about a situation in the past:

utinam ille omnīs sēcum suās cōpiās ēduxisset! (Cicero)
'if only he had led out all his forces with him!'

Sometimes velim or vellem 'I would that' is used instead of utinam. In the following sentence, the imperfect subjunctive vellem is used to wish for something that cannot now come true, while the present subjunctive velim leaves open the possibility that it may be true:

dē Menedēmō vellem vērum fuisset, dē rēgīnā velim vērum sit. (Cicero)
'I wish it had been true about Menedemus; I hope it may be true about the queen'

The jussive pluperfect is also fairly uncommon. The following examples are from Cicero, again using the negative nē:

nē popōscissēs (Cicero)
'you shouldn't have asked'

quid facere dēbuistī? pecūniam rettulissēs, frūmentum nē ēmissēs (Cicero)
'what should you have done? you ought to have returned the money, you ought not to have bought the corn'

In the following sentence, using the pluperfect subjunctive, according to one view, Queen Dido contemplates what 'might have been':

facēs in castra tulissem implēssemque forōs flammīs (Virgil)
'I could have carried torches into the camp and filled the gangways with flames'

Others see the pluperfect subjunctive in this sentence as a wish ('if only I had carried!'); others again as jussive ('I ought to have carried!').

The pluperfect subjunctive in conditional clauses is used for referring to unreal events in past time. This usage is found as early as Plautus:

sī appellāssēs, respondisset (Plautus)
'if you had called him, he would have replied'

It is also possible for the protasis to be imperfect subjunctive, and the apodosis pluperfect subjunctive, or the other way round, as in the following examples:

quid facerēs, sī amīcum perdidissēs? (Seneca)
'how would you react, if you had lost a friend?'

ergō egō nisī peperissem, Rōma nōn oppugnārētur; nisī fīlium habērem, lībera in līberā patriā mortua essem (Livy)
'therefore if I had not given birth, Rome would not now be being attacked; if I did not have a son, I would have died as a free woman in a free country'

==== In a temporal clause ====
Another very common use of the pluperfect subjunctive is in a circumstantial cum-clause. Here cum tends to have the meaning "after X happened", equivalent to postquam with the perfect indicative:

quod cum audīvisset, accurrisse Rōmam dīcitur (Cicero)
'when he heard this, he is said to have hurried to Rome'

==== Indirect speech ====
In indirect speech, the pluperfect subjunctive is often a transformation of a perfect indicative in direct speech. In the following example, the original direct question would have had the perfect tense (fuistī):

quaesīvī ā Catilīnā, in nocturnō conventū apud M. Laecam fuisset necne (Cicero)
'I asked Catiline whether he had been at a night-time meeting at Marcus Laeca's house or not'

In some sentences, the pluperfect subjunctive is a reflection of an original imperfect indicative, as in the following example, where the original verbs would have been mīlitābāmus and habēbāmus:

[dīxit eōs] id tantum dēprecārī, nē īnferiōrēs iīs ordinēs quam quōs cum mīlitāssent habuissent adtribuantur (Livy)
'[he said] that they begged just one favour, that they should be not assigned lower ranks than those which they had held when they were on military service'

In other sentences in indirect speech, the pluperfect subjunctive is a transformation of a future perfect indicative, put into historic sequence. The original words of the following sentence would have been tū, sī aliter fēcerīs, iniūriam Caesarī faciēs 'if you do (will have done) otherwise, you will be doing Caesar a disservice':

eum, sī aliter fēcisset, iniūriam Caesarī factūrum dīxit (Cicero)
'he said that if the man were to do otherwise, he would be doing Caesar a disservice'

in hōc discrīmine lūdōs Iovī, sī fūdisset cecīdissetque hostīs, prōpraetor vōvit (Livy)
'at this critical moment in the battle, the propraetor vowed games to Jupiter, if he routed and slaughtered the enemies'

==== Syncopated pluperfect subjunctive ====
A shortened or "syncopated" form of the pluperfect subjunctive ending in -sem instead of -sissem is sometimes found, although it is not very common. The following comes from Horace's well-known account of his journey to Brundisium:

(montēs) ... quōs nunquam ērēpsēmus, nisi nōs vīcīna Trivīcī vīlla recēpisset (Horace)
'(mountains) which we would never have crawled to the end of, had not a nearby villa in Trivicum welcomed us'

Another example comes from Plautus:

dīs hercle habeō grātiam, nam ni intellexēs, numquam, crēdo, āmitterēs! (Plautus)
'thank God you understand, for if you hadn't understood, you would never let the subject drop, I'm sure!'

In the following example, the subjunctive is used to indicate indirect speech:

postquam recessēt vīta patriō corpore, agrum sē vēndidisse (Plautus)
'he told me that as soon as the life had left his father's body, he had sold his farm'

The following from Virgil describes what might have been, or should have been:

nātumque patremque cum genere extīnxem (Virgil)
'I could have (or should have) extinguished son and father along with their family!'

R. D. Williams describes the following example as "jussive":

vīxet cui vītam deus aut sua dextra dedisset (Virgil)
'he, to whom either God or his own right hand had given life, should have lived'

==== Ductus fuissem ====
Like the pluperfect indicative with fueram, the pluperfect subjunctive with fuissem sometimes refers to an earlier time, which is now over. In the following example, Cicero contrasts the time when Marcus Claudius Marcellus captured Syracuse (3rd century BC) with the period when Gaius Verres was governor of Sicily (73–70 BC):

portum Syrācūsānōrum, quī tum et nostrīs classibus et Carthāginiēnsium clausus fuisset, eum istō praetōre Cilicum myoparōnī praedōnibusque patuisse (Cicero)
'the harbour of the Syracusans, which at that time had been closed both to our fleets and to the Carthaginians', in the period of Verres' praetorship was laid wide open to a pirate vessel of Cilicians and to robbers'

However, in the following examples, there appears to be little or no difference in meaning between the pluperfect with fuisset and that with esset, and difference is perhaps only one of style:

quās ego exspectāssem Brundisiī, sī esset licitum per nautās (Cicero)
'I would have waited for your letter at Brundisium, if it had been permitted by the sailors'

sī per tuās legiōnēs mihi licitum fuisset venīre in senātum ..., fēcissem (Cicero)
'if it had been permitted to me by your legions to come to the senate, I would have done so'

Because the feminine participle + fuisset makes a suitable ending for a hexameter, it is possible that in the following examples the double pluperfect is merely used for metrical convenience, rather than indicating an anterior time. In the first example, which is spoken by the ghost of Hector to Aeneas, encouraging him to flee from Troy, the tense with fuissent refers to an earlier time when Hector was still alive:

sī Pergama dextrā dēfendī possent, etiam hāc dēfēnsa fuissent (Virgil)
'if Troy could be defended by anyone's right hand, it would have been defended (while I was still alive) even by this one'

The following unfulfillable wish also uses the double pluperfect subjunctive passive:

vellem haud correpta fuisset mīlitiā tālī, cōnāta lacessere Teucrōs (Virgil)
'I wish she had never been seized by such love of warfare or attempted to provoke the Trojans!'

Another example comes from Ovid, referring to the time before the Trojan War started:

nisi rapta fuisset Tyndaris, Eurōpae pāx Asiaeque foret (Ovid)
'if Tyndareus' daughter had not previously been raped, there would be peace between Europe and Asia'

In the following example Ovid describes the fate of the Athenian princess Aglauros, who was turned to stone out of envy for her sister:

nec cōnāta loquī est, nec, sī cōnāta fuisset, vōcis habēbat iter (Ovid)
'she did not try to speak, nor, even if she had tried, would she have had any way of speaking'

=== Forem ===
The verb sum 'I am', as well as its infinitive esse 'to be', has a future infinitive fore, equivalent to futūrum esse. From this is formed a subjunctive forem. This is not used in Caesar, but is common in Livy, Sallust, and Nepos. It is used especially in conditional sentences, either in the protasis ('if' clause) or the apodosis (main clause), and it generally has either a potential or future-in-the past meaning. However, occasionally it seems to be simply a variation on the imperfect subjunctive essem.

One use of forem is in indirect speech after sī 'if' as the equivalent of the future indicative erit in the original direct speech:

imperat Tullus utī iuventūtem in armīs habeat: ūsūrum sē eōrum operā sī bellum cum Veientibus foret (Livy)
'Tullus ordered him to keep the young men armed; he would need their help if (at some future time) there was a war with the people of Veii'

sī summus foret, futūrum brevem (Cicero)
'(he was confident) that even if (the pain) were to be very great, it would be brief'

It can also be used with a future-in-the-past meaning in sentences like the following, which are not conditional but indirect speech:

multō sē in suō lectulō (morī) mālle, quicquid foret (Cicero)
'he said that he would far rather die in his own bed, whatever might happen in future'

idque eō dīcitur fēcisse, quō inter sē fīdī magis forent (Sallust)
'and it is said that he did this so that (in future) they would be more trustworthy to one other'

pars stāre incertī utrum prōgredī an regredī in castra tūtius foret (Livy)
'some were standing still, uncertain whether it would be safer to go forward or to retreat into the camp'

Aristotelēs respondit factūrum esse quod vellent, cum id sibī foret tempestīvum (Gellius)
'Aristotle replied that he would do what they wanted when it was a suitable time for him'

In the following sentence the imperfect is typical of letter-writing. An English writer would say 'I have no doubt that he will be...':

mihī dubium non erat quīn ille iam iamque foret in Āpūliā (Cicero)
'(at the time of writing this) I personally had no doubt that he would be in Apulia any moment now'

In other sentences, however, foret has no future meaning, but simply has the meaning of esset, as in the following example, where it appears to be used simply for metrical convenience as the equivalent of esset in the second half:

sī fraxinus esset, fulva colōre foret; sī cornus, nōdus inesset (Ovid)
'if it were made of ash-wood, it would be light in colour; if cornel-wood, there would be a knot in it'

=== Tenses with future participle ===
==== Ductūrus sim ====
Unlike in clauses following nōn dubitō quīn, in indirect questions referring to a future time the periphrastic future subjunctive is regularly used:

quid ille factūrus sit incertum est (Cicero)
'it is uncertain what he is going to do'

In indirect statements and questions, the active periphrastic future can represent a future or periphrastic future tense of direct speech in primary sequence. In this case there is not necessarily any idea of planning or intention, although there may be:

tē ubī vīsūrus sim, nesciō (Cicero)
'I don't know when I'm going to see you'

quid agātis et ecquid in Italiam ventūrī sītis hāc hieme, fac plānē sciam (Cicero)
'let me know in detail what you are doing and whether at all you'll be coming to Italy this winter'

This tense can also be used in primary sequence reported speech, to represent the main clause in either an ideal conditional sentence or a simple future one (the distinction between these two disappears in indirect speech):

quem adhūc nōs quidem vīdimus nēminem; sed philosophōrum sententiīs, quālis hic futūrus sit, sī modō aliquandō fuerit, expōnitur (Cicero)
'we ourselves have never seen such a (perfectly wise) man; but it is explained in the opinions of philosophers what such a person would be like, if one were ever to exist'

To avoid ambiguity, the periphrastic future can also be used after nōn dubitō quīn 'I don't doubt that...' when the meaning is future, although this is not as common as in indirect questions:

nōn dubitō quīn in Formiānō mānsūrus sīs (Cicero)
'I have no doubt you are planning to remain (in the villa) at Formiae'

==== Ductūrus essem ====
The same meaning is expressed in indirect questions in a past context:

exspectābant hominēs quidnam āctūrus esset (Cicero)
'people were waiting to see what exactly he was going to do'

If the main verb is in past time, an imperfect version of the periphrastic future subjunctive is used:

dubitābam tū hās ipsās litterās essēsne acceptūrus (Cicero)
'I wasn't sure whether you were going to receive this letter'

==== Ductūrus forem ====
It is also possible to form an imperfect periphrastic subjunctive with forem instead of essem (the first instance of this is in Sallust):

dīcit sē vēnisse quaesītum ab eō, pācem an bellum agitātūrus foret (Sallust)
'he said that he had come to ask him whether he was intending to make peace or war'

Ptolomaeum iussit ... Indōs clāmōre terrēre, quasi flūmen transnātūrus foret (Curtius)
'he ordered Ptolemy to terrify the Indians with shouting, as if he was about to swim across the river'

==== Ductūrus fuerim ====
A perfect periphrastic subjunctive can be used with a conditional meaning ('would have done') in hypothetical conditional clauses in indirect questions in primary sequence. In this case it represents a pluperfect subjunctive in the original direct speech:

dīc agedum, Appī Claudī, quidnam factūrus fuerīs, sī eō tempore cēnsor fuissēs? (Livy)
'tell us, Appius Claudius, what you would have done, if you had been censor at that time?'

an potest quisquam dubitāre quīn, sī Q. Ligārius in Italiā esse potuisset, in eādem sententiā futūrus fuerit in quā frātrēs fuērunt? (Cicero)
'can anyone doubt that if Quintus Ligarius had been able to be in Italy, he would have been of the same opinion as his brothers were?'

In an indirect question, the perfect periphrastic subjunctive can also sometimes reflect a potential imperfect subjunctive:

cōgitā quantum additūrus celeritātī fuerīs, sī ā tergō hostis īnstāret (Seneca)
'imagine how much speed you would be putting on, if an enemy were threatening you from behind!'

These tenses can be compared with the similar examples with the perfect periphrastic infinitive cited below, where a conditional sentence made in imperfect subjunctives is converted to an indirect statement.

==== Ductūrus fuissem ====
The pluperfect version of the periphrastic subjunctive can be used in a circumstantial cum clause:

cum dē rē pūblicā relātūrus fuisset, adlātō nūntiō dē legiōne quārtā mente concidit (Cicero)
'when Antony had been about to bring some motion about the republic, a message suddenly arrived about the 4th legion and he lost his composure'

It can also be used in conditional sentences after sī, as in the following sentence from an imaginary letter from Helen to Paris:

hīs ego blanditiīs, sī peccātūra fuissem, flecterer (Ovid)
'by flatteries such as these, if I had been going to sin, I might have been persuaded'

Once in Cicero it occurs in the apodosis of an unreal conditional, referring to the inevitability of fate:

etiamsī obtemperāsset auspiciīs, idem ēventūrum fuisset; mūtārī enim fāta non possunt (Cicero)
'even if he had obeyed the auspices, the same thing would have been destined to happen; for the fates cannot be changed'

It can also reflect a potential pluperfect subjunctive ('would have done') in historic sequence in an indirect question:

subībat cōgitātiō animum quōnam modō tolerābilis futūra Etrūria fuisset, sī quid in Samniō adversī ēvēnisset (Livy)
'it occurred to them how impossible Etruria would have been, if anything had gone wrong in Samnium'

==== Ductus forem ====
In some authors, such as Livy and Sallust, a potential meaning can be given to the pluperfect subjunctive passive by substituting foret for esset:

dēlētusque exercitus foret nī fugientēs silvae texissent (Livy)
'and the army would have been annihilated if the woods hadn't provided cover for those who were fleeing'

obsessaque urbs foret, nī Horātius cōnsul esset revocātus (Livy)
'and the city would have been besieged, if the consul Horatius had not been recalled'

quod nī Catilīna mātūrāsset prō cūriā signum sociīs dare, eō diē post conditam urbem Rōmam pessumum facinus patrātum foret (Sallust)
'but if Catiline had not been late in giving his allies a sign in front of the senate, on that day the worst crime in the history of Rome would have been committed'

In other authors, however, the same meaning is expressed using the ordinary pluperfect passive:

quod nisi nox proelium dirēmisset, tōtā classe hostium Caesar potītus esset ([Caesar])
'but if night hadn't interrupted the battle, Caesar would have gained control of the whole enemy fleet'

When used in indirect speech, sometimes this tense is the equivalent of a future perfect passive in the original speech:

cōnsulātum petēbat spērāns, sī dēsignātus foret, facile sē ex voluntāte Antōniō ūsūrum (Sallust)
'he was seeking the consulship, hoping that if he should be elected he would easily manage Antony according to his pleasure'

timor inde patrēs incessit nē, sī dīmissus exercitus foret, rūrsus coetūs occultī coniūrātiōnēsque fīerent (Livy)
'the senators began to be afraid that if the army were dismissed, there would be further secret meetings and conspiracies'

nē, sī ab hostibus eae captae forent, cōnsilia sua nōscerentur, epistulās id genus factās mittēbant (Gellius)
'for fear that, if those letters were to be captured by the enemy, their plans might be known, they used to send letters made in this way'

puerum, prīmus Priamō quī foret postillā nātus, temperāret tollere (Cicero)
'the oracle told Priam that he should forbear to raise the first son who was going to be born to him subsequently'

tametsī ... vōbīs quod dictum foret scībāt factūrōs (Plautus)
'although he knew that you would do whatever was (going to be) told to you'

In each of the above sentences, foret looks to the future, relative to a point in the past. In the following sentences, however, it has a past, not future, meaning:

sī utrumvīs hōrum unquam tibi vīsus forem, nōn sīc lūdibriō tuīs factīs habitus essem (Terence)
'if I had ever seemed either of these things to you, I wouldn't have been made a mockery of by your deeds in this way'

alius alium accusantes, quod, cum potuisset, non omnis submersa aut capta classis hostium foret (Livy)
'blaming one another because, when it had been possible, not all the enemy fleet had been sunk or captured'

=== Archaic forms of the subjunctive ===
==== siem, fuam, duim ====
An archaic form of the subjunctive of sum is siem for sim, which is very common in Plautus and Terence, but fell out of use later:

scīs ubi siēt? (Terence)
'do you know where she is?'

Less common is fuam, with the same meaning. This occurs occasionally in Plautus and also once in Lucretius (4.635) and once in Virgil's Aeneid, where the archaic form is presumably appropriate for the speech of the god Jupiter:

Trōs Rutulusne fuat, nūllō discrīmine habēbō (Virgil)
'whether it be Trojan or Rutulian, I shall make no distinction!'

Another old subjunctive is duim, from the verb dō 'I give'. It occurs mostly in Plautus and Terence, but sometimes also in Cicero, in phrases like the following:

dī tē perduint! (Plautus)
'may the gods destroy you!'

From tangō, attingō 'I touch' comes a subjunctive attigās used by both Plautus and Terence:

ne attigās mē! (Plautus)
'do not touch me!'

The idiomatic expression dumtaxat 'only, exactly, as far as concerns' is thought to preserve another archaic subjunctive of tango 'I touch'.

==== faxim, servassim, ausim ====
In old Latin, a form of the subjunctive with -s-, known as the sigmatic aorist subjunctive, is preserved (faxim, servāssim etc.). One use of this is for wishes for the future:

dī tē servāssint semper! (Plautus)
'may the gods preserve you always!'

deī faxint ut liceat! (Cicero)
'may the gods ensure that it be allowed'

id tē Iuppiter prohibessit! (Plautus)
'may Jupiter protect you from that!'

In Plautus this subjunctive is also used in prohibitions, when it exists:

nīl mē cūrāssīs! (Plautus)
'don't worry about me!'

It also occurs once in Terence:

nē mē istōc posthāc nōmine appellāssīs! (Terence)
'please don't call me by that name again!'

In other phrases it has a potential meaning and can be translated with 'would':

male faxim lubēns (Plautus)
'I would willingly do him harm!'

nec satis sciō, nec, sī sciam, dīcere ausim (Livy)
'I do not know exactly, nor, if I knew, would I dare to say'

=== Sequence of tenses rule ===
Latin speakers used subjunctive verbs to report questions, statements, and ideas. When the verb of telling or asking in the dominant clause is primary, the subjunctive verb in the dependent clause must also be primary; when the verb in the dominant clause is secondary or historic, the subjunctive verb in the dependent clause must also be in a historic tense. This rule can be illustrated with the following table:

Sequence of tenses rule
	Main verb	Dependent verb
Primary tenses	Present; Future; Future Perfect (Perfect)	Present subjunctive Perfect subjunctive
Historic tenses	Perfect; Imperfect; Pluperfect; Historic infinitive	Imperfect subjunctive Pluperfect subjunctive

This rule applies to all kinds of sentences where the dependent verb is put in the subjunctive mood, for example indirect speech, indirect questions, indirect commands, purpose clauses, most consecutive clauses, clauses after verbs of fearing, quīn clauses and others. It does not apply to more loosely connected dependent clauses, such as relative clauses, where the verb is in the indicative.

The perfect tense appears in both rows, depending on whether it has a present perfect meaning ('have done', primary) or past simple meaning ('did', historic). But even when it has a present perfect meaning it is often treated as a historic tense (see further below).

It may be noted that although the perfect indicative is usually treated as a historic tense, the perfect subjunctive is usually treated as a primary one (but see exceptions below).

Examples of primary sequence

Present indicative + present subjunctive:

quaerunt ubī sit (Cicero)
'they ask where it is'

Present subjunctive + present subjunctive:

velim vērum sit (Cicero)
'I hope it is true'

Present imperative + periphrastic perfect subjunctive:

dīc quid factūrus fuerīs? (Livy)
'tell us what you would have done'

Present indicative + Perfect subjunctive:

mīror quid causae fuerit quā rē cōnsilium mūtārīs (Cicero)
'I wonder what the reason was that you changed your plan'

Examples of historic sequence

Imperfect indicative + imperfect subjunctive:

quaerēbātur ubī esset (Cicero)
'people were asking where he was'

Imperfect subjunctive + pluperfect subjunctive:

vellem vērum fuisset (Cicero)
'I wish it had been true'

Perfect indicative + imperfect subjunctive:

senātus dēcrēvit ut statim īret (Cicero)
'the Senate decreed that he should go at once'

Historic infinitive + imperfect subjunctive:

hortārī, utī semper intentī parātīque essent (Sallust)
'he constantly urged that they be always on their guard and prepared'

Perfect tense main verb

When the main verb is a perfect tense, it is usually considered to be a historic tense, as in the above example. Occasionally, however, when the meaning is that of an English present perfect, the perfect in a main clause may be taken as a primary tense, for example:

nōndum satis cōnstituī molestiaene plūs an voluptātis attulerit Trebātius noster (Cicero)
'I haven't yet quite made my mind up whether our friend Trebatius has brought me more trouble or pleasure'

mē praemīsit domum haec ut nūntiem uxōrī suae (Plautus)
'he has sent me home ahead of him so that I can take this news to his wife'

However, the historic sequence after a perfect with present perfect meaning is also very common, for example:

extorsistī ut fatērer (Cicero)
'you have compelled me to confess'

tandem impetrāvī abīret (Plautus)
'at last I've got him to go away!'

Historic present main verb

When the main verb is a historic present, the dependent verb may be either primary or historic, but is usually primary:

nuntium mittit ... ut veniant (Livy)
'she sends a message that they should come' (both verbs primary)

lēgātōs mittunt quī pācem peterent (Livy)
'they send ambassadors (who were) to ask for peace' (second verb historic)

Sometimes both primary and historic are found in the same sentence. In the following example the first dependent verb cūrat is primary sequence, but dīxisset is pluperfect:

rogat ut cūrat quod dīxisset (Cicero)
'he asked him to pay attention to what he had said'

Exceptions

There are frequent exceptions to the sequence of tenses rule, especially outside of indirect speech. For example, in the following sentence, a historic tense is followed by a perfect subjunctive:

quis mīles fuit quī Brundisī illam non vīderit? (Cicero)
'what soldier was there who did not see her in Brundisium?'

In consecutive clauses also, a perfect tense in the main clause is often followed by a present or a perfect subjunctive:

[Siciliam Verrēs] per triennium ita vexāvit ut ea restituī in antīquum statum nōn possit (Cicero)
'Verres so harried Sicily for three years that it cannot be restored to its original state.'

In indirect conditional sentences, the periphrastic perfect subjunctive often remains even after a historic-tense main verb:

nec dubium erat quīn, sī possent, terga datūrī hostēs fuerint (Livy)
'nor was there any doubt that if they had been able, the enemies would have turned their backs'

The perfect tense potuerim also can replace a pluperfect tense with the meaning 'could have' even after a historic verb:

haud dubium fuit quīn, nisi ea mora intervēnisset, castra eō diē Pūnica capī potuerit (Livy)
'there was no doubt that, if that delay had not intervened, the Carthaginian camp could have been captured on that day'

Caesar and Sallust can sometimes use a present subjunctive in historic sequence when the meaning is jussive (although this practice is not always followed):

respondit sī quid ab senātū petere vellent, ab armīs discēdant (Sallust)
'he replied that if they wished to make any request from the Senate, they should disarm'

In general, in Livy, there is a tendency for a present or perfect tense of the original speech to be retained in historic sequence, while Cicero is more strict in following the historic sequence.

When the main verb is primary, an imperfect or pluperfect subjunctive in a clause that is already subordinate in the original sentence may often remain:

dīc quid factūrus fuerīs sī cēnsor fuissēs? (Livy)
'tell us what you would have done if you had been censor?'

In the following, a perfect subjunctive (a primary tense) is treated as if it were a perfect indicative (a historic tense), and so is followed by an imperfect subjunctive in the subordinate clause:

sed tamen, quā rē acciderit ut ex meīs superiōribus litterīs id suspicārēre nesciō (Cicero)
'but how it happened that you suspected this from my earlier letters, I don't know'

== Infinitives ==
=== Overview ===
There are two main infinitive tenses, present and perfect (e.g. dūcere 'to lead' and dūxisse 'to have led'). However, a number of further infinitives are made periphrastically to represent other shades of meaning, such as future and potential, in indirect speech.

The infinitive tenses are similar to the subjunctive tenses, except that there is no distinction between primary and historic tenses. Thus corresponding to the present and imperfect subjunctive tenses dūcam / dūcerem is the present infinitive dūcere; corresponding to the perfect and pluperfect subjunctive dūxerim / dūxissem is the perfect infinitive dūxisse; corresponding to the future ductūrus sim / ductūrus essem is the future infinitive ductūrus esse; and corresponding to the potential ductūrus fuerim / ductūrus fuissem is the perfect potential infinitive ductūrus fuisse.

=== Formation ===
- 1st conjugation: amāre, amāsse (amāvisse) 'to love; to have loved'
- 2nd conjugation: vidēre, vīdisse 'to see; to have seen'
- 3rd conjugation (-ō): dūcere, dūxisse 'to lead; to have led'
- 3rd conjugation (-iō): capere, cēpisse 'to capture; to have captured'
- 4th conjugation: audīre, audīsse (audīvisse) 'to hear; to have heard'

Irregular verbs:

- dō 'I give': dare, dedisse
- ferō 'I bear': ferre, tulisse
- eō 'I go': īre, īsse
- volō 'I want': velle, voluisse
- nōlō 'I don't want': nōlle, nōluisse
- mālō 'I prefer': mālle, māluisse
- sum 'I am': esse, fuisse
- possum 'I am able': posse, potuisse
- fīō 'I become / am made': fierī, factus esse 'to be done/to become; to have been done/to have become'

Passive and deponent verbs:

- 1st conjugation: amārī, amātus esse 'to be loved; to have been loved'
- 2nd conjugation: vidērī, vīsus esse
- 3rd conjugation (-ō): dūcī (no -r-), ductus esse
- 3rd conjugation (-iō): capī, captus esse
- 4th conjugation: audīrī, audītus esse

Examples of deponent verbs are hortārī 'to encourage', pollicērī 'to promise', sequī 'to follow', egredī 'to come out', mentīrī 'to lie (tell a lie)'

In early Latin (especially Plautus), the passive and deponent infinitive often ends in -ier: vituperārier 'to be scolded', vidērier 'to be seen', nancīscier 'to obtain', expergīscier 'to wake up' etc.

An archaic form of the perfect active infinitive, ending in -se (dīxe, dēspexe, intellexe, admisse) is sometimes found in early Latin. There are also some rare archaic future infinitives ending in -ssere, e.g. oppugnāssere, impetrāssere and others.

=== Compound infinitives ===
Compound infinitives are made using a participle or gerundive, combined with esse, fuisse or fore. Since they are common in the accusative and infinitive construction, usually the participle is in the accusative case, as in most of the examples below. Occasionally, however, the participle is found in the nominative, for example with dīcitur 'he is said' or vidētur 'he seems':

ventūrus esse dīcitur (Cicero)
'he is said to be planning to come'

The participle can also change to show gender and plurality, as in the following where factās is feminine plural:

īnsidiās factās esse cōnstat (Cicero)
'it is agreed that an ambush was made'

However, the passive future infinitive (ductum īrī) is made using the supine of the verb. The -um therefore stays constant and does not change for gender or number.

The future infinitive is used only for indirect statements.

Often the esse part of a compound infinitive is omitted when combined with a participle or gerundive:

frātrem interfectum audīvit (Seneca)
'he heard that his brother had been killed'

cōnandum sibī aliquid Pompeius exīstimāvit (Caesar)
'Pompey reckoned that it was necessary for him to attempt to attempt something'

cōnfīdo mē celeriter ad urbem ventūrum (Cicero)
'I am sure that I will come to the city soon'

=== Historic infinitive ===
The present infinitive is occasionally used in narrative as a tense in its own right. It usually describes a scene in which the same action was being done repeatedly. There are often two or more historic infinitives in succession. When the subject is expressed, it is in the nominative case (distinguishing the historic infinitive from the accusative and infinitive of reported speech).

tum spectāculum horribile in campīs patentibus: sequī, fugere, occīdī, capī (Sallust)
'then there was a ghastly spectacle on the open plains: people kept chasing, fleeing, being killed, being captured'

clāmāre ille, cum raperētur, nihil sē miserum fēcisse (Cicero)
'the poor man kept shouting, as he was being dragged away, that he had done nothing'

iste tum petere ab illīs, tum minārī, tum spem, tum metum ostendere (Cicero)
'he by turns kept begging them, then threatening, now offering hope, now fear'

=== 'Could have done' ===
The perfect tense potuī with the infinitive can often mean 'I was able to' or 'I managed to':

Scīpio P. Rupilium potuit cōnsulem efficere, frātrem eius Lūcium nōn potuit (Cicero)
'Scipio managed to make Publius Rupilius Consul, but he wasn't able to do the same for Rupilius's brother Lucius'

However, it can also mean 'I could have done (but did not)':

quī fuī et quī esse potuī iam esse nōn possum (Cicero)
'what I was and what I could have been, I can now no longer be'

Antōnī gladiōs potuit contemnere, sī sīc omnia dīxisset (Juvenal)
'(Cicero) could have despised Antony's swords (i.e. would have had no reason to fear them), if he had spoken everything in this way!'

quaeris quid potuerit amplius adsequī Plancius, sī Cn. Scīpionis fuisset fīlius (Cicero)
'you ask what more Plancius could have achieved, if he had been the son of Gnaeus Scipio'

The pluperfect subjunctive after cum also means 'could have':

Aemilius, cum ... ēdūcere in aciem potuisset, intrā vallum suōs tenuit (Livy)
'although he could have led them out into battle, Aemilius held his troops inside the wall of the camp'

=== 'Ought to have done' ===
'Ought to have done' is often expressed with a past tense of dēbeō 'I have a duty to' or oportet 'it is fitting' together with a present infinitive:

in senātum venīre illō diē nōn dēbuistī (Cicero)
'you ought not to have come to the Senate on that day'

ad mortem tē, Catilīna, dūcī iussū cōnsulis iam prīdem oportēbat (Cicero)
'you ought to have been put to death long ago by order of the Consul, Catiline!'

Sometimes, oportēbat means 'it must be the case that...':

sī multus erat in calceīs pulvis, ex itinere eum venīre oportēbat (Cicero)
'if there was a lot of dust on his shoes, he must have been coming from a journey'

Sometimes, in familiar style, oportuit can be used with the perfect infinitive passive:

(hoc) iam prīdem factum esse oportuit (Cicero)
'this ought to have been done long ago'

The indirect speech form is regularly oportuisse with the present infinitive:

domum negant oportuisse mē aedificāre (Cicero)
'they say I ought not to have built the house'

=== Indirect commands ===
Indirect commands are made with two constructions: either ut (or nē) with the present or imperfect subjunctive, or the accusative and infinitive construction, using the present infinitive. The latter construction is used especially when the main verb is iubeō 'I order' or vetō 'I forbid', but also sometimes after imperō 'I command':

signum darī iubet (Caesar)
'he ordered the signal to be given'

quis tyrannus miserōs lūgēre vetuit? (Cicero)
'what tyrant has ever forbidden unhappy people to mourn?'

=== Indirect statements ===
The infinitive is very commonly used for the reported verb in indirect statements, whether dependent on a verb like dīcō 'I say', or other verbs such as putō 'I think', cognōscō 'I find out', meminī 'I remember' and so on.

Except where the main verb is passive, such as dīcitur 'he is said' or vidētur 'he seems' and the like, the subject of the quoted sentence is usually put into the accusative case and the verb into the infinitive. Thus a simple sentence such as Caesar vēnit 'Caesar has come' changes as follows:

cognōvērunt Caesarem vēnisse ([Caesar])
'they learnt that Caesar had come'

This construction is known as the "accusative and infinitive" construction.

The rule of tense is that the present infinitive is used for any action or situation which is contemporary with the main verb, the perfect for actions or situations anterior to the main verb, and the future infinitive for actions or situations later than the main verb. An exception to this rule is the verb meminī 'I remember', which when used of personal reminiscence (e.g. 'I remember being present') is usually followed by a present infinitive.

==== Present infinitive ====
The present infinitive in indirect speech is used to express an action or situation simultaneous with the verb of speaking:

Solōn furere sē simulāvit (Cicero)
'Solon pretended that he was mad'

sēnsit in sē īrī Brūtus (Livy)
'Brutus noticed that an attack was being made on him'

The present infinitive used after meminī when describing a personal reminiscence, however, refers to the past:

meminī mē intrāre scholam eius, cum recitātūrus esset in Milōnem (Seneca the Elder)
'I remember going into his school when he was just about to recite a speech against Milo'

==== Perfect infinitive ====
In indirect statements, a perfect infinitive represents an event or a situation which occurred prior to the time of the verb of speaking. The first two examples have a verb of speaking in the present tense:

lictōrem tuum occīsum esse dīcis (Cicero)
'you say that your bodyguard was killed'

hōs librōs tum scrīpsisse dīcitur (Cicero)
'he is said to have written these books at that time'

In the following the main verb is in a past tense, so that in English the pluperfect is used when translating the infinitive:

mihī nūntiāvit M. Marcellum pugiōne percussum esse et duo vulnera accēpisse (Servius to Cicero)
he reported to me that Marcus Marcellus had been stabbed with a dagger and had received two wounds'

The infinitive fuisse can describe a situation in the past, earlier than the time of the verb of speaking:

patrem lanium fuisse ferunt (Livy)
'they say that his father was a butcher'

The perfect infinitive may also at times be translated with a continuous tense in English, representing an imperfect tense in the original speech:

dīcitur eō tempore mātrem Pausaniae vīxisse (Nepos)
'it is said that at that time the mother of Pausanias was still living'

Often the verb of speaking is omitted if it can be understood from the context:

rem atrōcem incidisse (Livy)
'a terrible thing had happened' (she said)

Archaic perfect infinitives such as dīxe 'to have said', dēspexe 'to have looked down', intellexe 'to have understood' and others are found in Plautus: These in classical Latin would be dīxisse, dēspexisse and intellexisse:

ain tū tibi dīxe Syncerastum, Milphio, eās ésse ingenuās ambās? (Plautus)
'are you saying, Milphio, that Syncerastus told you that both those girls were free-born?'

mē dēspexe ad tē per impluvium tuom fateōr (Plautus)
'I confess I did look down at you through the hole in your roof'

==== Perfect passive with fuisse ====
Occasionally a perfect passive infinitive is found formed with fuisse instead of esse. The meaning of the two forms is different. The perfect infinitive with esse merely refers to an event which took place before the time of the verb of speaking (e.g. ('he reported that Marcellus had been killed'). Thus there are two times involved, the time of the verb of speaking and the time of the event referred to. But when the perfect infinitive has fuisse there are three times involved: the time of the verb of the speaking, the reference time, and a time earlier still when the event took place.

Just as a perfect tense can describe a current situation (e.g. 'he has died' = 'he is dead'), so a double perfect infinitive often describes a situation that existed at the time referred to, as in the following examples:

quod iūdicium cum agerētur, exercitum in forō collocātum ā Gn. Pompeiō fuisse ...ex ōrātiōne appāret (Asconius)
'it appears from the speech that while the trial was in progress, an army had been stationed in the forum by Gnaeus Pompeius'

tūn mēd indūtum fuisse pallam praedicās? (Plautus)
'are you saying that (at the time when you saw me) I was wearing (lit. was dressed in) a lady's mantle?'

Herculēs ... dēvēnit ad Promēthea, quem in Caucasō monte vīnctum fuisse suprā dīximus (Hyginus)
'Hercules eventually came to Prometheus, who, as we said above, had (earlier) been chained up / was at that time chained up in the Caucasus mountain'

dēprehēnsus dēnique cum ferrō ad senātum is quem ad Cn. Pompeium interimendum conlocātum fuisse cōnstābat (Cicero)
'finally a man who, it was established, had been stationed there to kill Gnaeus Pompeius was arrested with a weapon near the Senate'

satis est ... docēre magnam eī spem in Milōnis morte prōpositam ... fuisse (Cicero)
'it is sufficient to show that (at the time he was killed) for Clodius great hope had been placed in Milo's death'

In other examples, the double perfect infinitive describes a situation which existed earlier on, but which later changed:

cognōvī tibi eum falsō suspectum fuisse (Cicero)
'I found out that (until you got to know him better) he had previously been unfairly suspected by you'

Zanclē quoque iūncta fuisse dīcitur Ītaliae, dōnec cōnfīnia pontus abstulit (Ovid)
'Zancle (= Messina in Sicily) too is said to have been formerly joined to Italy, until the sea took away the common boundary'

populum Tanaquil adloquitur: ... sōpītum fuisse rēgem subitō ictū; ... iam ad sē redīsse (Livy)
'Tanaquil addressed the people: she said that the king had (earlier) been knocked unconscious by the sudden blow, but he had now recovered'

idque ... eius imperātōris nōmine positum ac dēdicātum fuisse (Cicero)
'and (they are saying) that (the statue) had originally been placed there and dedicated in the name of that general (but later Gaius Verres removed it)'

It is also possible to find this infinitive in contexts not in indirect speech. In the following example the infinitive refers to an action which took place at an earlier period before the time of the imagined harvest, which is itself in the past:

satum fuisse potest ubi nōn fuit messis (Quintilian)
'it's possible for a place to have been sown (earlier) where (later) there was no harvest'

The distinction between the two types of perfect infinitive is available only in passive verbs. When the verb is active, the simple perfect infinitive is used in a similar context:

potest coisse cum viro quae non peperit (Quintilian)
'it is possible for a woman who did not give birth to have (earlier) slept with a man'

Another example not in direct speech the following, in which Martial is describing a magnificent he-goat depicted on a cup, and suggests that Phrixus's sister Helle might have preferred to have been riding on this rather than the ram which she fell off:

ab hōc māllet vecta fuisse soror (Martial)
'his sister might well have preferred to have been carried by this (before she died)'

There appear to be no examples of a deponent verb in this tense of the infinitive in classical Latin.

==== Future infinitive ====
The active future infinitive is formed periphrastically, using the future participle, for example ductūrus esse 'to be going to lead'. The participle often occurs in the accusative case and can change for gender and number ductūrum esse, ductūram esse, etc). One verb, sum 'I am', has a non-compound future infinitive fore, equivalent to futūrum esse.

The future infinitive is used in reported speech for events or situations which are to take place later than the verb of speaking:

cōnfīdō tē factūrum esse omnia (Cicero)
'I am sure that you will do everything'

prōmitte hoc fore (Plautus)
'promise that this will be (so)'

In a past context the future infinitive is translated with 'would' instead of 'will':

crēdidī aegrē tibī id fore (Plautus)
'I believed it would be annoying for you'

As with the perfect passive infinitive, esse is often omitted:

locum ubī esset facile inventūrōs (Nepos)
'they would easily find the place where he was (he said)'

The irregular verbs possum 'I am able' and volō 'I want' have no future infinitive. In these verbs the present infinitive is used instead:

totīus Galliae sēsē potīrī posse spērant (Caesar)
'they hope that they will be able to gain control of the whole of Gaul'

A future passive infinitive can be made using the supine of the verb combined with īrī, the passive infinitive of the verb eō 'I go'. This is comparatively rare. The ending -um does not change for gender or number:

rūmor venit datum īrī gladiātōrēs (Terence)
'a rumour came that a gladiator show was going to be given'

Another way of expressing the future in indirect statement is to use the phrase fore ut 'it would be the case that'. This can be used with an active or passive verb, and almost always with either the present or the imperfect subjunctive:

spērō fore ut contingat id nōbīs (Cicero)
'I hope that we shall have that good fortune'

respondērunt Chaldaeī fore ut imperāret mātremque occīderet (Tacitus)
'the astrologers replied that (Nero) would become Emperor, but that he would kill his mother'

omnēs id fore putābant ut miser virgīs caederētur (Cicero)
'they all thought that the poor man was going to be beaten with rods'

Sometimes futūrum esse ut or futūrum ut is used instead of fore ut:

futūrum esse, nisī prōvisum esset, ut Rōma caperētur (Cicero)
'(the voice predicted) that unless precautions were taken, Rome would be captured'

Certain archaic future infinitives ending in -āssere can be found in Plautus, for example:

sīn aliter sient animātī neque dent quae petāt, sēse igitur summā vī virīsque eōrum oppidum oppugnāssere (Plautus)
'if on the other hand they were otherwise minded and would not give what he wanted, he would attack their town with the greatest force and army'

crēdō tē facile impetrāssere (Plautus)
'I believe you will have your request granted easily'

==== Future perfect infinitive ====
To express a future perfect tense in indirect statement is possible only if the verb is passive or deponent. In the following examples, a perfect participle is combined with the future infinitive fore:

Carthāginiēsēs dēbellātum mox fore rēbantur (Livy)
'the Carthaginians thought that the war was soon going to have been brought to an end'

metum sī quī sustulisset, omnem vītae dīligentiam sublātam fore (Cicero)
'if someone were to remove fear, all carefulness of life would have been removed too'

hoc possum dīcere, mē satis adeptum fore, sī nūllum in mē perīculum redundārit (Cicero)
'I can say this, that I will have achieved enough, if no danger redounds on me'

Very rarely fore ut can be followed by a perfect or pluperfect subjunctive. In the following example, the pluperfect subjunctive represents a future perfect indicative of direct speech:

spērābam, cum hās litterās accēpissēs, fore ut ea quae superiōribus litterīs ā tē petīssēmus impetrāta essent (Cicero to Plancus)
'I hope (epistolary imperfect) that by the time you receive this letter, what I requested from you in my earlier letter will have been granted'

==== Perfect potential infinitive ====
The periphrastic perfect infinitive (or potential infinitive) is formed from the future participle with fuisse. It is used in indirect speech for representing the main verb of an unreal conditional, whether referring to a past time or present time. In the following examples the verb refers to past time, and in the original sentence would have been pluperfect subjunctive:

hoc tamen nūntiā, melius mē moritūram fuisse sī nōn in fūnere meō nūpsissem (Livy)
'but take this message to him, that I would have died better if I had not married on the day of my funeral!'

dīxit sī egō cōnsul nōn fuissem, rem pūblicam funditus peritūram fuisse (Cicero)
'he said that if I had not been consul, the republic would have been completely finished'

If the introductory verb is passive, such as vidētur 'he seems', the participle is nominative:

nōn vidētur mentītūrus fuisse, nisī dēspērāsset (Quintilian)
'it is unlikely that he would have told a lie unless he had been desperate'

The same tense of the infinitive can also represent the transformation into indirect statement of an imperfect potential subjunctive, referring to a hypothetical present situation:

an tū cēnsēs ūllam anum tam dēlīram futūram fuisse ut somniīs crēderet, nisī ista cāsū nōn nunquam forte temerē concurrerent? (Cicero)
'do you think any old woman would ever be so crazy as to believe in dreams if they didn't come true by chance sometimes?'

quid putāmus passūrum fuisse sī vīveret? – nobīscum cēnāret! (Pliny)
'what do we think would be happening to him if he were alive?' – 'he would be dining with us!'

fatentur sē virtūtis causā, nisi ea voluptātem faceret, nē manum quidem versūrōs fuisse (Cicero)
'they confess that they would not lift a finger for the sake of virtue, unless virtue itself gave pleasure'

In such sentences the imperfect subjunctive in the subordinate clause (in this case faceret) is left unchanged, despite the fact that the main verb is primary.

Just as fore ut is used to make a future passive infinitive, so futūrum fuisse ut with the imperfect subjunctive can be used to make a potential passive infinitive:

nisi eō ipsō tempore quīdam nūntiī dē Caesaris victōriā essent allātī, exīstimābant plērīque futūrum fuisse utī āmitterētur (Caesar)
'if at that very moment certain reports had not arrived bringing news of Caesar's victory, most people reckoned that (the town) would have been lost'

However this is very rare, and in fact only two instances have been noted (the other being Cicero, Tusc. 3.69).

==== Gerundive infinitives ====
Gerundive infinitives can be formed with esse, fuisse and fore.

The present gerundive infinitive with esse is used in indirect speech to indicate something which needs to be done at the time of the verb of speaking:

medicō ipsī putō aliquid dandum esse (Cicero)
'I think something should be given to the doctor himself'

The ending of the gerundive varies according to gender and number. In the following it is feminine singular:

dīcit in nōmine Valeri in cāsū vocandī prīmam syllabam acuendam esse (Gellius)
'he says that in the name "Valerius" in the vocative case, the first syllable should be accented'

The order of the words can be reversed:

nōn opīnor esse dubitandum (Cicero)
'I do not think there is any need to doubt'

The perfect gerundive infinitive with fuisse indicates something that was necessary at a previous time:

iter Asiāticum tuum putō tibī suscipiendum fuisse (Cicero)
'I imagine that it was unavoidable for you to undertake that journey to Asia'

However, it can also refer to what ought to have been done at some time in the past:

quid tandem praetōrī faciendum fuisse? (Livy)
'what, pray, ought a praetor to have done?'

In a conditional clause in reported speech the perfect gerundive infinitive can also refer to something that would have been necessary in some hypothetical situation:

nec cuīquam ante pereundum fuisse sī Sīlius rērum poterētur (Tacitus)
'and (he said that) there wouldn't be anyone who would have to die sooner than himself if Silius were Emperor'

The future gerundive infinitive is made with fore. It is used in indirect statements to describe something which it is going to be necessary to do:

itaque eō ipsō locō mētārī suōs castra iusserat, laetus in illīs potissimum angustiīs dēcernendum fore (Curtius)
'and so he had ordered his men to lay out their camp in that very place, delighted that it was going to be necessary to fight the decisive battle in that particular narrow plain' (see Battle of Issus)

It can also describe what must inevitably happen at a future time:

senēscendum fore tantum terrārum vel sine proeliō obeuntī (Curtius)
'(he had written that) a person would inevitably grow old just visiting such a huge country, even without fighting a battle'

==== Perfect infinitive with habēre/habuisse ====
Infinitives formed with habēre and habuisse are also possible, again with stress on the maintenance of the result. These are used in indirect speech:

sē ita triennium illud praetūrae Siciliēnsis distribūtum habēre, ut ... (Cicero)
'(Verres is said to have claimed that) he had divided up that three-year period of his Sicilian praetorship in such a way that...'

tē ... fatēris ... aurum occultum habuisse (Quintilian)
'you confess that you had hidden the gold / were keeping it hidden'

pollicērer tibī ... mē sēgregātum habuisse, uxōrem ut dūxit, ā mē Pamphilum (Terence)
'I would promise you that, as soon as he got married, I split up with Pamphilus and was keeping him away from me'

Cauniī praetereā dēbent, sed aiunt sē dēpositam pecūniam habuisse (Cicero)
'the people of Caunus also owe him money, but they say that they had already deposited a sum of money'

== Imperative ==
The imperative mood has two tenses, present and future.

=== Present ===
==== Positive commands ====
The present imperative mood is the normal tense used for giving direct orders which the speaker wishes to be carried out at once. The active form can be made plural by adding -te:

dā mī bāsia mīlle, deinde centum! (Catullus)
'give me a thousand kisses, then a hundred!'

date dexterās fidemque! (Livy)
'give me your right hands and your oath!'

Deponent verbs such as proficīscor 'I set out' or sequor 'I follow' have an imperative ending in -re or -minī (plural):

patent portae: proficīscere! (Cicero)
'the gates are open: depart!'

sequiminī mē hūc intrō ambae (Terence)
'follow me this way inside, both of you'

==== Negative commands ====
An imperative is usually made negative by using nōlī(te) (literally, 'be unwilling!') plus the infinitive:

nōlīte mīrārī (Seneca the Elder)
'don't be surprised'

However, in poetry an imperative can sometimes be made negative with the particle nē:

nē mē terrēte timentem, obscēnae volucrēs! (Virgil)
'do not terrify me, who am already scared, obscene birds!'

A negative order can also use the perfect subjunctive:

dē mē nihil timuerīs (Cicero)
'do not be afraid on my account'

In later Latin, nē plus the present subjunctive became more common, for example in the Vulgate Bible. In the following example the first three verbs use the present subjunctive, and the fourth the perfect subjunctive:

nē adulterēs, nē occīdās, nē fūrēris, nē falsum testimōnium dīxerīs (Mark, 10.19)
'do not commit adultery, do not kill, do not steal, do not speak false testimony'

=== Future ===
Latin also has a Future imperative or 2nd imperative, ending in -tō(te), used to request someone to do something at a future time, or if something else happens first. This imperative is very common in early writers such as Plautus and Cato, but it is also found in later writers such as Cicero and Martial:

crās petitō, dabitur (Plautus)
'ask tomorrow; it will be given to you'

ubi nōs lāverimus, sī volēs, lavātō (Terence)
'when we have finished washing, get washed if you wish'

crūdam si edēs, in acētum intinguitō (Cato)
'if you are (going to be) eating it (cabbage) raw, dip it in vinegar'

sī quid acciderit, ... scrībitō (Cicero)
'if anything happens, write to me'

rīdētō multum quī tē, Sextille, cinaedum dīxerit et digitum porrigitō medium (Martial)
'Sextillus, laugh a lot at anyone who calls you a 'faggot' and show them the middle finger'

Some verbs have only the second imperative, for example scītō 'know', mementō 'remember'. In this case the imperative sometimes has a present rather than future meaning:

fīliolō me auctum scītō, salvā Terentiā (Cicero)
'know that I have been blessed with a little son, and that Terentia is safe'

in Britanniā ... cavētō et ... illud semper mementō (Cicero)
'when you're in Britain, take care ... and always remember this...'

There is also a future passive imperative, but it is extremely rare. It can be either 2nd or 3rd person:

pār parī iugātor coniūx (Ausonius)
'A spouse should be joined equal to equal' (or: 'Be joined as a spouse equal to an equal')

=== 3rd person formal imperative ===
Related to the colloquial future imperative is the formal imperative (usually used in the 3rd person) of legal language, as in this invented law from Cicero's de Lēgibus:

rēgiō imperiō duo suntō, iīque ... ā cōnsulendō cōnsulēs appellāminō; nēminī pārentō; ollīs salūs populī suprēma lēx estō (Cicero)
'there shall be two men with royal power; and from consulting they are to be called 'consuls'; they are to obey nobody; for them the welfare of the people shall be the supreme law'

According to J.G.F. Powell, appellāminō is not a genuine archaic form; in early Latin -minō is used only in deponent verbs and is 2nd or 3rd person singular.

== Participles ==
Compared to Greek, Latin is deficient in participles, having only three, as follows, as well as the gerundive. The Romans themselves considered the gerundive also to be a participle, but most modern grammars treat it as a separate part of speech.

The different participles of the verb dūcō are shown below:

Participles and gerundive (3rd conjugation)
	Active		Passive	
Present	dūcēns, pl. dūcentēs	leading		
Perfect			ductus, pl. ductī	led, having been led
Future	ductūrus, pl. ductūrī	going to lead		
Gerundive			dūcendus, pl. dūcendī	needing to be led
Present	sequēns, pl. sequentēs	following		
Perfect	secūtus, pl. secūtī	having followed		
Future	secūtūrus, pl. secūtūrī	going to follow		
Gerundive			sequendus, pl. sequendī	needing to be followed

The participles are all verbal adjectives, and so the ending changes according to case, gender, and number.

As the table shows, there is no passive present or future participle, and no active past participle. In deponent verbs, however, the Perfect participle is active in meaning, e.g. profectus, 'having set out', cōnātus 'having tried'. In deponent verbs, the gerundive is usually used in impersonal form and with an active meaning: proficīscendum est 'it is necessary to set out', moriendum est 'it is necessary to die', cōnandum est 'it is necessary to try'; but some deponent verbs have a personal gerundive with a passive sense: hortandus 'needing to be encouraged', sequendus 'needing to be followed':

media ratiō sequenda est (Columella)
'a middle course must be followed'

The present and future participles of deponent verbs are active in form, e.g. moriēns 'dying', moritūrus 'about to die'. Originally deponent verbs had no present participle and perfect participles such as ratus 'thinking' and veritus 'fearing' were used with a present meaning.

The verb sum 'I am' has no Present or Perfect participle in classical Latin, but only the Future participle futūrus 'going to be'. The compound verbs praesum and absum, however, form the Present participles praesēns, absēns.

The verbs volō 'I want' and possum 'I am able' have no future participle. Potēns, the present participle of possum, has a limited use as an adjective meaning 'powerful'.

The 3rd and 4th conjugation gerundive in older texts such as Plautus ends with -undus: faciundum, ferundum, veniundum. Such endings are sometimes found even in classical Latin. Later, -endus became usual, but in the verb eō 'I go', the gerundive is always eundum 'necessary to go'.

Like the infinitive, the tenses of the participles are not absolute but relative to the main verb of the sentence. For example, a future participle can refer to an action in the past, provided it is later than the time of the main verb; and similarly the perfect participle can refer to an action in the future, provided it is earlier than the time of the main verb.

=== Present ===
The present participle usually describes a condition or an action which is happening at the time of the main verb:

aquā ferventī ... perfunditur (Cicero)
'he was doused with boiling water'

strictō gladiō ad dormientem Lūcrētiam vēnit (Livy)
'having drawn his sword, he came to Lucretia while she was sleeping'

Occasionally, a present participle can refer to an action which takes place immediately before the time of the main verb:

quaerentīque virō 'satin salvē?' 'minimē' inquit (Livy)
'and to her husband, when he asked "are you all right?" she replied "not at all!" '

Present participles of deponent verbs are only very rarely found in early Latin (although Plautus is said to have written a play called Commorientēs 'Those dying together') but they became common later.

=== Perfect ===
The perfect participle refers to an action which took place before the time of the main verb, or to the state that something is in as a result of an earlier action:

occīsōs sepelīvit (Eutropius)
'he buried the dead (those who had been killed)'

A deponent participle such as ratus 'thinking, reckoning' or veritus 'fearing' can often be translated as if it were present:

idōneum tempus ratus studiīs obsequendī suīs Athēnās sē contulit (Nepos)
'thinking this a suitable time for pursuing his studies, he went to Athens'

=== Future ===
The future participle is most commonly used in the periphrastic tenses or in indirect statements (see examples above). 'An examination of the usage of the various authors shows that the form in -ūrus did not reach the full status of a participle till the time of Livy. Up to the time of Caesar and Cicero its use was almost restricted to a combination with the verb esse, making a periphrastic future tense (Woodcock). Woodcock speculates that the -ūrus ending might originally have been a verbal noun.

In later authors the future participle is sometimes used as in Greek to indicate purpose:

dēdūcit quadrirēmēs, lātūrus auxilium (Pliny)
'he launched some warships, with a view to bringing help'

== Bibliography ==
- Aerts, Simon (2018). "Tense, Aspect and Aktionsart in Classical Latin: Towards a New Approach". Symbolae Osloenses 92(1):107–149.
- Andrewes, M. (1937). "Caesar's Use of Tense Sequence in Indirect Speech". The Classical Review, Vol. 51, No. 4 (Sep., 1937), pp. 114–116.
- Andrewes, M. (1951). "The Function of Tense Variation in the Subjunctive Mood of Oratio Obliqua". The Classical Review, New Series, Vol. 1, No. 3/4 (Dec., 1951), pp. 142–146.
- De Melo, Wolfgang (2007). "Latin prohibitions and the Origins of the u/w-Perfect and the Type amāstī". Glotta, Bd. 83 (2007), pp. 43–68.
- De Melo, Wolfgang (2012). "Kuryłowicz's first 'law of analogy' and the development of passive periphrases in Latin". In Philomen Probert & Andreas Willi, Laws and Rules in Indo-European. Oxford, chapter 6, pp. 83–101.
- Ernout, Alfred; Thomas, François (1953). Syntaxe Latine (2nd edition). Paris, Klincksieck.
- Gildersleeve, B. L. & Gonzalez Lodge (1895). Gildersleeve's Latin Grammar. 3rd Edition. (Macmillan)
- Goodrich, W. J. "On the Prospective Use of the Latin Imperfect Subjunctive in Relative Clauses". The Classical Review, Vol. 31, No. 3/4 (May - Jun., 1917), pp. 83–86.
- Greenough, J. B. et al. (1903). Allen and Greenough's New Latin Grammar for Schools and Colleges. Boston and London.
- Haverling, Gerd V.M. (2002). "On the semantic functions of the Latin perfect". Amsterdam Studies in Classical Philology, Volume 10.
- Haverling, Gerd V.M. (2012). "Actionality, tense, and viewpoint". In Baldi, Philip; Cuzzolin, Pierluigi (eds.) (2012). Constituent Syntax: Adverbial Phrases, Adverbs, Mood, Tense. ISBN 978-3110205633, pp. 277–524.
- Kennedy, Benjamin Hall (1871). The Revised Latin Primer. Edited and further revised by Sir James Mountford, Longman 1930; reprinted 1962.
- Ker, James (2007). "Roman Repraesentatio". The American Journal of Philology, Vol. 128, No. 3 (Autumn, 2007), pp. 341–365.
- Madvig, J. N. (1842). Discrimen formarum amatus sum et amatus fui. In Opuscula Academica, vol. 2. pp. 218–226.
- Pinkster, Harm (1987). "The Strategy and Chronology of the Development of Future and Perfect Tense Auxiliaries in Latin". In Martin Harris and Paolo Ramat (eds.) Historical Development of Auxiliaries (Trends in Linguistics. Studies and Monographs, 35). De Gruyter Mouton.
- Pinkster, Harm (1990), Latin Syntax and Semantics. Chapter 11: The Latin tense system.
- Postgate, J. P. (1905). "Repraesentatio Temporum in the Oratio Obliqua of Caesar". The Classical Review, Vol. 19, No. 9 (Dec., 1905), pp. 441–446.
- Powell, J. G. F. (2005). "Cicero's adaptation of legal Latin in the de Legibus". In Reinhardt, T. et al. (eds). Aspects of the Language of Latin Prose. ISBN 9780197263327
- Salmon, E. T. (1931). "A Note on Subordinate Clauses in Oratio Obliqua". The Classical Review, Vol. 45, No. 5 (Nov., 1931), p. 173.
- Terrell, Glanville (1904). "The Apodosis of the Unreal Condition in Oratio Obliqua in Latin". The American Journal of Philology, Vol. 25, No. 1 (1904), pp. 59–73.
- Schlicher, J. J. (1931). "The Historical Tenses and Their Functions in Latin". Classical Philology Vol. 26, No. 1 (Jan., 1931), pp. 46–59.
- Sedgwick, W. B. (1947). "Catullus X: A Rambling Commentary". Greece & Rome Vol. 16, No. 48, pp. 108–114.
- Viti, Carlotta (2010). "The non-literal use of tenses in Latin, with particular reference to the praesens historicum". Revue de linguistique latine du Centre Alfred Ernout. (Posted at Zurich Open Repository and Archive, University of Zurich).
- Wheeler, Arthur Leslie, (1903). "The Imperfect Indicative in Early Latin". The American Journal of Philology, Vol. 24, No. 2 (1903), pp. 163–191.
- Wigtil, David N. (1992) "Translating Latin Tenses into English". The Classical World, Vol. 85, No. 6 (Jul. - Aug., 1992), pp. 675–686.
- Woodcock, E.C. (1959), A New Latin Syntax.
