= Deponent verb =

Verb that is active in meaning but takes its form from a different voice

In linguistics, a deponent verb is a verb that is active in meaning but takes its form from a different voice, most commonly the middle or passive. A deponent verb has no active forms.

== Languages with deponent verbs ==
This list may not be exhaustive.

=== Ancient Greek ===
Ancient Greek has middle-voice deponents (some of which are very common) and some passive-voice deponents. An example in classical Greek is ἔρχομαι (erchomai, 'I come' or 'I go'), middle/passive in form but translated into English using the active voice.

Some 'active' performative verbs will take middle-form futures, such as how ἀκούω (akouo, 'I hear') becomes ἀκούσομαι (akousomai, 'I will hear'), rather than the regular adding of a sigma (like παύω (pauo, 'I stop') becoming παύσω (pauso, 'I will stop')). These are still translated into English as active. For these verbs, there is no future middle, but the future passive is unaffected.

Koine Greek has a few verbs which have very different meanings in the active and middle/passive forms. For example, ἁπτω (hapto) means "I set fire to", whereas its middle form ἁπτομαι (haptomai) means "I touch". Because ἁπτομαι is much more common in usage, beginners often learn this form first and are tempted to assume that it is a deponent.

In recent years, there has been a sustained challenge to the notion of deponency by scholars of ancient Greek. They argue that the "middle-preference" verbs in Greek should be translated within the middle voice, and as a consequence that our understanding of the middle voice should be shaped by these verbs. In other words the "deponent" verbs take only the middle endings because the semantic domain of these verbs communicates a middle idea.

=== Latin ===
Latin deponent verbs can belong to any conjugation. Their form (except in the present and future participle) is that of a passive verb, but the meaning is active. Usually a deponent verb has no corresponding active form, although there are a few, such as vertō 'I turn (transitive)' and vertor 'I turn (intransitive)' which have both active and deponent forms.

Examples are hortārī ('to exhort'), verērī ('to fear'), loquī ('to speak'), blandīrī ('to flatter'), and many more. The forms regularly follow those of the passive of normal verbs:

Active	Passive	Deponent
amō 'I love'	amor 'I am loved'	hortor 'I exhort'
amāvī 'I have loved'	amātus sum 'I have been loved'	hortātus sum 'I have exhorted'

Deponents have all the participles normal verbs do, although those of the perfect carry an active meaning, rather than a passive meaning as in the case of normal verbs. Some deponent verbs, such as sequī 'to follow', use the corresponding forms of other verbs to express a genuine passive meaning.

Additionally, four Latin verbs (audēre 'to dare', gaudēre 'to rejoice', solēre 'to be accustomed', and fīdere 'to trust') are called semi-deponent, because though they look passive in their perfect forms, they are semantically active in all forms.

Conversely, Latin also has some verbs that are active in form but passive in meaning. fio 'I am made/done' was used as the passive of facio 'I do/make'. In the perfect forms (perfect, pluperfect, and future perfect), this was a compound verb just like the passive voice of regular verbs (factus sum 'I have been done').

=== Old Irish ===
Old Irish has a substantial number of deponent verbs, some of them very common, such as do·muinethar 'think, suppose' and cuirethar 'put'. The -Vr ending was the regular passive or impersonal ending.

The pattern was not continued into the modern languages and all such verbforms were ultimately replaced by 'normal' forms. The -Vr ending still is the regular passive or impersonal ending in the later language, as in the eg Modern Scottish Gaelic passive/impersonal cluinnear 'one hears/is heard'. The verb cluinn 'hear(s), can/will hear' has its origin in the deponent Old Irish ro·cluinethar 'hear'.

=== Sanskrit ===
Sanskrit has active, middle and passive voices. As the passive is a secondary formation (based on a different stem with middle endings), all deponent verbs take middle-voice forms, such as सच॑ते sác-ate.

Traditional grammar distinguishes three classes of verbs: parasmaipadin (having active forms only), ātmanepadin (having middle forms only) and ubhayapadin (having both forms). Thus, ātmanepadin might be considered deponent verbs.

=== Swedish ===
Swedish has a few passive-voice deponents, although its closely related neighbour languages Danish and Norwegian mostly use active corresponding forms. Indeed, Norwegian shows the opposite trend: as in English, active verbs are sometimes used with a passive or middle sense, such as in boka solgte 1000 eksemplarer 'the book sold 1000 copies'. -s is the normal passive ending in the Scandinavian languages.

- andas 'breathe' (cf. Danish ånde and Norwegian Bokmål ånde (non-deponent))
- hoppas 'hope' (cf. Danish håbe, Norwegian Bokmål håpe (non-deponent))
- kräkas 'vomit'
- trivas 'enjoy oneself'
- minnas 'remember'
- lyckas 'succeed'
- tyckas 'appear, seem'
- kännas 'feel', as in Det känns kallt.

A handful of Swedish deponent verbs are specifically used for reciprocal or continuous meanings. These verbs typically have non-deponent counterparts.

- kramas 'hug (each other)'
- ses 'see (each other)'
- bråkas 'fight (continuously, or, with each other)'

=== Norwegian ===
Norwegian has several common deponents which use the -es passive ending in the active voice, instead of the usual -er active ending (and retains the -es in the infinitive, where most verbs end solely in -e):

- kjennes 'perceive'
- lykkes 'succeed'
- synes 'opine, think'
- trives 'thrive'

The past tense is indicated by -d- or -t-, e.g. kjentes, lyktes, syntes, trivdes.

=== Danish ===
Modern Danish has 54 unique deponent verbs which work basically like in the other Scandinavian languages; the most common ones are:

- lykkes 'succeed'
- synes 'opine'
- trives 'thrive'

Some other verbs do have an active form but also a deponent one with a different meaning or usage, e.g.:

- skændes 'argue' (in the active form, skænde 'reproach')
- slås 'fight' (in the active form, slå 'hit')
- mødes 'meet (each other)' (in the active form møde 'meet (someone)').

Finally, some verbs are passive in Danish, but would be translated with active verbs in most other languages, e.g.:

- fås (literally 'be gotten'), 'be available'

== Deponency and tense ==
Some verbs are deponent in all tenses, but other verbs are deponent only in certain tenses. For example, the Greek verb ἀναβαίνω (anabainō) 'I go up' uses active forms in the imperfect active and aorist active, but in the future active it shows the middle form ἀναβήσομαι (anabēsomai) 'I will go up'.

Latin has a few semi-deponent verbs, which have active forms in the present, future, and imperfect tenses, but are deponent in the perfect system.

== See also ==
- Defective verb
- Inchoative verb
- Reflexive verb
- Unaccusative verb
