= Latin tenses (semantics) =

Grammar of the Latin language

From a semantic perspective, a tense is a temporal circumstance in which an event takes place relative to a given point in time. (Note: ‘Tense’ is a ‘deictic’ category, by which the state of affairs expressed by the predication is located in time. – Pinkster, 1990, 11.1.2) (Note: Tense is a deictic (meta)category: it is concerned with (external) temporality, i.e. the temporal location of a state of affairs with respect to the speaker-now context (or “deictic centre”, “moment of speech/writing”, “speech time”). – Aerts, 2018, p.108) (Note: Es lo que llamamos 'tiempo': la categoría deíctica morfosintáctica que determina la situación en el tiempo del evento expresado por el verbo con respecto a un punto de referencia. (This is what we call 'tense': the deictic morphosyntactic category that determines the temporal circumstance of the event represented by the verb relative to a reference point [in time].) – Augustín Ramos Guerreira, 2021, “Tiempo y Aspecto” in José Miguel Baños Baños, “Sintaxis Latina”, Vol. I, p.479) It is absolute (primary) if it relates the represented event to the time of the speech event (Note: Absolute tense relates a state of affairs directly to the speaker-now context (e.g. the actual and historic present, the narrative perfect, the future). – Aerts, 2018, p.108) (Note: 'The state of affairs can [...] be related to the moment of writing or speaking. – Pinkster, 1990, 11.1.2) (Note: Tiempo absoluto es aquella marca por la que la formación verbal señala directamente un momento del tiempo con relación al punto de referencia. (absolute tense is the mark by which the verbal wording directly points out a temporal circumstance relative to a reference point.) – Guerreira, 2021, p.481) (Note: von der Gengenwart des Sprechenden aus gehört ein Geschehen einer der drei Zeitstufen Gegenwart, Vergangenheit, Zukunft an: selbständiger oder absoluter Tempusgebrauch. (regarding the temporal circumstance of the speaking person, the event belongs to one of three periods Present, Past and Future: standalone or absolute tense.) – Hans Rubenbauer & J.B. Hofmann, 2018, "Lateinische Grammatik", §209) and it is relative if it relates the represented event to the time of another event in the context of discourse. (Note: Relative tense is subordinate to a matrix verb phrase (participles and infinitives). – Aerts, 2018, p.108) (Note: 'or [the state of affairs can be related] to another moment known from context or situation. – Pinkster, 1990, 11.1.2) (Note: Es tiempo relativo si la formación verbal señala un momento del tiempo anterior, simultáneo o posterior a otro momento distinto al punto de referencia. (the tense is relative if the verbal phrase determines a temporal circumstance that is anterior, interior or posterior to a time other than the reference point.) – Guerreira, 2021, p.481) (Note: von der Zeit einer anderen Handlung aus gesehen ist ein Geschehen entweder gleichzeitig, vorzeitig oder nachzeitig: bezogener oder relativer Tempusgebrauch. (the event is either interior, anterior or posterior regarding another event.) – Hans Rubenbauer & J.B. Hofmann, 2018, "Lateinische Grammatik", §209) In turn, a relative tense may be “relative to absolute” (secondary) (Note: (i) It specifies time reference other than reference to the time of the speech event, i.e. ‘secondary’ tense: past, present or future relative to the primary tense. – Halliday & Matthiessen (2014), "Halliday's introduction to functional grammar", p.151) if it relates the represented event to the primary tense. (Note: Absolute-relative tense relates a state of affairs to the speaker-now context via a reference point (e.g. the pluperfect, the future perfect) (Comrie, 1985). – Aerts, 2018, p.108) (Note: En ocasiones una referencia relativa puede incorporar también valores absolutos inferidos y cumplir ambas funciones. Es lo que Comrie (1985: 64-82) denomina tiempo absoluto-relativo, existente solo, como es lógico, para señalar de doble manera tiempos anteriores o posteriores al punto de referencia. – Augustín Ramos Guerreira, 2021, “Tiempo y Aspecto” in José Miguel Baños Baños, “Sintaxis Latina”, Vol. I, p.482) Read more about possible tenses in the article on grammatical tense.

In indicative clauses, Latin has three primary tenses (Note: La división ordinaria de la temporalidad suele acoger tres deíxis básicas: el pasado, el presente y el futuro. (The primary division of time [in Latin] has as usual three basic deixes: the past, the present and the future.) - Augustín Ramos Guerreira (2021), “Tiempo y Aspecto” in José Miguel Baños Baños, “Sintaxis Latina”, Vol. I, p.479) and three series of secondary tenses. The primary tenses are the future agam ('I will do'), the present agō ('I am doing'), and the past ēgī ('I did'). The series of secondary tenses are: 1) the secondary future series āctūrus erō ('I will be about to do'), āctūrus sum ('I am about to do'), and āctūrus eram ('I was about to do'); 2) the secondary present series agam ('I will be doing'), agō ('I am doing'), and agēbam ('I was doing'); and 3) the secondary past series ēgerō ('I will have done'), ēgī ('I have done'), and ēgeram ('I had done').

This article covers only free indicative clauses for what took place, is taking place, or will take place. For bound indicative clauses, visit Latin tenses in relative clauses and Latin tenses in dependent clauses. For indications of frequency, possibility, volition and obligation, visit the article on Latin tenses with modality. For commands, see Latin tenses in commands.

== Primary tenses ==
In Latin, a process may have one of three primary tenses: future, present and past. Each primary tense is described in a separate section below.

=== Future ===
The primary future is the future relative to the time of speech. For most verbs, the future is usually construed by a "future indicative" verb as in faciam ('I will do'). In Early Latin, there was the "sigmatic future indicative" faxō (also 'I will do'). (Note: The sigmatic future has a remarkable pattern of distribution. In main clauses only the fossilized faxō occurs, while in subordinate clauses we find forms belonging to different verbs and persons. In main clauses the meaning is that of a simple future ("I shall do"), whereas in subordinate clauses the forms could be replaced by future perfects ("I shall have done"). The perfective, but non-anterior meaning in main clauses is original. The anterior meaning in subordinate clauses is the result of reanalysis. – De Melo, 2007a.)

For verbs of recalling such as meminī ('I remember'), ōdī ('I hate'), nōvī ('I know') and some verbs of states such as mortuus est ('is dead') and dīvīsum est ('is divided'), inflections and periphrases that usually construe a past-in-future as in agerō ('I will have done') have their meanings reduced to a primary future: there is meminerō ('I will remember') evolved from meminerō ('I will have memorized') and there is mortuus erit for a future state ('he will be dead'), which evolved from the past-in-future event mortuus erit ('he will have died').

Simple and compound future
Paradigm	Latin Example	English translation	Comment
"future indicative"	īnsequentī librō explicābō (Vitruvius)	'I will explain this in the next book'	will do, do in English
"sigmatic future indicative"	faxō haud inultus prandium comēderīs (Plautus)	'I will make sure you haven't eaten that lunch unpunished'	will do, do in English
"future perfect indicative"	meminerō, dē istōc quiētus estō (Plautus)	'I shall remember, don't worry about that'	will do, do in English

=== Present ===
The primary present is the present relative to the time of speech. Most often the present tense is construed by a "present indicative" verb. For verbs of recalling such as meminī ('I remember'), ōdī ('I hate'), nōvī ('I know') and verbs of resulting states such as mortuus est ('is dead') and dīvīsum est ('is divided'), inflections and periphrases that usually construe a past-in-present as in ēgī ('I have done') have their meanings reduced to a primary present: there is meminī ('I remember') evolved from meminī ('I have memorized') and there is mortuus est for either a present state ('he is dead') or a past-in-present event ('he has died'). (Note: Haverling (2002), p. 155.)

Similarly, the "present indicative" auxiliary in "habeō" perfect periphrasis as in habeō subōrnātum may represent either a present ownership of placed objects ("I own that clock placed over there") or the placement of owned objects with focus on the placement ("my clock is placed over there"). (Note: [The "habeō" perfect periphrasis] is not a mere circumlocution for the Perfect, but lays particular stress on the maintenance of the result, Gildersleeve & Lodge (1895), p. 160.) In contrast, the "present indicative" in "teneō" perfect periphrasis ('hold' or 'keep') represents the process of actively keeping an object in a given state while one speaks.

Simple and compound present
Paradigm	Latin Example	English translation	Comment
"present indicative"	senātus haec intellegit; cōnsul videt; hic tamen vīvit (Cicero)	'the Senate understands this; the Consul sees it; yet this man is alive'	do, are doing, have done, have been doing in English
"perfect indicative"	meminī mē adesse (Cicero)	'I remember being present'	do, are doing, have done, have been doing in English
"present indicative auxiliary in 'sum' perfect periphrasis"	passer mortuus est meae puellae (Catullus)	'my girlfriend's pet sparrow is dead	do, are doing, have done, have been doing in English
"present indicative auxiliary in 'habeō' perfect periphrasis"	Horolōgium in triclīniō et bucinātōrem habet subōrnātum, ut subinde sciat quantum dē vītā perdiderit! (Petronius)	'He has a clock and a horn set up in the triclinium to remember from time to time how much of his life he spent thus far'	have... placed in English
"present indicative auxiliary in 'teneō' perfect periphrasis"	populī Rōmānī exercitus Cn. Pompeium circumsedet, fossā et vallō saeptum tenet, fugā prohibet (Cicero)	'an army of the Roman people is besieging Gnaeus Pompey, and is keeping him fenced in with a ditch and wall, and preventing him from fleeing'	is keeping... in English

=== Past ===
The primary past is the past relative to the time of speech. In biographies, past events are usually represented by "perfect indicative" verbs. (Note: Schlicher, 1931, pp.58-59) In contrast, in narrative prose and poetry, past events are most often represented by "present indicative" verbs as if these events were taking place at the time of narration. (Note: Pinkster, 1990, p.224) In particular, past speech events are often represented by "present indicative" verbs when reporting what other people said: e.g. fidem dant ('they gave a pledge') or ōrant ('they begged'). More than half the "present indicative" verbs for past events in Caesar's books are of this kind. (Note: Viti, 2010)

However, in recounts of events long past at the time of narration, the "imperfect indicative" is used instead of "perfect indicative" or "present indicative" as if these events were being vividly remembered by a story-internal observer in distress. (Note: The most important value of occurrēbant and petēbant should be looked for on the interpersonal level: the story-internal character Caesar is surveying the battles in the different parts of the battlefield, and these are presented through his "perception". Unsurprisingly, the problems of the Roman soldiers are causing their commander considerable psychological distress. Aerts, 2018, pp.126-129) (Note: Latin speaker Aulus Gellius says that the use of the 'imperfect indicative' caedēbātur rather than the 'perfect indicative' caesus est creates a 'drawn-out vivid description' (diūtīna repraesentātiō) in Aulus Gellius 10.3.12; cf. Ker, 2007, p. 345) (Note: For past events, according to Pinkster, the "present indicative" paradigm is interchangeable with not only the "perfect indicative", but also the "imperfect indicative". Pinkster, 1990, p.240) As for word order, in Caesar's books, when a verb for a past event is placed initially in the sentence, as in the example below (videt imminēre hostēs), it is very frequently "present indicative". (Note: Devine & Laurence, 2006, p.159)

For verbs of recalling such as meminī ('I remember'), ōdī ('I hate'), nōvī ('I know') and verbs of resulting states such as mortuus est ('is dead') and dīvīsum est ('is divided'), inflections and periphrases that usually construe a past-in-past as in ēgeram ('I had done') have their meanings reduced to a primary past: there is meminī ('I remembered') evolved from meminī ('I had memorized') and there is mortuus erat for the past state ('he was dead') and the past-in-past event ('he had died').

In some contexts, the "'habeō' perfect periphrasis with present indicative auxiliary" is often interchangeable with "perfect indicative" verbs. In later Latin the compound past with habeō became progressively more common, though still less common than the simple past with a "perfect indicative" verb. (Note: Haverling, 2012, p.373)

Simple and compound past
Paradigm	Latin Example	English translation	Comment
"perfect indicative"	vēnī, vīdī, vīcī (Suetonius)	'I came, I saw, I conquered'	did in English
"present indicative"	videt imminēre hostēs ... capit arma ā proximīs ... (Caesar)	'he saw the enemy coming ... he seized weapons from those nearby ...'	did in English
"imperfect indicative"	caedēbātur virgīs in mediō forō Messanae civis rōmānus... (Cicero)	'A Roman citizen was beaten by rods in the center of Messana's main square...'	did in English
"pluperfect indicative"	meminerant ad Alesiam magnam sē inopiam perpessōs (Caesar)	'they remembered how they had put up with a great shortage at Alesia'	did in English
"present indicative auxiliary in 'sum' perfect periphrasis"	ubī occīsus est Sex. Rōscius? – Rōmae (Cicero)	'where was Sextus Roscius murdered? – in Rome'	did in English

== Secondary tenses ==
In Latin, represented events and states may be related to the time of another event in discourse, which in turn has a primary tense. Such events are said to have a secondary tense, of which there are three in Latin: namely, secondary future, secondary present and secondary past, each of which is described in a separate section below.

=== Secondary future ===
The secondary future is the future relative to a primary tense, which can be future, present, or past. Most often, the secondary future is realized by the periphrasis facturus + erō, sum, eram, fuī.

If applied to actions, the compound "future in present" (e.g. factūrus sum, 'am [going] to do') represents a person's action that is future at an ongoing process other than the speech event such as tē absente ("while you are absent"). Similarly, the compound "future in future" (e.g. factūrus erō, 'I will do') represents a person's action that will happen after a given future event. In contrast, the future periphrasis with an "imperfect indicative" auxiliary (e.g. factūrus eram, 'was about to do') represents a person's past plan of action. Although less common than the future periphrases with eram, future periphrases with a "perfect indicative" auxiliary such as fuī are also found. (Note: Gildersleeve & Lodge (1895), p. 164.)

Compound secondary future
Meaning	Paradigm	Latin Example	English translation	Comment
future in future	"future indicative auxiliary in future periphrasis"	tu tamen sī quid cum Sīliō, vel illō ipsō diē quō ad Siccam ventūrus erō, certiōrem mē velim faciās (Cicero)	'but if you come to any arrangement with Silius, even if it is on the very day I am on my way to Sicca's house, please let me know'	is planning / about to do in English
future in present	"present indicative auxiliary in future periphrasis"	Paulla Valeria ... nūptūra est D. Brūtō [tē absente]. (Cicero)	[while you are away] 'Paulla Valeria... is planning to marry Decimus Brutus'	is planning / about to do in English
future in past	"imperfect indicative auxiliary in future periphrasis"	posterō diē, cum ab eō digressus essem..., ille... in Italiam versus nāvigātūrus erat (Servius to Cicero)	'on the next day, when I left him..., he was going to sail... to Italy'	was going / about to do in English
future in past	"perfect indicative auxiliary in future periphrasis"	quō diē repulsus est, lūsit, quā nocte peritūrus fuit, lēgit (Seneca)	'on the day Cato was defeated in the election, he played; on the night he was about to die, he read'	was going / about to do in English

=== Secondary present ===
The secondary present is the present relative to a primary tense, which can be future, present or past. From these, "present in present" is the rarest one. Theare are two secondary presents in Latin: the simple secondary present is realised by verbs with īnfectum aspect such as faciam, (Note: The simple future, which is not restricted in any way, is [the future perfect's] non-anterior counterpart. There is only a limited overlap of usage in that, in certain contexts, either tense is possible. - De Melo, 2007b.) faciō, faciēbam and the compound secondary present is realised by the periphrasis facere + coeperō, coepī, coeperam. (Note: [In translations from Greek to Latin, auxiliaries such as the] inceptive ἄρχεσθαι, conative ἐπιχειρεῖν and prospective μέλλειν do occur [in source texts], yet the critical mass [of equivalents] in the source language is constituted of durative forms, six times the imperfect. Rosén, 2012, p.193) (Note: One of the many reasons for the popularity of "coepi" in narrative prose was the possibility of expressing a durative process through the perfect. [...] This suggestion gains support from the fact that in the majority of the cases the focus seems to be not on the initial moment of the action expressed by the infinitive but on its duration (cf. Wölfflin and Miodoński 1889: 69; Kurzová 1992: 214–17). Significantly, in late Latin the periphrasis is sometimes transmitted as a variant reading of imperfect tenses (Rosén 2012a: 133; 2012b: 372). – Galdi, 2016, p.254-255) (Note: [...] coepisse 'begonnen haben' [...] Denn diese Morpheme sind keine echten Verballexeme [...] Es sind grammatische Morpheme, die man 'Auxiliare' nennen kann, Morpheme die der Eirweiterung eines Verballexems ein Verb bilden. ([...] coepisse 'have begun' [...] These morphemes are not real verbal morphemes [...] They are grammatical morphemes that can be called "Auxiliaries", i.e. morphemes that make up a verb by extending a verbal lexeme.) Touratier, 2013, §532) The verb group is often accompanied by spatial and temporal adjuncts such as ibī 'there', tum 'then', and eō tempore 'at that moment'.

Simple and compound secondary present
Meaning	Paradigm	Latin Example	English translation	Comment
present in future	"future indicative"	ibī cōtīdiē tuās litterās exspectābō (Cicero)	'There, I shall be waiting for your letters every day'	will/shall be doing in English
present in future	"future perfect indicative auxiliary in 'coepī' present periphrasis"	Nam cum coeperīs deae servīre, tunc magis sentiēs frūctum tuae lībertātis. (Apuleius)	'For it is when you are serving the goddess that you will feel the fruit of your freedom.'	am doing in English
present in present	"present indicative"			am doing in English
present in present	"present indicative"	rēs hodiē minor est here quam fuit (Juvenal)	'resources are scarcer today than they used to be yesterday'	am doing in English
present in present	"perfect indicative auxiliary in 'coepī' present periphrasis"	Sub Tiberiō et Gaiō et Claudiō ūnīus familiae quasi hērēditās fuimus: locō lībertātis erit quod ēligī coepimus. (Tacitus)	'Under Tiberius, Gaius and Claudius we were like the property of a single family: [in the new regime] it should work as a substitute for freedom that we are now being selected.'	am doing in English
present in past	"imperfect indicative"	ex equō tum forte Mettius pugnābat (Livy)	'at that time (the time of his death) Mettius was fighting on horseback'	was doing in English
present in past	"pluperfect indicative auxiliary in 'coepī' present periphrasis"	Sed, quod coeperam dīcere, postquam lupus factus est, ululāre coepit et in silvās fūgit. (Petronius)	'But, as I was saying, once he turned into a wolf, he began to howl and ran away into the woods.'	was doing in English

=== Secondary past ===
The secondary past is the past relative to a primary tense, which can be future, present or past. There are three secondary pasts in Latin: 1. the simple secondary past is realised by verbs with perfectum aspect such as fēcerō, fēcī, fēceram; 2. the compound secondary past with "sum" is realised by the periphrasis factus + ero, sum, eram or fuī; and 3. the compound secondary past with "habeō" is realised by the periphrasis factum + habēbō, habeō, habēbam or habuī. In the secondary past, imperfect indicative auxiliaries such as eram and habēbam are more frequent than their perfect indicative counterparts such as fuī and habuī. (Note: Gildersleeve & Lodge (1895), p. 161, note 2.)

Simple and compound secondary past
Meaning	Paradigm	Latin Example	English translation	Comment
past in future	"future perfect indicative"	'dēsilite', inquit, 'mīlitēs, nisī vultis aquilam hostibus prōdere; egō certē meum reī pūblicae atque imperātōrī officium praestiterō (Caesar)	'Jump down, soldiers,' he said, 'unless you want to betray the eagle to the enemy. I for my part will certainly have done my own duty for the republic and the commander!'	will have done or have done in English
past in future	"future indicative of 'sum' perfect periphrasis"	ego sī cum Antoniō locūtus erō, scrībam ad tē quid āctum sit. (Cicero)	'Once I have talked to Antony, I will let you know what happened.'	will have done or have done in English
past in future	"future indicative of 'habeō' perfect periphrasis"	sed iam dē epistulīs satis dictum habēbō, sī hoc ūnum addiderō (Apuleius)	'but I will have said enough about the letters if I add this one thing'	will have done or have done in English
past in present	"perfect indicative"	et habet unde: ... dēcessit illīus pater (Petronius)	'and he has enough money: ... his father has died'	have done in English
past in present	"present indicative of 'sum' perfect periphrasis"	et habet unde: relictum est illī sestertium trecentiēs (Petronius)	'and he has enough money: he has inherited thirty million'	have done in English
past in present	"present indicative of 'habeō' perfect periphrasis"	unde ulteriōrem mēnsūram inhabitābilis plagae multō esse majōrem arbitror, nam et ā Germānia inmēnsās insulās nōn prīdem conpertās cognitum habeō. (Gaius Plinius Secundus)	'so I think the remaining extension of the inhabitable beaches is much larger, for I have learned that large islands had been discovered by the Germans not long ago.'	have done in English
past in past	"pluperfect indicative"	eādem quā vēnerat viā Elatīam rediit (Livy)	'he returned to Elatia by the same way he had come'	had done in English
past in past	"imperfect indicative of 'sum' perfect periphrasis"	prīdiē quam ego Athēnās vēnī Mytilēnās profectus erat (Cicero)	'on the day before I arrived in Athens he had departed for Mytilene'	had done in English
past in past	"perfect indicative of 'sum' perfect periphrasis"	prior nātus fuit Sophoclēs quam Eurīpidēs (nātus est) (Gellius)	'Sophocles had been born earlier than Euripides (was born)'	had done in English
past in past	"imperfect indicative of 'habeō' perfect periphrasis"	Caesar equitātum omnem quem ex omnī prōvinciā coāctum habēbat praemittit (Caesar)	'Caesar sent ahead all the cavalry which he had gathered together from the whole province'	had done in English
past in past	"perfect indicative of 'habeō' perfect periphrasis"	in montibus castra habuit posita Pompeius in cōnspectū utrōrumque oppidōrum (Caesar)	'Pompeius had placed a camp in the mountains within sight of both towns'	had done in English

== Tertiary tenses ==
=== Tertiary past ===
If the secondary past applies to an event that had happened prior to a past point in time, the tertiary past applies to a third event that had happened earlier than that. The tertiary past is realised by a "pluperfect indicative" auxiliary in either the "sum" perfect periphrasis or the "habeō" perfect periphrasis. Both the compound tertiary past with fueram and the compound tertiary past with habueram are uncommon tenses. (Note: For a similar use of a double perfect tense in indirect speech in German see de:Doppeltes Perfekt.)

Compound tertiary past
Meaning	Paradigm	Latin Example	English translation	Comment
past in past in past	"pluperfect indicative auxiliary in the 'sum' perfect periphrasis"	Erat summa inopia pabulī, adeo ut foliīs ex arboribus strictīs et tenerīs harundinum radicibus contūsīs equōs alērent, frūmenta enim, quae fuerant intrā mūnītiōnēs sata, consūmpserant (Caesar)	'There was a great scarcity of fodder, so much so that they cut leaves from the trees, pulled off soft roots of thorn trees and fed the horses with them, for by this time the corn which had earlier been sown inside the defence walls had been used up	had done earlier in English
past in past in past	"pluperfect indicative auxiliary in 'habeō' perfect periphrasis"	itaque nāvīs omnīs quās parātās habuerant ad nāvigandum prōpugnātōribus īnstrūxērunt (Caesar)	'and so they drew up and manned with fighters all the ships which they had earlier got ready for sailing'	had done earlier in English

== Bibliography ==
=== Formal descriptions ===
- De Melo, Wolfgang David Cirilo (2007a), The Sigmatic Future in Archaic Latin. in De Melo, Wolfgang David Cirilo, The Early Latin Verb System: Archaic Forms in Plautus, Terence, and Beyond Oxford: Oxford University Press. p. 171–190
- De Melo, Wolfgang David Cirilo (2007b), Simple Future and Future Perfect in Archaic Latin. in De Melo, Wolfgang David Cirilo, The Early Latin Verb System: Archaic Forms in Plautus, Terence, and Beyond Oxford: Oxford University Press. p. 21–50
- Devine, Andrew M. & Laurence D. Stephens (2006), Latin Word Order. Structured Meaning and Information. Oxford: Oxford University Press.
- Galdi, Giovanbattista (2016). On 'coepi'/'incipio' + infinitive: some new remarks. Chapter in Adams, James Noel and Vincent, Nigel. Early and late Latin: continuity or change? Cambridge University Press: Cambridge, UK, p. 246-264
- Haverling, Gerd V.M. (2002). "On the semantic functions of the Latin perfect". Amsterdam Studies in Classical Philology, Volume 10.
- Pinkster, Harm (1987). "The Strategy and Chronology of the Development of Future and Perfect Tense Auxiliaries in Latin". In Martin Harris and Paolo Ramat (eds.) Historical Development of Auxiliaries (Trends in Linguistics. Studies and Monographs, 35). De Gruyter Mouton.
- Rosén, Hannah (2012). "The late Latin coepī + infinitive construction: evidences from translated texts". in Classica et Mediaevalia, vol. 63, pp. 189–215
- Viti, Carlotta (2010). "The non-literal use of tenses in Latin, with particular reference to the praesens historicum". Revue de linguistique latine du Centre Alfred Ernout. (Posted at Zurich Open Repository and Archive, University of Zurich).

=== Functional descriptions ===
- Aerts, Simon (2018). "Tense, Aspect and Aktionsart in Classical Latin: Towards a New Approach". Symbolae Osloenses 92(1):107–149.
- Haverling, Gerd V.M. (2012). "Actionality, tense, and viewpoint". In Baldi, Philip; Cuzzolin, Pierluigi (eds.) (2012). Constituent Syntax: Adverbial Phrases, Adverbs, Mood, Tense. ISBN 978-3110205633, pp. 277–524.
- Schlicher, J. J. (1931). "The Historical Tenses and Their Functions in Latin". Classical Philology Vol. 26, No. 1 (Jan., 1931), pp. 46–59.

=== Grammar books ===
- Touratier, Christian (2013). "Lateinische Grammatik - linguistische Einführung in die lateinische Sprache". WBG: Darmstadt
- Gildersleeve, B. L. & Gonzalez Lodge (1895). Gildersleeve's Latin Grammar. 3rd Edition. (Macmillan)
- Guerreira, Augustín Ramos (2021), “Tiempo y Aspecto” in José Miguel Baños Baños, “Sintaxis Latina”, Vol. I, Consejo Superior de Investigaciones Cientificas, Madrid. ISBN 978-8400108250
- Pinkster, Harm (1990), Latin Syntax and Semantics. Chapter 11: The Latin tense system.
- Rubenbauer, Hans & Hofmann, J.B. (2018) Lateinische Grammatik. Oldenburg Schulbuchverlag GmbH, Munich. ISBN 978-3-63706940-4
