= Latin periphrases =

In Latin, there are multiple periphrases for tense and mode. Here we list the most common.

== Perfect periphrasis ==
The perfect periphrasis is composed of the sum auxiliary and a perfect participle such as ductus, ducta, ductum or by the īrī auxiliary and a supine such as ductum.

The auxiliary varies according to the speech role and number of the subject.

ego : ā Caesare : ductus sum = I : was led : by Caesar
tū : ā Caesare : ductus es = you : were led : by Caesar
homō : ā Caesare : ductus est = the man : was led : by Caesar

Moreover, the participle varies according to the gender and number of the subject.

homō : ā Caesare : ductus est = the man : was led : by Caesar
mulier : ā Caesare : ducta est = the woman : was led : by Caesar
puerī : ā Caesare : ductī sunt = the boys : were led : by Caesar

However, the supine in the "īrī infinitive" paradigm does not vary.

hominem : ā Caesare : ductum īrī = that : the man : would be led : by Caesar
mulierem : ā Caesare : ductum īrī = that : the woman : would be led : by Caesar
puerōs : ā Caesare : ductum īrī = that : the boys : would be led : by Caesar

Auxiliary paradigms in the passive perfect periphrasis
Paradigm	Latin Example	Meaning	Comment
"indicative future"	divīsum erit	past in future	'it will have been divided'
"indicative future"	divīsum erit	future	'it will be divided'
"indicative present"	divīsum est	past in present	'it has been divided'
"indicative present"	divīsum est	present	'it is divided'
"indicative present"	divīsum est	past	'it was divided'
"indicative imperfect"	divīsum erat	past in past	'it had been divided'
"indicative imperfect"	divīsum erat	past	'it was divided'
"indicative future perfect"	divīsum fuerit	past in past in future	'it will have been divided earlier'
"indicative perfect"	divīsum fuit	past in past in present	'it has been divided earlier'
"indicative perfect"	divīsum fuit	past in past	'it had been divided'
"indicative pluperfect"	divīsum fuerat	past in past in past	'it had been divided earlier'
"subjunctive present"	divīsum sit	--	'whether it is divided'
"subjunctive imperfect"	divīsum esset	--	'whether it was divided'
"subjunctive perfect"	divīsum fuerit	--	'whether it was divided'
"subjunctive pluperfect"	divīsum fuisset	--	'whether it had been divided'
"infinitive īrī"	ductum īrī	future in present	'that I will be led'
"infinitive īrī"	ductum īrī	future in past	'that I would be led'
"infinitive fore"	ductum fore	past in future in present	'that I will have been led'
"infinitive fore"	ductum fore	past in future in past	'that I was going to have been led'
"infinitive present"	ductum esse	past in present	'that I was led'
"infinitive present"	ductum esse	past in past	'that I had been led'
"infinitive perfect"	ductum fuisse	past in past in present	'that I had been led'
"infinitive perfect"	ductum fuisse	past in past in past	'that I had been led earlier'

Auxiliary paradigms in the deponent perfect periphrasis
Paradigm	Latin Example	Meaning	Comment
"indicative future"	locūtus erō	past in future	'I will have said'
"indicative present"	locūtus sum	past in present	'I have said'
"indicative present"	locūtus sum	past	'I said'
"indicative imperfect"	locūtus eram	past in past	'I had said'
"indicative future perfect"	locūtus fuerō	past in past in future	'I will have said earlier'
"indicative perfect"	locūtus fuī	past in past in present	'I have said earlier'
"indicative perfect"	locūtus fuī	past in past	'I had said'
"indicative pluperfect"	locūtus fueram	past in past in past	'I had said earlier'
"subjunctive present"	locūtus sim	--	'whether I said'
"subjunctive imperfect"	locūtus essem	--	'whether I had said'
"subjunctive perfect"	locūtus fuerim	--	--
"subjunctive pluperfect"	locūtus fuissem	--	--
"infinitive īre"	locūtum īre	future in present	'that I will say' (with the active form īre)
"infinitive īre"	locūtum īre	future in past	'that I would say' (with the active form īre)
"infinitive fore"	locūtum fore	past in future in present	'that I will have said'
"infinitive fore"	locūtum fore	past in future in past	'that I was going to have said'
"infinitive present"	locūtum esse	past in present	'that I said'
"infinitive present"	locūtum esse	past in past	'that I had said'
"infinitive perfect"	locūtum fuisse	past in past in present	'that I had said'
"infinitive perfect"	locūtum fuisse	past in past in past	'that I had said earlier'

== Habeō perfect periphrasis ==
The habeō perfect periphrasis is composed of the habeō auxiliary and a perfect participle such as occultum.

The auxiliary varies according to the speech role and number of the subject.

ego : Caesarem : occultum habeō = I : held : Caesar : hidden
tū : Caesarem : occultum habēs = you : held : Caesar : hidden
homō : Caesarem : occultum habet = the man : held : Caesar : hidden

The participle varies according to the gender and number of the object.

Caesar : hominem : occultum habet = Caesar : held : the man : hidden
Caesar : mulierem : occultam habet = Caesar : held : the woman : hidden
Caesar : puerōs : occultōs habet = Caesar : held : the boys : hidden

This became the regular way of forming the perfect in French and Italian.

Auxiliary paradigms in the habeō perfect periphrasis
Paradigm	Latin Example	Meaning	Comment
"indicative present"	occultum habeō	past	'I hid it'
"indicative future"	occultum habēbō	past in future	'I will have hidden it'
"indicative imperfect"	occultum habēbam	past in past	'I had hidden it'
"indicative perfect"	occultum habuī	past in past	'I had hidden it'
"subjunctive present"	occultum habeam	--	--
"subjunctive imperfect"	occultum habēbam	--	--
"subjunctive perfect"	occultum habuerim	--	--
"subjunctive pluperfect"	occultum habueram	--	--
"infinitive present"	occultum habēre	past in present	'that I hid it'
"infinitive present"	occultum habēre	past in past	'that I had hidden it'
"infinitive perfect"	occultum habuisse	past in past in present	'that I had hidden it'
"infinitive perfect"	occultum habuisse	past in past in past	'that I had hidden it earlier'

== Teneō perfect periphrasis ==
The teneō perfect periphrasis is composed of the teneō auxiliary and a perfect paticiple such as occultum.

The auxiliary varies according to the speech role and number of the subject.

ego : Caesarem : occultum teneō = I : held : Caesar : hidden
tū : Caesarem : occultum tenēs = you : held : Caesar : hidden
homō : Caesarem : occultum tenet = the man : held : Caesar : hidden

The participle varies according to the gender and number of the object.

Caesar : hominem : occultum tenet = Caesar : held : the man : hidden
Caesar : mulierem : occultam tenet = Caesar : held : the woman : hidden
Caesar : puerōs : occultōs tenet = Caesar : held : the boys : hidden

Auxiliary paradigms in the teneō perfect periphrasis
Paradigm	Latin Example	Meaning	Comment
"indicative future"	occultum tenēbō	present in future	'I will be keeping it hidden'
"indicative future"	occultum tenēbō	future	'I will keep it hidden'
"indicative present"	occultum teneō	present in present	'I am keeping it hidden'
"indicative present"	occultum teneō	present	'I am keeping it hidden'
"indicative imperfect"	occultum tenēbam	present in past	'I was keeping it hidden'
"indicative perfect"	occultum tenuī	past	'I kept it hidden'
"subjunctive present"	occultum teneam	--	'whether I am keeping it hidden'
"subjunctive imperfect"	occultum tenērem	--	'whether I was keeping it hidden'
"subjunctive perfect"	occultum tenuerim	--	'whether I kept it hidden'
"subjunctive pluperfect"	occultum tenuissem	--	'whether I had kept it hidden'
"infinitive present"	occultum tenēre	--	'that I am keeping it hidden'
"infinitive present"	occultum tenēre	--	'that I was keeping it hidden'
"infinitive perfect"	occultum tenuisse	--	'that I kept it hidden'
"infinitive perfect"	occultum tenuisse	--	'that I had kept it hidden'

== Future periphrasis ==
The future periphrasis is composed of the sum auxiliary and a future paticiple such as ductūrus.

The auxiliary varies according to the speech role and number of also the subject.

ego : Caesarem : ductūrus eram = I : would lead : Caesar
tū : Caesarem : ductūrus erās = you : would lead : Caesar
homō : Caesarem : ductūrus erat = the man : would lead : Caesar

The participle varies according to the gender and number of the subject.

homō : Caesarem : ductūrus erat = the man : would lead : Caesar
mulier : Caesarem : ductūra erat = the woman : would lead : Caesar
puerī : Caesarem : ductūrī sunt = the boys : would lead : Caesar

Auxiliary paradigms in the future periphrasis
Paradigm	Latin example	Meaning	Comment
"indicative future"	ductūrus erō	--	'I will be going to lead'
"indicative present"	ductūrus sum	--	'I am going to lead'
"indicative imperfect"	ductūrus eram	--	'I was going to lead'
"indicative future perfect"	--	--	--
"indicative perfect"	ductūrus fuī	--	'I was going to lead'
"indicative pluperfect"	ductūrus fueram	--	'I had been going to lead'
"subjunctive present"	ductūrus sim	--	'whether I am going to lead'
"subjunctive imperfect"	ductūrus essem	--	'whether I was going to lead'
"subjunctive perfect"	ductūrus fuerim	--	'whether I would have led'
"subjunctive pluperfect"	ductūrus fuissem	--	'whether I had been going to lead'
"infinitive present"	ductūrum esse	--	'that I am going to lead'
"infinitive present"	ductūrum esse	--	'that I was going to lead'
"infinitive perfect"	ductūrum fuisse	--	'that I was going to lead'
"infinitive perfect"	ductūrum fuisse	--	'that I had been going to lead'

== Future infinitive periphrases ==
The future infinitive periphrases are composed of one of three auxiliaries (fore, futūrum or futūrum esse), the word ut and a verb from one of two verb paradigms ("present subjunctive" or "imperfect subjunctive").

The auxiliary does not vary.

The verb varies according to the speech role and number of the subject.

fore ut : ego : Caesarem : dūcerem = that: I : would lead : Caesar
fore ut : tū : Caesarem : dūcerēs = that: you : would lead : Caesar
fore ut : homō : Caesarem : dūceret = that: the man : would lead : Caesar

Auxiliary paradigms in the fore future infinitive periphrasis
Paradigm	Latin example	Meaning	Comment
"subjunctive present"	fore ut dūcam	future in present	'that I will lead'
"subjunctive present"	fore ut dūcar	future in present	'that I will be led'
"subjunctive imperfect"	fore ut dūcerem	future in past	'that I was going to lead'
"subjunctive imperfect"	fore ut dūcerer	future in past	'that I was going to be led'

Auxiliary paradigms in the futūrum future infinitive periphrasis
Paradigm	Latin example	Meaning	Comment
"subjunctive present"	futūrum ut dūcam	future in present	'that I will lead'
"subjunctive present"	futūrum ut dūcar	future in present	'that I will be led'
"subjunctive imperfect"	futūrum ut dūcerem	future in past	'that I was going to lead'
"subjunctive imperfect"	futūrum ut dūcerer	future in past	'that I was going to be led'

Auxiliary paradigms in the futūrum esse future infinitive periphrasis
Paradigm	Latin example	Meaning	Comment
"subjunctive present"	futūrum esse ut dūcam	future in present	'that I will lead'
"subjunctive present"	futūrum esse ut dūcar	future in present	'that I will be led'
"subjunctive imperfect"	futūrum esse ut dūcerem	future in past	'that I was going to lead'
"subjunctive imperfect"	futūrum esse ut dūcerer	future in past	'that I was going to be led'

== Gerundive periphrasis ==
The gerundive periphrasis (aka periphrastic conjugation of the passive) is composed of the sum auxiliary and a gerundive such as dūcendus.

The auxiliary varies according to the speech role and number of the subject.

ego : ā Caesare : dūcendus eram = I : needed to be led : by Caesar
tū : ā Caesare : dūcendus erās = you : needed to be led : by Caesar
homō : ā Caesare : dūcendus erat = the man : needed to be led : by Caesar

The participle varies according to the gender and number of the subject.

homō : ā Caesare : dūcendus erat = the man : needed to be led : by Caesar
mulier : ā Caesare : dūcenda erat = the woman : needed to be led : by Caesar
puerī : ā Caesare : dūcendī erant = the boys : needed to be led : by Caesar

Although the gerundive periphrasis is similar to the future periphrasis in appearance, they are not parallel in meaning nor function. Woodcock writes of the gerundive periphrasis: "But for the introduction of the idea of necessity, it would form a periphrastic future passive tense parallel to the periphrastic future active."

Auxiliary paradigms in the gerundive periphrasis
Paradigm	Latin Example	Meaning	Comment
"indicative future"	dūcendus erō	--	'I will need to be led'
"indicative present"	dūcendus sum	--	'I need to be led'
"indicative imperfect"	dūcendus eram	--	'I needed to be led'
"indicative future perfect"	dūcendus fuerō	--	'I will have needed to be led'
"indicative perfect"	dūcendus fuī	--	'I have needed to be led'
"indicative pluperfect"	dūcendus fueram	--	'I had needed to be led'
"subjunctive foret"	dūcendus forem	--	'whether I will need to be led'
"subjunctive present"	dūcendus sim	--	'whether I need to be led'
"subjunctive imperfect"	dūcendus essem	--	'whether I needed to be led'
"subjunctive perfect"	dūcendus fuerō	--	'whether I have needed to be led'
"subjunctive pluperfect"	dūcendus fuissem	--	'whether I had needed to be led'
"infinitive fore"	dūcendum fore	--	'that I will need to be led'
"infinitive fore"	dūcendum fore	--	'that I would need to be led'
"infinitive fore"	dūcendum fore	future in present	'that I will be led'
"infinitive fore"	dūcendum fore	future in past	'that I would be led'
"infinitive present"	dūcendum esse	--	'that I need to be led'
"infinitive present"	dūcendum esse	--	'that I needed to be led'
"infinitive perfect"	dūcendum fuisse	--	'that I needed to be led'
"infinitive perfect"	dūcendum fuisse	--	'that I had needed to be led'

== Coepī present periphrasis ==
The coepī present periphrasis is composed of the coepī auxiliary and an infinitive such as dūcere.

The auxiliary varies according to the speech role and number of the subject.

ego : Caesarem : dūcere coeperam = I : was leading : Caesar
tū : Caesarem : dūcere coeperās = you : were leading : Caesar
homō : Caesarem : dūcere coeperat = the man : was leading : Caesar

The infinitive does not vary.

Auxiliary paradigms in the coepī periphrasis
Paradigm	Latin Example	Meaning	Comment
"indicative future perfect"	dūcere coeperō	present in future	'I will be leading'
"indicative perfect"	dūcere coepī	present in present	'I am leading'
"indicative pluperfect"	dūcere coeperam	present in past	'I was leading'
"subjunctive perfect"	dūcere coeperim	--	'whether I am leading'
"subjunctive pluperfect"	dūcero coepissem	--	'whether I was leading'
"infinitive perfect"	dūcere coepisse	--	'that I am leading'
"infinitive perfect"	dūcere coepisse	--	'that I was leading'
