= Latin tenses in commands (semantics) =

Grammar of the Latin language

From a semantic perspective, a tense is a temporal circumstance in which an event takes place relative to a given point in time. (Note: "Tense" is a "deictic" category, by which the state of affairs expressed by the predication is located in time. – Pinkster, 1990, 11.1.2) (Note: Tense is a deictic (meta)category: it is concerned with (external) temporality, i.e. the temporal location of a state of affairs with respect to the speaker-now context (or "deictic centre", "moment of speech/writing", "speech time"). – Aerts, 2018, p.108) (Note: Es lo que llamamos "tiempo": la categoría deíctica morfosintáctica que determina la situación en el tiempo del evento expresado por el verbo con respecto a un punto de referencia. (This is what we call "tense": the deictic morphosyntactic category that determines the temporal circumstance of the event represented by the verb relative to a reference point [in time].) – Augustín Ramos Guerreira, 2021, "Tiempo y Aspecto" in José Miguel Baños Baños, "Sintaxis Latina", Vol. I, p.479) It is absolute (primary) if it relates the represented event to the time of the speech event (Note: Absolute tense relates a state of affairs directly to the speaker-now context (e.g. the actual and historic present, the narrative perfect, the future). – Aerts, 2018, p.108) (Note: 'The state of affairs can [...] be related to the moment of writing or speaking. – Pinkster, 1990, 11.1.2) (Note: Tiempo absoluto es aquella marca por la que la formación verbal señala directamente un momento del tiempo con relación al punto de referencia. (absolute tense is the mark by which the verbal wording directly points out a temporal circumstance relative to a reference point.) – Guerreira, 2021, p.481) (Note: von der Gengenwart des Sprechenden aus gehört ein Geschehen einer der drei Zeitstufen Gegenwart, Vergangenheit, Zukunft an: selbständiger oder absoluter Tempusgebrauch. (regarding the temporal circumstance of the speaking person, the event belongs to one of three periods Present, Past and Future: standalone or absolute tense.) – Hans Rubenbauer & J.B. Hofmann, 2018, "Lateinische Grammatik", §209) and it is relative if it relates the represented event to the time of another event in the context of discourse. (Note: Relative tense is subordinate to a matrix verb phrase (participles and infinitives). – Aerts, 2018, p.108) (Note: 'or [the state of affairs can be related] to another moment known from context or situation. – Pinkster, 1990, 11.1.2) (Note: Es tiempo relativo si la formación verbal señala un momento del tiempo anterior, simultáneo o posterior a otro momento distinto al punto de referencia. (the tense is relative if the verbal phrase determines a temporal circumstance that is anterior, interior or posterior to a time other than the reference point.) – Guerreira, 2021, p.481) (Note: von der Zeit einer anderen Handlung aus gesehen ist ein Geschehen entweder gleichzeitig, vorzeitig oder nachzeitig: bezogener oder relativer Tempusgebrauch. (the event is either interior, anterior or posterior regarding another event.) – Hans Rubenbauer & J.B. Hofmann, 2018, "Lateinische Grammatik", §209) In turn, a relative tense may be "relative to absolute" (secondary) (Note: (i) It specifies time reference other than reference to the time of the speech event, i.e. "secondary" tense: past, present or future relative to the primary tense. – Halliday & Matthiessen (2014), "Halliday's introduction to functional grammar", p.151) if it relates the represented event to the primary tense. (Note: Absolute-relative tense relates a state of affairs to the speaker-now context via a reference point (e.g. the pluperfect, the future perfect) (Comrie, 1985). – Aerts, 2018, p.108) (Note: En ocasiones una referencia relativa puede incorporar también valores absolutos inferidos y cumplir ambas funciones. Es lo que Comrie (1985: 64-82) denomina tiempo absoluto-relativo, existente solo, como es lógico, para señalar de doble manera tiempos anteriores o posteriores al punto de referencia. – Augustín Ramos Guerreira, 2021, "Tiempo y Aspecto" in José Miguel Baños Baños, "Sintaxis Latina", Vol. I, p.482) Read more about possible tenses in the article on grammatical tense.

Imperative clauses represent actions to be carried out (read more on Imperative mood). While indicated events are placed in a timeline relative to the speech act (future, present, past), requested actions can be carried out only after the speech act, therefore imperative clauses do not vary in primary tense, the requested actions being always future. However, a task execution can be placed in a temporal circumstance relative to another event—after, while or before that event—which means imperative clauses may carry a secondary tense.

== Primary tense ==
An enacted command is a command that is being enacted by the speaker or writer, as opposed to commands reported by them (direct speech). In turn, a direct command is a command that is made by the speaker or writer and to be understaken by the listerner or reader, as opposed to indirect commands via a messenger. Moreover, one can represent the act of commanding as in "I am telling you to..." to perform the represented act. Such clauses are performative because they represent what the person is doing in saying that clause. Finally, one can imply a command such as "come with us" by making a question such as "would you come with us?". Since such questions imply a command, they can function as a command in dialogue, an act of commanding in saying (illocution), thus such speech acts are called "indirect speech acts" because they do not map onto the imperative mode of representing events. This section covers only "direct speech acts" in primary tense whereby a command in saying is realised by a command in wording, no indirect speech act involved. This includes all grammatical structures for enacted direct commands in primary tense for different process types, for both positive and negative commands, and for commands accompanied by a performative clause. The section is divided into four subsections, depending on whether the commands are enacted or reported and on whether the commands are direct between sender and addressee or indirect via messengers.

=== Enacted direct commands ===
Commands enactd by the command giver directly to the command receiver vary in structure according to the process type, whether the command is positive or negative, and the absence or presence of a performative clause.

==== Positive commands ====
The present imperative mood is the normal tense used for giving direct orders which the speaker wishes to be carried out at once. The active form can be made plural by adding -te:

dā mī bāsia mīlle, deinde centum! (Catullus)
'give me a thousand kisses, then a hundred!'

date dexterās fidemque! (Livy)
'give me your right hands and your oath!'

Deponent verbs such as proficīscor 'I set out' or sequor 'I follow' have an imperative ending in -re or -minī (plural):

patent portae: proficīscere! (Cicero)
'the gates are open: depart!'

sequiminī mē hūc intrō ambae (Terence)
'follow me this way inside, both of you'

The future can also be used for polite requests, as when Cicero sends greetings to his friend Atticus's wife and daughter:

Pīliae salūtem dīcēs et Atticae (Cicero)
'please give my greetings to Pilia and Attica'

==== Negative commands ====
An imperative is usually made negative by using nōlī(te) (literally, 'be unwilling!') plus the infinitive:

nōlīte mīrārī (Seneca the Elder)
'don't be surprised'

However, in poetry an imperative can sometimes be made negative with the particle nē:

nē mē terrēte timentem, obscēnae volucrēs! (Virgil)
'do not terrify me, who am already scared, obscene birds!'

A negative order can also use the perfect subjunctive:

dē mē nihil timuerīs (Cicero)
'do not be afraid on my account'

In later Latin, nē plus the present subjunctive became more common, for example in the Vulgate Bible. In the following example the first three verbs use the present subjunctive, and the third the perfect subjunctive:

nē adulterēs, nē occīdās, nē fūrēris, nē falsum testimōnium dīxerīs (Mark)
'do not commit adultery, do not kill, do not steal, do not speak false testimony'

==== Meminī, sciō, habeō ====
In commands to recall something from now on, verbs of remembering (meminī) are exclusively used in the "future imperative" form because they relate the act of recalling to the addressee's future act of fully receiving the information. Since the reception of the information is often concurrent to the act of speaking, this concurrency often amounts to a reduction from a secondary tense ("future in future") to a primary tense ("future"). In letters, the current time ("now") is often set to the time of reading, in which case the tense reduction occurs for other verbs of knowing such as sciō and habeō.

Imperative mode for 'meminī' (remember) and 'sciō' (know)
Paradigm	Latin example	English translation
"future imperative"	cēterum mementōte parendum magis vōbīs esse quam suādendum. (Valerius)	'but remember that your job is more to prepare [for war] than to suade [me].'
"future imperative"	fīliolō me auctum scītō, salvā Terentiā (Cicero)	'know that I have been blessed with a little son and that Terentia is safe'

==== With performative clause ====
Performative clauses look like statements but could not possibly be true nor false. Such clauses do not have warning signs such as might be, could be, should be. When someone utters one, we can say they are doing the speech act represented by the clause rather than telling to the addressee whether the represented action took, is taking or will take place. (Note: I want to discuss a kind of utterance which looks like a statement and grammatically, I suppose, would be classed as a statement, which is not nonsensical, and yet is not true or false. These are not going to be utterances which contain curious verbs like "could" or "might", or curious words like "good", which many philosophers regard nowadays simply as danger signals. They will be perfectly straightforward utterances, with ordinary verbs in the first person singular present indicative active, and yet we shall see at once that they couldn't possibly be true or false. Furthermore, if a person makes an utterance of this sort we should say that he is doing something rather than merely saying something. – Austin, "performative utterances", corrected transcript of an unscripted radio talk delivered in the Third Programme of the BBC, 1979.) So a speaker can make a command not only by uttering the command as in dīlige mē ('love me'), but also by uttering a performative clause as in tē, ut dīligās mē, rōgō ('I am asking you to love me'), whereby the performative clause represents the act of making a command that the speaker is doing. In this case, the action of the imperative clause is represented by a "subjunctive present" verb rather than an "imperative" one.

Enacted direct command with performative clause
Paradigm	Latin example	English translation
"present subjunctive"	tē, ut dīligās mē, sī, mutuō tē factūrum, scīs, rōgō. (Cicero)	'I am asking you to love me, 'cause you know you will be loved in return.'

=== Reported and indirect commands ===
An imperative clause is a clause whereby one performs an imperative act, whereby one makes a command. Once a command is enacted by someone, it can be cited or reported by others. (Note: Sometimes an ut clause simply expresses a command, wish, desire, hope, etc., without any strong meaning of purpose or result. – Ut Clauses of Purpose, Result and Indirect Command, The Latin Library) (Note: One of the most pervasive features of "narrative texts" is the reporting of what was said. – Carmen Rosa Caldas-Coulthard, "Reporting speech in narrative discourse: stylistic and ideological implications Reporting speech in narrative discourse: stylistic and ideological implications", April 2008, Ilha do Desterro) Most often, the action in the reported command is represented by "subjuctive imperfect" verbs.

Reported direct command
Paradigm	Latin example	English translation
"imperfect subjunctive"	mē, ut venīrem copiāsque conjungerem, rōgāvit. (Cicero)	'he asked me to come and join the battalions.'

Note: In Latin studies, reported commands are often called "indirect commands".

In turn, a speaker can make a command directly to the person who is supposed to carry out the task or indirectly through intermediaries. In indirect commands and specifically in law proposals, the actions are often represented by "indirect imperative" verbs (see verb paradigms). Alternatively, indirect commands can be realised by commands to make a command 'tell him to come' (eum rōgā, ut veniat), in which case the action to be carried out is represented by a "present subjunctive" verb.

Enacted indirect command
Paradigm	Latin example	English translation
"indirect imperative"	jūsta imperia suntō, īsque cīvēs modestē [...] pārentō. (Cicero)	'there should be lawful authorities, and the citizens should strictly obey them.'
"present subjunctive"	eum rōgā, ut relinquat aliās rēs et hūc veniat. (Plautus)	'tell him to stop other things and come here.'

Note: In Latin studies, "indirect commands" are often called "3rd person imperative".

Once the indirect command is enacted to an intermediary, the intermediary is supposed to propagate the command to the task executer. There are two ways whereby the command initiator is revealed in the propagated indirect command. Either by a propagative performative clause such as 'Thyillus is telling you to administer the fatherland' (Thyillus tē rōgat, ut patria cūrēs) or by a performative clause that is temporally (and causally) linked to another performative clause as in 'I am asking you at Thyillus's request to administer the fatherland' (ego tē rōgō, Thyillī rōgātū, ut patria cūrēs). In both cases, since the imperative clause is accompanied by a performative clause, the action to be carried out is represented by a "present subjunctive" verb.

Propagated indirect command
Paradigm	Latin example	English translation
"present subjunctive"	Petō abs tē, ut haec dīligenter cūrēs. Thyillus tē rōgat et ego eius rōgātū Eymolpidon patria. (Cicero)	'I am asking from you to administer this with love. Thyillus is telling you and I am telling you at his request (to administer) the fatherland of Eumolpidon.'

Finally, indirect commands may also be reported. In such cases, the action is represented by "imperfect subjunctive" verbs.

Reported indirect command
Paradigm	Latin example	English translation
"imperfect subjunctive"	cum [...] quod petierat per litterās ipse, ut māturārem venīre, praestō mihī fuit stator ejus cum litterīs, quībus, nē venīrem, dēnuntiābat. (Cicero)	'while [...] because he himself had asked me by letter to come earlier, I was lent his stader by a letter, wherein he spread the word for me not to come.'

== Secondary tense ==
A task execution can be temporally related to a future event, in which case the action is to be carried out before, during or after that event. In such cases, the requested action is represented by "future imperative" verbs. The imperative mode of representing actions relative to future events is very frequent in text by early writers (Plautus and Cato) and sporadically found in texts by later authors (Cicero and Martial).

Examples of "future imperative" clauses - relative tense
Inner Meaning	Outer Meaning	Paradigm	Latin example	English translation	Comment
relative to future	future in future	"future imperative"	sī quid acciderit, ... scrībitō (Cicero)	'if anything happens, write to me'	do in English
relative to future	future in future	"future imperative"	rīdētō multum quī tē, Sextille, cinaedum dīxerit et digitum porrigitō medium (Martial)	'Sextillus, laugh a lot at anyone who calls you a "faggot" and show them the middle finger'	do in English
relative to future	future in future	"future imperative"	ubī nōs lāverimus, sī volēs, lavātō (Terence)	'when we are done with bathing, bathe yourself here if you wish'	do in English
relative to future	present in future	"future imperative"	crūdam sī edēs, in acētum intinguitō (Cato)	'if you are eating it (cabbage) raw, dip it in vinegar'	do in English
relative to future	past in future	"future imperative"	crās petitō, dabitur (Plautus)	'should you ask for it tomorrow, you will be given it'	should do in English
