= Latin verb paradigms =

Latin verb inflection organised in agreement paradigms

A verb paradigm is a set of verbs that are selected according to features such as the number, speech role and gender of event participants.

Number
Hic Caesarem videt. (He's seeing Caesar.)
Hī Caesarem vident. (They're seeing Caesar.)
Speech role
Ego Caesarem videō. (I'm seeing Caesar.)
Tū Caesarem vidēs. (You're seeing Caesar.)
Hic Caesarem videt. (He's seeing Caesar.)
Gender
Hic ā Caesare vīsus est. (He was seen by Caesar.)
Haec ā Caesare vīsa est. (She was seen by Caesar.)
Hoc ā Caesare vīsum est. (This was seen by Caesar.)

== Paradigm names ==
For each verb entry in a dictionary, there are multiple such agreement paradigms as shown in the table below. The names of the paradigms are taken from Langenscheidt Dictionary, completed and adapted.

Completions and adaptions: The paradigms "imperative indirect active", "imperative indirect passive", "supine genitive", "supine dative" are not present in this dictionary because they are rare in the Classical Period, however they are accounted for in Grammar books and articles. The paradigms for "supine accusative" and "supine ablative" are called "Supine I" and "Supine II" in the Langenscheidt dictionary, but often called "supine accusative" and "supine ablative" in academic articles when compared with the other two.

Agreement paradigms
Paradigm name	____1____	____2____	____3____	____4____	____5____	____6____
indicative future active	vidēbō	vidēbis	vidēbit	vidēbimus	vidēbitis	vidēbunt
indicative future passive	vidēbor	vidēberis	vidēbitur	vidēbimur	vidēbiminī	vidēbuntur
indicative present active	videō	vidēs	videt	vidēmus	vidētis	vident
indicative present passive	videor	vidēris	vidētur	vidēmur	vidēminī	videntur
indicative imperfect active	vidēbam	vidēbās	vidēbat	vidēbāmus	vidēbātis	vidēbant
indicative imperfect passive	vidēbar	vidēbāris	vidēbātur	vidēbāmur	vidēbāminī	vidēbantur
indicative future perfect	vīderō	vīderis	vīderit	vīderimus	vīderitis	vīderint
indicative perfect	vīdī	vīdistī	vīdit	vīdimus	vīdistis	vīdērunt
indicative pluperfect	vīderam	vīderās	vīderat	vīderāmus	vīderātis	vīderant
subjunctive present active	videam	videās	videat	videāmus	videātis	videant
subjunctive present passive	videar	videāris	videātur	videāmur	videāminī	videantur
subjunctive imperfect active	vidērem	vidērēs	vidēret	vidērēmus	vidērētis	vidērent
subjunctive imperfect passive	vidērer	vidērēris	vidērētur	vidērēmur	vidērēminī	vidērentur
subjunctive perfect	vīderim	vīderīs	vīderit	vīderīmus	vīderītis	vīderit
subjunctive pluperfect	vīdissem	vīdissēs	vīdisset	vīdissēmus	vīdissētis	vīdissent
imperative active	––	vidē	––	––	vidēte	––
imperative passive	––	vidēre	––	––	vidēminī	––
imperative future active	––	vidētō	––	––	vidētōte	––
imperative future passive	––	vidētor	––	––	vidēminō	––
imperative indirect active	––	––	vidētō	––	––	videntō
imperative indirect passive	––	––	vidētor	––	––	videntor
infinitive present active	vidēre					
infinitive present passive	vidī					
infinitive perfect	vīdisse					
participle future nominative	vīsūrus	vīsūra	vīsūrum	vīsūrī	vīsūrae	vīsūra
participle future accusative	vīsūrum	vīsūram	vīsūrum	vīsūrōs	vīsūrās	vīsūra
participle future genitive	vīsūrī	vīsūrae	vīsūrī	vīsūrōrum	vīsūrārum	vīsūrōrum
participle future dative	vīsūrō	vīsūrae	vīsūrō	vīsūrīs	vīsūrīs	vīsūrīs
participle future ablative	vīsūrō	vīsūrā	vīsūrī	vīsūrīs	vīsūrīs	vīsūrīs
participle present nominative	vidēns		vidēns	videntēs		videntia
participle present accusative	videntem		vidēns	videntēs		videntia
participle present genitive	videntis		videntis	videntium		videntium
participle present dative	videntī		videntī	videntibus		videntibus
participle present ablative	vidente		vidente	videntibus		videntibus
participle past nominative	vīsus	vīsa	vīsūrō	vīsī	vīsae	vīsa
participle past accusative	vīsum	vīsam	vīsum	vīsōs	vīsās	vīsa
participle past genitive	vīsī	vīsae	vīsī	vīsōrum	vīsārum	vīsōrum
participle past dative	vīsō	vīsae	vīsō	vīsīs	vīsīs	vīsīs
participle past ablative	vīsō	vīsā	vīsō	vīsīs	vīsīs	vīsīs
gerundive nominative	videndus	videnda	videndum	videndī	videndae	videnda
gerundive accusative	videndum	videndam	videndum	videndōs	videndās	videnda
gerundive genitive	videndī	videndae	videndī	videndōrum	videndārum	videndōrum
gerundive dative	videndō	videndae	videndō	videndīs	videndīs	videndīs
gerundive ablative	videndō	videndā	videndō	videndīs	videndīs	videndīs
supine accusative	vīsum					
supine genitive	vīsūs					
supine dative	vīsuī					
supine ablative	vīsū					
gerund accusative	videndum					
gerund genitive	videndī					
gerund dative	videndō					
gerund ablative	videndō					

== Types of agreement paradigm ==
Latin has two major types of agreement paradigms with two or more verbs as shown in the tables below:

Number + Speech role
number	speech role	indicative present active	indicative present passive	indicative perfect
singular	speaker	amō	amor	amāvī
singular	addressee	amās	amāris	amāvistī
singular	other	amat	amātur	amāvit
plural	+speaker	amāmus	amāmur	amāvimus
plural	–speaker +addressee	amātis	amāminī	amāvistis
plural	–speaker –addressee	amant	amantur	amāvērunt

Number + Gender
number	gender	participle past nominative	participle past accusative
singular	masculine	amātus	amātum
singular	feminine	amāta	amātam
singular	neuter	amātum	amātum
plural	+masculine	amātī	amātōs
plural	–masculine +feminine	amātae	amātās
plural	–masculine +neuter	amāta	amāta

== Rare supines ==
Some supines are rare, but they do occur althroughout the Classical Period. Following the grammatical pattern whereby supines combine with verbs of motion, we see two semantic patterns: events taking place either where the motion starts or where it ends. We also see supines as the event performed by speech acts.

=== Events at origin ===
The ablative supine represents a state change at the origin of motion.

- Prīmus cubitū surgat, postrēmus cubitum eat.
  He should be the first to rise from sleep and the last to go to lie down.

=== Events at destination ===
The accusative supine represents a state change at the destination of motion.

- Prīmus cubitū surgat, postrēmus cubitum eat.
  He should be the first to rise from sleep and the last to go to lie down.

=== Events commanded by speech acts ===
The dative supine represents an event commanded by a speech act.

- Quid enim revocante et receptuī canente senātū properet dīmicāre?
  Why else would he hasten to fight the senate which was recalling and calling retreat?
- Mēdiā nocte receptuī signum dedit.
  At midnight, he gave a sign to retreat.

=== Events in periphrases ===
The genitive supine may occur in periphrasis for an immediate future in the present.

- Quid ferat ignorās, et nunc tibī summa pavōris nuntīus armōrum tristis rumorque sinister. Victūs adest conjūnx. Quid perdis tempora luctūs?
  You don't how [your partner] is doing and now you hold the utmost fear of sad war news and a few sinister rumours. Your partner is about to win. Why do you waste time mourning?

And the ablative supine may occur in periphrasis for possible undesirable future in the present.

- Grāvidae quīdem fēminae, quibus tum adest partūs, abortū periclitantur.
  Indeed, pregnant women, who are about to give birth, risk aborting.
- Sī mūlier contrā patrōnum suum ingrāta facta, sciēns sē ingrātam, cum dē suō statū periclitābātur, aliquid patrōnō dederit, vel prōmīserit, nē in servitūtem redigātur.
  If a [freed] woman commits an ingratitude against her patron, knowing that she is being ungreatful, when she risks being by herself, she must give or promise to give something to her patron to avoid being put back to slavery.
