= Latin tenses in dependent clauses =

In Latin, there are different modes of indicating past, present and future processes. There is the basic mode of free clauses and there are multiple dependent modes found exclusively in dependent clauses. In particular, there is the "infinitive" mode for reported satetements and the "subjunctive" mode for reported questions.

== Tenses in "infinitive" mode ==
In reports of statements or ideas and in statements of facts known by others, the subject is represented by an "accusative" noun and the event is represented by an "infinitive" verb or verb group. For this reason, the structure of a reported statement is known as "accusative and infinitive". Usually an "infinitive" verb or verb group represents an event at relative time: the event is either future, present or past at the time of the reported statement. Often the verb of speaking, knowing, expecting or hoping is omitted, but can be recovered from the context of discourse or situation.

Map from basic mode to "infinitive" mode in dependent clauses
Meaning	Basic mode	"Infinitive" mode	Comment
future in past	ductūrus eram	ductūrum	'would lead'
future in past	ductūrus eram	ductūrum esse	'would lead'
future in past	ductūrus eram	ductum īre	'would lead'
future in past	ductūrus eram	fore ut dūcerem	'would lead'
future in past	ductūrus eram	futūrum ut dūcerem	'would lead'
future in past	ductūrus eram	futūrum esse ut dūcerem	'would lead'
present in past	dūcēbam	dūcere	'was leading'
past in past	dūxeram	dūxisse	'had led'
past in past	dūxeram	ductum habēre	'had led'
past in past in past	ductum habueram	ductum habuisse	'had led earlier'
future in past	dūcendus eram	ductum īrī	'would be led'
future in past	dūcendus eram	dūcendum fore	'would be led'
future in past	dūcendus eram	fore ut dūcerer	'would be led'
future in past	dūcendus eram	futūrum ut dūcerer	'would be led'
future in past	dūcendus eram	futūrum esse ut dūcerer	'would be led'
present in past	dūcēbātur	dūcī	'was leading'
past in past	ductus eram	ductum esse	'had been led'
past in future in past	ductus fuerō	ductum fore	'would haven been led'
past in past in past	ductus fueram	ductum fuisse	'had earlier been led'

=== Secondary tense ===
==== Secondary future ====
"Infinitive" verb groups can represent an event that is future at the time of saying, knowing, expecting or hoping.

The "active infinitive" mode is often realised by a simple accusative future participle. The "passive infinitive" mode can be realised by the "īrī infinitive" paradigm of the perfect periphrasis, but this option is comparatively rare. There are three additional future infinitive periphrases for both active and passive/deponent verbs.

Examples of "infinitive" dependent clauses - secondary future
Inner Meaning	Outer Meaning	Paradigm	Latin example	English translation	Comment
relative future	future in present	"present infinitive of periphrastic future"	cōnfīdō, tē factūrum esse omnia (Cicero)	'I believe in you that you will do everything'	[the fact] that x will do in English
relative future	future in past	"accusative of future participle"	locum ubī esset facile inventūrōs (Nepos)	'(he said) that they would easily find the place where he was'	[the fact] that x would do in English
relative future	future in past	"accusative of future participle"	cōnfīdo mē celeriter ad urbem ventūrum (Cicero)	'I am sure that I will come to the city soon'	[the fact] that x would do in English
relative future	future in past	"īre infinitive of periphrastic perfect"	Ōthōnem ac Vitellium scelēstīs armīs rēs Rōmānās raptum īre vulgātum est (Tacitus)	'it was reported that Otho and Vitellius would seize Roman property with their wicked weapons'	[the fact] that x would do in English
relative future	future in past	"īrī infinitive of periphrastic perfect"	rūmor vēnit, datum īrī gladiātōrēs (Terence)	'there came a rumour that a gladiator show would be given'	[the fact] that x would do in English
relative future	future in past	"fore infinitive of periphrastic gerundive"	senēscendum fore tantum terrārum vel sine proeliō obeuntī (Curtius)	'(he had written that) a person would get old visiting such a huge country while without war'	[the fact] that x would do in English
future in present		"present subjunctive of periphrastic 'fore' future infinitive"	spērō, fore ut contingat id nōbīs (Cicero)	'I hope that we shall have that good fortune'	[the fact] that x will do in English
future in past		"imperfect subjunctive of periphrastic 'fore' future infinitive"	respondērunt Chaldaeī, fore ut imperāret, mātremque occīderet (Tacitus)	'the astrologers replied that (Nero) would become Emperor, but that he would kill his mother'	[the fact] that x would do in English
future in past		"imperfect subjunctive of periphrastic 'fore' future infinitive"	omnēs id fore putābant ut miser virgīs caederētur (Cicero)	'they all expected that the poor man would be beaten with rods'	[the fact] that x would do in English
future in past		"imperfect subjunctive of periphrastic 'futūrum esse' future infinitive"	futūrum esse, nisī prōvisum esset, ut Rōma caperētur (Cicero)	'(the informant predicted) that unless precautions were taken, Rome would be captured'	[the fact] that x would do in English

==== Secondary present ====
A "present infinitive" verb represents an event that is present at the time of stating, perceiving or knowing.

Examples of "infinitive" dependent clauses - secondary present
Inner Meaning	Outer Meaning	Paradigm	Latin example	English translation	Comment
relative present	present in past	"present infinitive"	sēnsit in sē īrī Brutus (Livy)	'Brutus noticed that an attack was being made on him'	[the fact] that x was doing in English

==== Secondary past ====
For active verbs, a "perfect infinitive" verb represents an event that is past at the time of stating, perceiving or knowing. Alternatively, the "present infinitive" paradigms of the "habeō" perfect periphrasis can also represent a past event at the time of stating, stressing that the result is present at that time.

For passive and deponent verbs, the relative past event is represented by either the "present infinitive" paradigm of the perfect periphrasis or a simple accusative perfect participle.

When it comes to remembering (meminī), a "present infinitive" verb represents an event that is present at the time of perceiving, but past at the time of remembering.

Examples of "infinitive" dependent clauses - secondary past
Inner Meaning	Outer Meaning	Paradigm	Latin example	English translation	Comment
relative past	past in present	"perfect infinitive"	patrem lanium fuisse, ferunt (Livy)	'they say that his father was a butcher'	[the fact] that x did in English
relative past	past in present	"perfect infinitive"	dīcitur, eō tempore mātrem Pausaniae vīxisse (Nepos)	'it is said that at that time the mother of Pausanias was still living'	[the fact] that x did in English
relative past	past in present	"present infinitive of periphrastic perfect"	lictōrem tuum occīsum esse, dīcis (Cicero)	'you are saing that your bodyguard was killed'	[the fact] that x did in English
relative past	past in present	"present infinitive"	meminī, mē intrāre scholam eius, cum recitātūrus esset in Milōnem (Seneca the Elder)	'I remember that I went into his school when he was just about to recite a speech against Milo'	[the fact] that x did in English
relative past	past in past	"perfect infinitive"	cognōvērunt, Caesarem vēnisse ([Caesar])	'they learnt that Caesar had come'	[the fact] that x had done in English
relative past	past in past	"perfect infinitive"	rem atrōcem incidisse (Livy)	'a terrible thing had happened' (she said)	[the fact] that x had done in English
relative past	past in past	"perfect infinitive"	mihī nūntiāvit, M. Marcellum pugiōne percussum esse, et duo vulnera accēpisse (Servius to Cicero)	'he reported to me that Marcus Marcellus had been stabbed with a dagger and had received two wounds'	[the fact] that x had done in English
relative past	past in past	"present infinitive of the pariphrastic 'habeō' perfect"	sē ita triennium illud praetūrae Siciliēnsis distribūtum habēre, ut ... (Cicero)	'(Verres is said to have claimed that) he had divided up that three-year period of his Sicilian praetorship in such a way that...'	[the fact] that x had done in English
relative past	past in past	"present infinitive of periphrastic perfect"	mihī nūntiāvit, M. Marcellum pugiōne percussum esse, et duo vulnera accēpisse (Servius to Cicero)	'he reported to me that Marcus Marcellus had been stabbed with a dagger and had received two wounds'	[the fact] that x had done in English
relative past	past in past	"accusative perfect participle"	frātrem interfectum audīvit (Seneca)	'he heard that his brother had been killed'	[the fact] that x had done in English

=== Tertiary tense ===
==== Tertiary past ====
For both passive and deponent verbs, the "fore infinitive" paradigm of the perfect periphrasis can be used in reported statements for an event that is past at the time of another event, which is future at the time of the statement ("that x would soon have done", "that x will soon have done").

Occasionally a "perfect infinitive" paradigm of the perfect periphrasis is found. While the perfect periphrasis with the "present infinitive" auxiliary esse merely refers to an event which took place before the time of the reported statement (e.g. "he reported that Marcellus had been killed"), the perfect periphrasis with "perfect infinitive" auxiliary fuisse has two markers of past and it refers to an event prior to another event, which is also prior to the reported statement. Thus there are three times involved: the primary is the time of stating, the secondary is the time of another event, and the tertiary is the time of the event represented by the perfect periphrasis.

Just as a "perfect indicative" verb can represent either a past event or the present result (e.g. "he has died" = "he is dead"), so the perfect periphrasis with the "perfect infinitive" auxiliary fuisse often represent either a past-in-past event or present-in-past result at the time of the reported statement.

Examples of "infinitive" dependent clauses - tertiary past
Inner Meaning	Outer Meaning	Paradigm	Latin example	English translation	Comment
relative past in future	past in future in present	"fore infinitive of periphrastic perfect"	hoc possum dīcere, mē satis adeptum fore, sī nūllum in mē perīculum redundārit (Cicero)	'I can say this, that I will have achieved enough, if no danger redounds on me'	[the fact] that x will have done in English
relative past in future	past in future in present	"fore infinitive of periphrastic perfect"	Carthāginiēsēs dēbellātum mox fore rēbantur (Livy)	'the Carthaginians thought that the war would soon have been brought to an end'	[the fact] that x would have done in English
relative past in future	past in future in present	"fore infinitive of periphrastic perfect"	metum sī quī sustulisset, omnem vītae dīligentiam sublātam fore (Cicero)	'if someone were to remove fear, all carefulness of life would have been removed too'	[the fact] that x would have done in English
relative past in past	past in past in present	"perfect infinitive of periphrastic "habeō" perfect"	pollicērer tibī ... mē sēgregātum habuisse, uxōrem ut dūxit, ā mē Pamphilum (Terence)	'I promise you that, by the time Pamphilus got married, I had separated him from myself'	[the fact] that x had done in English
relative past in past	past in past in present	"perfect infinitive of periphrastic "habeō" perfect"	tē ... fatēris ... aurum occultum habuisse (Quintilian)	'you confess that you had hidden the gold' (prior to being accused, which is prior to confessing)	[the fact] that x had done in English
relative past in past	past in past in present	"perfect infinitive of periphrastic "habeō" perfect"	Cauniī praetereā dēbent, sed aiunt sē dēpositam pecūniam habuisse (Cicero)	'the people of Caunus also owe him money, but they say that they had already deposited a sum of money' (prior to being accused, which is prior to claiming)	[the fact] that x had done in English
relative past in past	past in past in present	"perfect infinitive of periphrastic perfect"	quod iūdicium cum agerētur, exercitum in forō collocātum ā Gn. Pompeiō fuisse ...ex ōrātiōne appāret (Asconius)	'it appears from the speech that while the trial was in progress, an army had been stationed in the forum by Gnaeus Pompeius'	[the fact] that x had done in English
relative past in past	past in past in present	"perfect infinitive of periphrastic perfect"	tūn mēd indūtum fuisse pallam praedicās? (Plautus)	'are you saying that (at the time when you saw me) I had dressed a lady's mantle?'	[the fact] that x had done in English
relative past in past	past in past in present	"perfect infinitive of periphrastic perfect"	dēprehēnsus dēnique cum ferrō ad senātum is quem ad Cn. Pompeium interimendum conlocātum fuisse cōnstābat (Cicero)	'finally a man who, it was established, had been stationed there to kill Gnaeus Pompeius was arrested with a weapon near the Senate'	[the fact] that x had done in English
relative past in past	past in past in present	"perfect infinitive of periphrastic perfect"	satis est ... docēre magnam eī spem in Milōnis morte prōpositam ... fuisse (Cicero)	'it is sufficient to show that (at the time he was killed) for Clodius great hope had been placed in Milo's death'	[the fact] that x had done in English
relative past in past	past in past in present	"perfect infinitive of periphrastic perfect"	idque ... eius imperātōris nōmine positum ac dēdicātum fuisse (Cicero)	'and (they are saying) that (the statue) had originally been placed there and dedicated in the name of that general (but later Gaius Verres removed it)'	[the fact] that x had done in English
relative past in past	past in past in past	"perfect infinitive of periphrastic perfect"	Herculēs ... dēvēnit ad Promēthea, quem in Caucasō monte vīnctum fuisse suprā dīximus (Hyginus)	'Hercules eventually came to Prometheus, who, as we said above, had earlier been chained up in the Caucasus mountain'	[the fact] that x had earlier done in English
relative past in past	past in past in past	"perfect infinitive of periphrastic perfect"	populum Tanaquil adloquitur: ... sōpītum fuisse rēgem subitō ictū; ... iam ad sē redīsse (Livy)	'Tanaquil addressed the people: she said that the king had earlier been knocked unconscious by the sudden blow, but he had now recovered'	[the fact] that x had earlier done in English
relative past in past	past in past in past	"perfect infinitive of periphrastic perfect"	cognōvī tibi eum falsō suspectum fuisse (Cicero)	'I found out that (until you got to know him better) he had earlier been unfairly suspected by you'	[the fact] that x had earlier done in English

== Tenses in "subjunctive" mode ==
For acts of asking, wondering and hoping, events are represented in the "subjunctive" mode in the reported locutions or ideas. Dependent clauses representing the cause of the dominant clause are also in the "subjunctive" mode. This applies to multiple causal conjunctions such as the causal cum, the causal quī, the final ut/utī, the final nē and the final quī.

Map from basic mode to "infinitive" mode in dependent clauses
Meaning	Basic mode	"Subjunctive" mode	Comment
future in future	ductūrus erō	dūcam	'will lead'
future in present	ductūrus es	dūcam	'will lead'
present in future	dūcere coeperō	dūcam	'will be leading'
present in present	dūcere coepī	dūcam	'is leading'
past in future	dūxerō	dūxerim	'will have led'
past in present	dūxī	dūxerim	'led'
future in past	ductūrus eram	dūcerem	'would lead'
present in past	dūcēbam	dūcerem	'was leading'
past in past	dūxeram	dūxissem	'had led'

=== Secondary tenses ===
==== Secondary future ====
Examples of "subjunctive" dependent clauses - secondary future
Inner Meaning	Outer Meaning	Paradigm	Latin example	English translation	Comment
imperfect in imperfect	future in future	"present subjunctive"	neque quaerēs, ubī nocte dormiat, aut sī quaesieris, prō singulīs injūriīs nūmerābis praesentēs dēnāriōs dūcēnōs. (Petronius)	'you will not ask where he will sleep at night, and if you do, for each harassment you will pay twenty denarii on the spot.'	will do in English
imperfect in imperfect	future in present	"present subjunctive"	oportet ēsse ut vīvās, nōn vīvere ut edās (Rhētorica ad Herennium)	'you should eat to live, not live to eat'	do in English
imperfect in perfect	future in past	"imperfect subjunctive"	Lacedaemoniī lēgātōs Athēnās mīsērunt, quī eum absentem accusārent (Nepos)	'the Spartans sent ambassadors to Athens to accuse him while absent'	do in English

==== Secondary present ====
Examples of "subjunctive" dependent clauses - secondary present
Inner Meaning	Outer Meaning	Paradigm	Latin example	English translation	Comment
imperfect in imperfect	present in future	"present subjunctive"	quaerēs fortāsse, cūr, cum haec in urbe sint, nōn absim, quemadmodum tū. (Cicero)	'[one day] you may ask yourself why, since this will take place in the city, I will not be away [from our city] like you'	will do in English
imperfect in imperfect	present in present	"present subjunctive"	quid tāmen agās, quaerō, et an tuīs pedibus pervēnerīs domum. (Petronius)	'However, I'm asking how you are doing and whether you arrived home on foot.'	am doing in English
imperfect in imperfect	present in present	"present subjunctive"	et forsitan quaeris, quārē sōlus Corinthea vēra possideam. (Petronius)	'and you may be asking why only I own true Corinthean goods.'	do in English
imperfect in imperfect	present in present	"present subjunctive"	quaerunt, ubī sit. (Cicero)	'they are asking where it is.'	do in English
imperfect in imperfect	present in present	"present subjunctive"	velim, vērum sit. (Cicero)	'I hope it is true.'	do in English
imperfect in imperfect	present in present	"present subjunctive"	quae cum ita sint, dubitās, sī... (Cicero)	'since this is the case, you do not know, if you...'	do in English
imperfect in perfect	present in past	"imperfect subjunctive"	quaerēbātur, ubī esset (Cicero)	'people were asking where he was'	did in English

==== Secondary past ====
Examples of "subjunctive" dependent clauses - secondary past
Inner Meaning	Outer Meaning	Paradigm	Latin example	English translation	Comment
perfect in imperfect	past in present	"perfect subjunctive"	mīror, quid causae fuerit quā rē cōnsilium mūtārīs. (Cicero)	'I wonder what the reason was that you changed your plan'	did in English
perfect in imperfect	past in present	"perfect subjunctive"	quid tāmen agās, quaerō, et an tuīs pedibus pervēnerīs domum. (Petronius)	'however, I'm asking how you are doing and whether you arrived home on foot.'	did in English
perfect in imperfect	past in present	"perfect subjunctive"	mē caecum quī haec ante nōn vīderim! (Cicero)	'I must be blind since I didn't see this before!'	did in English
perfect in perfect	past in past	"pluperfect subjunctive"	cum quaererem, num quid nōbīs in prandium frater parāsset... (Petronius)	'when I asked whether my boyfriend had prepared anything for lunch...'	had done in English

=== Tertiary tense ===
==== Tertiary past ====
In "if" clauses within reported locutions, a "present subjunctive" verb can represent a "relative perfect" event at the time of another event, as long as that other event takes place after the time of the reported locution.

Examples of "subjunctive" dependent clauses - tertiary past
Inner Meaning	Outer Meaning	Paradigm	Latin example	English translation	Comment
relative perfect in imperfect	future in future in past	"present subjunctive"	nisī dēcēdat atque exercitum dēdūcat, sēsē illum prō hoste habitūrum (Caesar)	'(Ariovistus told Caesar that,) if he did not retreat and withdraw his army, he would treat him as an enemy'	did in English

=== Expansive meanings ===
==== Tenses in "subjunctive" mode for conditional clauses ====
The following unfulfillable wish also uses the double pluperfect subjunctive passive:

vellem haud correpta fuisset mīlitiā tālī, cōnāta lacessere Teucrōs (Virgil)
'I wish she had never been seized by such love of warfare or attempted to provoke the Trojans!'

Imperfect subjunctive + pluperfect subjunctive:

vellem vērum fuisset (Cicero)
'I wish it had been true'

When the main verb is primary, an imperfect or pluperfect subjunctive in a clause that is already subordinate in the original sentence may often remain:

dīc, quid factūrus fuerīs, sī cēnsor fuissēs? (Livy)
'tell us what you would have done if you had been censor?'

In other examples in reported speech, the subjunctive in the "if" clause represents an original present subjunctive with potential meaning:

voluptātem, sī ipsa prō sē loquātur, concessūram arbitror dignitātī (Cicero)
'I believe that Pleasure, if she were to speak for herself, would give way to Dignity'

In some sentences, the pluperfect subjunctive is a reflection of an original imperfect indicative, as in the following example, where the original verbs would have been mīlitābāmus and habēbāmus:

[dīxit eōs] id tantum dēprecārī, nē īnferiōrēs iīs ordinēs quam quōs cum mīlitāssent habuissent adtribuantur (Livy)
'[he said] that they begged just one favour, that they should be not assigned lower ranks than those which they had held when they were on military service'

In other sentences, the pluperfect subjunctive is a transformation of a future perfect indicative, put into historic sequence. The original words of the following sentence would presumably have been tū, sī aliter fēcerīs, iniūriam Caesarī faciēs 'if you do (will have done) otherwise, you will be doing Caesar a disservice':

eum, sī aliter fēcisset, iniūriam Caesarī factūrum dīxit (Cicero)
'he said that if the man were to do otherwise, he would be doing Caesar a disservice'

in hōc discrīmine lūdōs Iovī, sī fūdisset cecīdissetque hostīs, prōpraetor vōvit (Livy)
'at this critical moment in the battle, the propraetor vowed games to Jupiter, if he routed and slaughtered the enemies'

==== Tenses in "subjunctive" mode for causal clauses ====
Verbs in subordinate clauses in indirect speech are also almost always in the subjunctive mood. This also applies to subordinate clauses when the indirect speech is only implied rather than explicit. Both of the following examples have the perfect subjunctive:

Caesar mihī ignōscit per litterās quod nōn vēnerim (Cicero)
'Caesar is pardoning me by means of a letter for the fact that I didn't come'

mea māter īrāta est quia nōn redierim (Plautus)
'my mother is angry because I didn't return'
