= Latin conditional clauses =

Conditional clauses spoken in Latin

Conditional clauses in Latin are clauses which start with the conjunction sī 'if' or the equivalent. The 'if'-clause in a conditional sentence is known as the protasis, and the consequence is called the apodosis.

Conditional clauses are generally divided into three types: open conditions, when the truth of the condition is unknown ('if it is true that...'); ideal conditions, in which the speaker imagines a situation or event which might occur in the future ('if this were to happen...'); and unreal conditions, referring to an event or situation in the present or past known to be contrary to fact ('if it were true that...'). These three are also sometimes referred to as Type 1, Type 2, and Type 3 respectively. Open conditional clauses in turn can be divided into particular and general.

Open conditional sentences generally use the indicative mood in both protasis and apodosis, although in some general conditions the subjunctive mood is used in the protasis. Ideal and unreal conditionals use the subjunctive in the protasis, and usually they also use the subjunctive in the apodosis, though sometimes the indicative may be used. Conditional clauses of comparison ('as if') also use the subjunctive mood in the protasis.

Conditional clauses sometimes overlap in meaning with other types of clause, such as concessive ('although'), causal ('in view of the fact that'), or temporal ('whenever').

The conjunction sī is only rarely used in classical Latin to introduce indirect questions, although this usage is found in medieval Latin and is common in Greek and in modern Romance languages such as French and Italian. The use of 'if' to make a wish, found in ancient Greek, is not usual in Latin, except sometimes in poetry.

== Main types of conditional clause ==
A summary of the main types of conditional clause is given in the table below. The subjunctive is used in the protasis of ideal and unreal conditions, and also in some types of general conditions. In the apodosis of ideal and unreal conditions, the verb is usually subjunctive, but sometimes the indicative is used.

A difference from English grammar is that in open future conditions, it is usual in Latin to use one of the future tenses, when English has the present tense.

Apart from the types mentioned below it is also possible to have mixed conditionals, for example with different tenses in protasis and apodosis.

Type	Example	Protasis	Apodosis
Real situations
Open (present)	If it is true	present or perfect indicative	present indicative or imperative
Open (past)	If it happened	perfect or imperfect indicative	perfect or imperfect indicative
Open (future)	If it happens (in future)	future or future perfect indicative	future indicative or future imperative
General (present)	If ever it happens	present or perfect indicative (or subjunctive)	present indicative
General (past)	If ever it used to happen	imperfect or pluperfect indicative (or subjunctive)	imperfect indicative
Imaginary situations
Ideal (future)	If it were to happen	present or perfect subjunctive	present subjunctive (or indicative)
Ideal (past)	If it were to have happened	imperfect subjunctive	imperfect subjunctive (or indicative)
Unreal (present)	If it were true now	imperfect subjunctive	imperfect subjunctive (or indicative)
Unreal (past)	If it had happened then	pluperfect or imperfect subjunctive	pluperfect or imperfect subjunctive (or indicative)

== Conditional conjunctions ==
=== Positive conjunctions ===
The usual conjunction in a conditional clause is sī, for which see the examples below.

==== sīn ====
The conjunction sīn 'but if', 'if on the other hand' is used for the second of two opposite conditions:

haec igitur, sī es Rōmae; sīn abes aut etiam sī ades, haec negōtia sīc sē habent (Cicero)
'so this is how it is, if you are at Rome; but if you are away or even if you are there, the business is as I say'

==== sīve ... sīve ====
The pair sīve ... sīve (or Livy's preferred form seu ... seu) 'whether ... or' often does not introduce a full conditional clause and an appropriate verb has to be supplied by the reader:

sīve cāsū sīve cōnsiliō deōrum immortālium (Caesar)
'whether (it happened) by chance or by some plan of the immortal gods'

Sometimes, however, a verb is added:

bella ista, seu falsa seu vēra sunt (Livy)
'those wars of yours, whether they are imaginary or real'

Sometimes the two words can introduce two alternative apodoses, in the same way as sī ... sīn:

seu tū deus es, potes esse Cupīdō; sīve es mortālis, quī tē genuēre beātī (Ovid)
'if you are a god, you may be Cupid; or if you are mortal, blessed are those who bore you'

==== quod sī ====
The combination quod sī 'but if' or 'if, however' can also introduce an alternative:

quod sī maior is tumor est, commodius tōtum excīditur (Celsus)
'if, however, the tumor is a large one, it is better for it to be completely cut out'

==== etsī, etiamsī ====
The combination etsī means 'although', and it is often followed in the apodosis by tamen 'nonetheless':

Datamēs etsī longē aberat ab iīs regiōnibus, tamen rēgis voluntātī mōrem gerendum putāvit (Nepos)
'although Datames was a long way away from that region, yet he thought it best to humour the king's wish'

Another frequent combination, slightly more emphatic, is etiam sī (or etiamsī) 'even if', 'even though':

nec minus līber sum quam vōs, etiam sī pauperem pater mē relīquit (Petronius)
'and I am just no less free than you, even though my father left me poor'

==== siquidem ====
The conjunction siquidem or sī quidem means 'if indeed' or 'if it's true that':

et causa iūsta est, siquidem ita est ut praedicās (Plautus)
'and the cause is a good one, if indeed it is as you claim'

siquidem mēcum fābulārī vīs, subsequere (Plautus)
'if you want to talk to me, follow me'

siquidem pol mē quaeris, adsum praesēns praesentī tibī (Plautus)
'if you're looking for me, here I am, present in your presence'

It also can have a causal meaning, 'in view of the fact that':

obscūra est historia Rōmāna, siquidem istīus rēgis mātrem habēmus, ignōrāmus patrem (Cicero)
'Roman history is obscure, in view of the fact that we know that king's mother, but have no idea who his father was'

==== sī modō ====
Another combination, sī modō 'if indeed', expresses doubt that the situation mentioned is in fact true:

quid sit quod sē ā mē remōvit, sī modō remōvit, ignōrō (Cicero)
'what has caused him to keep away from me, if indeed he has done so, I have no idea'

In other sentences it has the meaning similar to dummodo 'provided that':

facilem esse rem, seu maneant seu proficīscantur, sī modō ūnum omnēs sentiant ac probent (Caesar)
'(he said) there was no difficulty, whether they stayed or marched, provided that they all shared and approved one plan'

Varrō ... inclūdētur in aliquem locum, sī modō erit locus (Cicero)
'Varro ... will be fitted in somewhere provided there is room'

==== sī quis ====
Indefinite conditional clauses often use the combinations sī quis 'if anyone', sī quid 'if anything', sī quī 'if any', sī quisquam 'if anyone at all', sī quicquam 'if anything at all', sī quandō 'if at any time', 'if ever', sī quā 'if in any way':

sī quis quid reddit, magna habenda est grātia (Terence)
'if anyone gives anything back, one should be very grateful'

aut tu, sī qua via est, sī quam tibi dīva creātrīx ostendit ... tēcum mē tolle per undās (Virgil)
'or, if there is any way, if your divine mother has shown you any, take me with you across the waves'

eadem, sī quandō recitō, in proximō discrēta vēlō sedet (Pliny)
'if ever I am reciting, she sits nearby separated by a curtain'

However, it is also possible to use alternative words such as sī aliquis 'if someone', sī unquam 'if ever', and sī ūllus 'if any', which tend to be more emphatic:

quem vidēre, sī ūllō modō potest, pervelim (Cicero)
'whom, if in any way it's possible, I'd love to see'

male mī sit sī umquam quicquam tam ēnītar (Cicero)
'I'll be damned if ever I take so much trouble over anything again!'

dē quō nihil nocuerit sī aliquid cum Balbō eris locūtus (Cicero)
'about which, it won't do any harm if you say something to Balbus'

=== Negative conditions ===
When the conditional clause is negative, there are various possibilities: nisi 'if not', 'unless', sī ... nōn 'if not', nī 'were it not that' and sī minus 'otherwise'.

==== nisi ====
nisi means 'unless' or 'if not' or 'except':

nisi mē frūstrantur,' inquit, 'oculī, māter tibī coniūnxque et līberī adsunt' (Livy)
'unless my eyes are deceiving me,' he said, 'your mother and wife and children are here'

Sometimes nisi and sī are combined:

nōlī putāre mē ad quemquam longiōrēs epistulās scrībere, nisi sī quī ad mē plūra scrīpsit (Cicero)
'don't think that I write longer letters to anyone, except if someone has written more to me'

nisi vērō sī quis est, quī Catilīnae similīs cum Catilīnā sentīre non putet (Cicero)
'unless indeed if there is anyone who doesn't think that people like Catiline have the same views as Catiline'

The above kind of nisi-clause, called 'exceptive nisi', leaves open the possibility that the condition is not met; each of the above examples could be translated 'unless perhaps' or 'unless by chance'. There is another usage of nisi, called 'exclusive nisi', which combined with a negative apodosis gives the logical sense of 'only if':

nōn exīstimāvit suī similibus probārī posse sē esse hostem patriae, nisi mihi esset inimīcus (Cicero)
'he did not think he could prove himself to his peers as an enemy of his fatherland unless he were unfriendly to me'

==== sī ... nōn ====
The combination of sī and nōn is also commonly used:

velim, sī tibī grave nōn erit, certiōrem mē faciās (Cicero)
'I would be grateful, if it's no bother to you, if you would let me know'

eō sī ante eam diem nōn vēnerīs, Rōmae tē fortasse vidēbō (Cicero)
'if you can't get there before that date, perhaps I'll see you in Rome'

The combination sī nōn is preferred when a particular word is made negative:

sī fēcerīs, magnam habēbō grātiam; sī nōn fēcerīs, ignōscam (Cicero)
'if you do it, I will be most grateful; but if you don't, I will forgive you'

==== nī ====
The conjunction nī is less commonly used, except in Livy and the poets. It is not used by Caesar, and only occasionally in Cicero. In the classical writers it is most often used in unreal conditions:

āctumque dē exercitū foret, nī K. Fabius in tempore subsidiō vēnisset (Livy)
'and it would all have been over for the army, if Caeso Fabius had not come just in time to help'

pōns sublicius iter paene hostibus dedit, nī ūnus vir fuisset, Horātius Cocles (Livy)
'the bridge on wooden piles almost gave an entrance to the enemy, had it not been for one man, Horatius Cocles'

Less often nī is used in open conditions:

vāpulābis, nī hīnc abīs (Plautus)
'you'll get a flogging, if you don't go away from here'

==== sī minus ====
Another way of expressing the negative is with sī minus:

epistulam Caesaris mīsī, sī minus lēgissēs (Cicero)
'I have sent you Caesar's letter, in case you had not read it'

sī minus rather than sī nōn is also used if the verb has to be supplied from the context:

ēdūc tēcum omnīs tuōs; sī minus, quam plūrimōs (Cicero)
'take out with you all your friends; failing that, as many as possible'

== Open conditions ==
=== Present or past ===
A present open conditional normally has the indicative in both halves. Various tenses are possible, but the present or perfect are common:

si iam melius valēs, vehementer gaudeō (Cicero)
'if you are in better health now, I am very glad'

sī peccāvī, īnsciēns fēcī (Terence)
'if I did wrong, I did so unwittingly'

sī tū oblītus es, at dī meminērunt, meminit Fidēs (Catullus)
'even if you have forgotten, yet the gods remember; Faithfulness remembers'

The following combines an imperfect tense in the protasis and future in the apodosis:

sī ille exitum nōn reperiēbat, quis nunc reperiet? (Cicero)
'if he was not able to find any way out, who will find one now?'

A conditional clause is often found after quid mīrum 'what is surprising?'

quid mīrum igitur in senibus, sī īnfirmī sunt aliquandō? (Cicero)
'why is it surprising, therefore, if old men are sometimes ill?'

Usually the verb of the apodosis is also indicative, but other moods are possible, such as the imperative below:

"dēsilite", inquit, "mīlitēs, nisi vultis aquilam hostibus prōdere" (Caesar)
'"jump down, soldiers," he said, "unless you wish to betray the eagle to the enemies"'

=== Future ===
In a future conditional, the protasis usually has one of the future tenses, where English has the simple present. In the following, the simple future tense is used:

sī enim erit bellum, cum Pompeiō esse cōnstituī (Cicero)
'if there is (lit. will be) a war, I have decided to be with Pompey'

experiar et dīcam, sī poterō, plānius (Cicero)
'I shall try and explain more clearly, if I can (lit. if I will be able)'

Often, however, a future conditional uses the future perfect indicative, to refer to an event that must take place first before the consequence happens:

haec sī attulerīs, cēnābis bene (Catullus)
'if you bring (lit. will have brought) these things, you will dine well'

egō ad tē, sī quid audierō citius, scrībam. (Cicero)
'if I hear (lit. will have heard) anything sooner, I will write to you'

egō sī ūllō modō potuerō, vel nocturnīs itineribus experiar ut tē videam (Cicero)
'if I can (lit. will have been able) in any way, even if it means travelling at night, I will try to see you'

ferrum in manū est; moriēre, sī ēmīserīs vōcem (Livy)
'there is a sword in my hand; you will die, if you utter (lit. will have uttered) a word!'

Sometimes both halves of the conditional can have the future perfect tense, though this is rare:

sī dīxerō mendācium, solēns meō mōre fēcerō (Plautus)
'if I do tell a lie, I will have done it as I usually do, according to my custom'

If the apodosis of a future conditional is a command, the future imperative (ending in -tō) is used, rather than the present imperative:

tū etiam sī quod scrībās nōn habēbis, scrībitō tamen (Cicero)
'even if you have nothing to write about, write all the same'

The use of the present subjunctive sī possim 'if perhaps I can' in the following example adds uncertainty:

'trānsīre Tiberim' inquit, 'patrēs, et intrāre, sī possim, castra hostium volō' (Livy)
'"I want to cross the Tiber," he said, "senators, and enter the enemies' camp, if perhaps I can"'

Although the future tense is usual in a protasis referring to the future, sometimes, as in English, in colloquial Latin a present tense is used:

sī illum relinquō, eius vītae timeō (Terence)
'if I abandon him, I fear for his life'

== General or iterative conditions ==
=== With the indicative ===
With general or iterative conditions, in writers of the classical period, it was usual to use the indicative mood, as in the following examples:

sī quandō in puerīs ante alter dēns nāscitur quam prior excidat, is quī cadere dēbuit ēvellendus est (Celsus)
'if ever in children a second tooth appears before the earlier one has fallen out, the one which ought to have fallen out must be uprooted'

Sometimes, just as with iterative temporal clauses, a perfect indicative in the protasis is followed by a present indicative in the main clause:

sī pēs condoluit, sī dēns, ferre nōn possumus (Cicero)
'if ever a foot or a tooth has begun to ache, we can't bear it'

In a past context, this becomes sī with the pluperfect indicative:

sī quandō nostrī ferreīs manibus iniectīs nāvem religāverant, undique suīs labōrantibus succurrēbant (Caesar)
'if ever our men by throwing in iron hooks had tied up a ship, the enemy would come running from all sides to help their struggling comrades'

sī ab persequendō hostēs dēterrēre nequīverant, disiectōs circumveniēbant (Sallust)
'if ever they had been unable to deter the enemy from pursuing, they would surround them when they were scattered'

sī tribūnī, sī legiō industriam innocentiamque adprobaverant, retinēbat ōrdinem (Tacitus)
'if the tribunes or legion approved of (a centurion's) industry and innocence, he would retain his rank'

=== With the subjunctive ===
In later writers (but still only rarely in Cicero or Caesar) a protasis with iterative meaning could sometimes use the subjunctive mood:

'chommoda' dīcēbat, sī quandō 'commoda' vellet dīcere (Catullus)
'he used to say "chommoda" if ever he wanted to say "commoda"'

quōrum sī quis ā dominō prehenderētur, cōnsēnsū mīlitum ēripiēbātur (Caesar)
'if ever any of these slaves was seized by his master, he would be rescued by a concerted effort of the soldiers'

=== 2nd person singular generalisation ===
When a generalisation uses the 2nd person singular in a condition, meaning 'one' or 'anyone', the verb is usually in the subjunctive mood even in classical writers:

memoria minuitur, nisi eam exerceās (Cicero)
'memory gets weaker, if you don't exercise it'

standum est in lectō, sī quid dē summō petās (Plautus)
'you need to stand on the bed if you want to get something from on top'

The following similarly uses the perfect subjunctive with the 2nd person:

nūlla est excūsātiō peccātī, sī amīcī causā peccāverīs (Cicero)
'it is no excuse for doing wrong if you have done wrong for the sake of a friend'

The subjunctive is also used in the apodosis of a generalisation if it has a 2nd person singular verb:

sī nōn est, nōlīs esse neque dēsīderēs (Plautus)
'if there isn't one, you don't want there to be one and you don't miss it'

== Ideal conditions ==
=== Ideal conditions (future) ===
Ideal conditions (also known as 'less vivid future conditions' or 'Type II conditions') are those in which the speaker supposes a situation or an event which might occur in future, at least in the imagination. There is generally an assumption on the speaker's part that the event is not going to take place.

==== Subjunctive in the apodosis ====
The tense of an ideal condition is usually present subjunctive, while the main clause usually has the present subjunctive also:

sī vīcīnus tuus equum meliorem habeat quam tuus est, tuumne equum mālīs an illīus? (Cicero)
'supposing your neighbour had a better horse than yours, would you prefer your horse or his?'

haec sī tēcum patria loquātur, nōnne impetrāre dēbeat? (Cicero)
'if your country were to speak with you like this, wouldn't it be right for her to get her wish?'

si quis deus mihī largiātur ut ex hāc aetāte repuerāscam et in cūnīs vāgiam, valdē recūsem (Cicero)
'if some god were to grant me that from this age I should become a child again and cry in the cradle, I would strongly refuse!'

hanc ego viam, iūdicēs, sī asperam atque arduam ... esse negem, mentiar (Cicero)
'if I were to deny that this way is rough and hard, judges, I would be lying.'

The following uses the perfect subjunctive in the protasis:

sī ā corōnā relictus sim, non queam dīcere (Cicero)
'if I were to be deserted by my circle of listeners, I wouldn't be able to speak'

In the following example, the perfect subjunctive in the main clause is used to describe a future potential result:

sī nunc mē suspendam, meīs inimīcīs voluptātem creāverim (Plautus)
'if I were to hang myself now, I would simply have given my enemies pleasure'

The following has the perfect subjunctive in both clauses:

Cicerōnī nēmo ducentōs nunc dederit nummōs, nisi fulserit ānulus ingēns (Juvenal)
'these days (supposing he were to come back to life) no one would give Cicero even two hundred pennies, unless first a huge ring glittered (on Cicero's finger)'

==== Indicative in the apodosis ====
Sometimes, however, the indicative is used in the main clause, as in the following:

sī quis furiōsō praecepta det, erit ipsō quem monēbit, īnsānior (Seneca)
'if anyone were to give advice to a madman, he would be (lit. will be) crazier than the one he is advising'

quid, sī hostēs ad urbem veniant, factūrī estis? (Livy)
'supposing the enemy come to the city, what are you going to do?'

Another phrase using the indicative with potential meaning is longum est, which means 'it would take a long time' or 'it would be tedious'. It is frequently used by Cicero as well as other writers:

longum est omnia ēnumerāre proelia (Nepos)
'it would be tedious to recount all the battles'

=== Past ideal conditionals ===
An ideal condition can occur in a past context also, in which case it uses the imperfect subjunctive. In the following, the apodosis has the imperfect subjunctive:

Caesar sī peteret... nōn quicquam prōficeret (Horace)
'even supposing Caesar himself were to have asked him (to sing), it wouldn't have done any good.'

at tum sī dīcerem, nōn audīrer (Cicero)
'but if I had tried to speak then, I would not have been heard.'

metuēns nē sī cōnsulum iniussū īret, forte dēprehēnsus ā custōdibus Rōmānīs retraherētur, senātum adit (Livy)
'fearing that if he were to go without the permission of the consuls, he might be caught and dragged back by the Roman guards, he approached the senate'

In the following, the verb in the apodosis is imperfect indicative:

neque mūnītiōnēs Caesaris prohibēre poterat, nisī proeliō dēcertāre vellet (Caesar)
'nor was there any way he was able to prevent Caesar's fortifications, unless he wished to fight it out with a battle'

sī lūce palam īrētur, hostis praeventūrus erat (Livy)
'if they went openly in daylight, the enemy was likely to get there first.'

Although conditionals of this kind use sī with the imperfect subjunctive in the same way as an unreal conditional, the meaning is different. In an unreal conditional, the imperfect subjunctive refers to a situation contrary to fact at the present time or at the time of the story, while in a past ideal conditional, the imperfect subjunctive refers prospectively to a situation that might have occurred at a later time than the time of the narrative.

== Unreal conditions ==
=== Present unreal ===
In an unreal or counterfactual conditional sentence the imperfect subjunctive describes a situation contrary to fact in the present and what would follow if that situation were true. The apodosis also usually has the same tense:

ego sī somnum capere possem, tam longīs tē epistulīs nōn obtunderem (Cicero)
'if I could sleep, I wouldn't be bothering you with such long letters'

scrīberem ad tē dē hōc plūra, sī Rōmae essēs (Cicero)
'I would write more to you about this if you were in Rome'

quod egō sī verbō adsequī possem, istōs ipsōs ēicerem quī haec loquuntur (Cicero)
'if I were able to achieve this (i.e. the banishment of Catiline's friends) with a word, I would be banishing those men themselves who are saying this'

Woodcock notes that in early Latin such as Plautus, the present subjunctive rather than the imperfect is often used to represent a present-time counterfactual condition:

haud rogem tē, sī sciam (Plautus)
'I would not be asking you, if I knew.'

tū sī hīc sīs, aliter sentiās (Terence)
'if you were in my place, you would think differently'

In early Latin there is thus a blurring of the distinction between the ideal and the unreal conditional.

=== Past unreal ===
The pluperfect subjunctive, ending in -(i)ssem, represents an event contrary to fact in the past. The same tense is usually used both in the protasis and the apodosis:

sī Rōmae fuissem, tē vīdissem cōramque grātiās ēgissem (Cicero)
'if I had been in Rome, I would have seen you and thanked you in person'

sī occīdisset, rēctē fēcisset: sed nōn occīdit (Quintilian)
'if he had killed him, he would have done so rightly; but he did not kill him'

vōs agitāte fugam: mē sī caelicolae voluissent dūcere vītam, hās mihi servāssent sēdēs (Virgil)
'you flee, if you wish: but as for me, if the gods had wanted me to prolong my life, they would have saved this home for me'

omnium cōnsēnsū capāx imperiī nisī imperāsset (Tacitus)
'by everyone's consent, (Galba would have been seen as) capable of being Emperor, had he never ruled'

When the verb in apodosis is passive, in some authors the imperfect subjunctive esset can be replaced by foret to give a potential meaning to the pluperfect subjunctive:

dēlētusque exercitus foret nī fugientēs silvae texissent (Livy)
'and the army would have been annihilated if the woods hadn't provided cover for those who were fleeing'

obsessaque urbs foret, nī Horātius cōnsul esset revocātus (Livy)
'and the city would have been besieged, if the consul Horatius had not been recalled.'

In other authors, however, the same meaning is expressed using a perfect participle + esset:

quod nisi nox proelium dirēmisset, tōtā classe hostium Caesar potītus esset ([Caesar])
'but if night hadn't interrupted the battle, Caesar would have gained control of the whole enemy fleet'

Sometimes a pluperfect subjunctive is followed by an imperfect or vice versa:

ergō ego nisi peperissem, Rōma nōn oppugnārētur; nisi fīlium habērem, lībera in līberā patriā mortua essem (Livy)
'therefore if I had not given birth, Rome would not now be being attacked; if I did not have a son, I would have died a free woman in a free country'

sī Pergama dextrā dēfendī possent, etiam hāc dēfēnsa fuissent (Virgil)
'if Troy could be defended by anyone's right hand, it would have been defended before now even by this one'

Sometimes an imperfect subjunctive refers to the past rather than the present, and represents a hypothetical situation prevailing at the time of the event described in the apodosis:

neque enim tam facile opēs Carthāginis tantae concidissent nisi illud receptāculum classibus nostrīs patēret (Cicero)
'for the great wealth of Carthage would not have collapsed so easily, if that refuge had not been available to our fleets at the time'

hic sī mentis esset suae, ausus esset ēdūcere exercitum? (Cicero)
'if this man had been in his right mind, would he have dared to lead out an army?'

Sometimes in poetry, an unreal conditional uses the present or perfect subjunctive as if it were an ideal conditional:

nī mea cūra resistat, iam flammae tulerint (Virgil)
'had my care not stood in the way, flames would already have carried them off.'

nī docta comes admoneat ... inruat, et frūstrā ferrō dīverberet umbrās (Virgil)
'and if his learned companion had not warned him, he would have rushed in and vainly beaten away the shadows with his sword'

An imperfect subjunctive can sometimes be used in poetry with a similar meaning:

quīn prōtinus omnia perlegerent oculīs, nī iam praemissus Achātes adforet (Virgil)
'indeed they would have continued examining everything carefully with their eyes, had it not been that Achates, who had been sent ahead, was now present'

=== Indicative in the apodosis ===
Although most unreal conditionals have the subjunctive in the apodosis, it is also possible, just as with ideal conditions, sometimes to use the indicative, especially if the verb is one of possibility or obligation:

neque sustinērī poterant, nī extraōrdināriae cohortēs sē obiēcissent (Livy)
'and they could not have been withstood, if the reserved cohorts had not thrown themselves in the way'

nisi fēlicitās in sōcordiam vertisset, exuere iugam potuēre (Tacitus)
'if their success hadn't turned into laziness, they might well have thrown off the yoke'

Antōnī gladiōs potuit contemnere, sī sīc omnia dīxisset (Juvenal)
'(Cicero) would have been able to despise Antony's swords, if he had said everything as badly as this'

sī ūnum diem morātī essētis, moriendum omnibus fuit (Livy)
'if you had delayed for a single day, you must certainly have all died.'

quod sī ita putāsset, certē optābilius Milōnī fuit dare iugulum P. Clōdiō (Cicero)
'but if he had thought like this, it would certainly have been preferable for Milo to offer his throat to Publius Clodius'

The imperfect indicative is used for actions that were interrupted. The protasis is usually negative:

lābēbar longius, nisi mē retinuissem (Cicero)
'I was about to fall further into error, if I had not held myself back'

in amplexūs occurrentis fīliae ruēbat, nisi interiectī lictōres utrīsque obstitissent (Tacitus)
'he was rushing into the embrace of his daughter who was running towards him, (and they would have hugged) if the bodyguards had not intervened and stood in the way of them both'

Caecīna dēlāpsus circumveniēbātur, nī prīma legiō sēsē opposuisset (Tacitus)
'Caecina had fallen and was about to be surrounded, if the first legion hadn't put themselves in the way'

The perfect indicative with paene 'almost' indicates an event that nearly took place:

pōns sublicius iter paene hostibus dedit, nī ūnus vir fuisset, Horātius Cocles. (Livy)
'the wooden bridge almost gave the enemy a means of entry, had it not been for one man, Horatius Cocles.'

The pluperfect indicative is sometimes used for events that looked almost certain to happen:

nisi Latīnī arma sūmpsissent, captī et dēletī erāmus (Livy)
'if the Latins had not taken up arms, we would certainly have been captured and wiped out.'

perāctum erat bellum, sī Pompeium Brundisiī opprimere potuisset (Florus)
'the war would have been over immediately, if he had managed to crush Pompey in Brundisium.'

In later, post-classical Latin, it became regular for the indicative to be used in the apodosis of an unreal conditional, as in this example from Gregory of Tours (6th century A.D.):

sī fās fuisset, angelum dē caelō ēvocāveram (Gregory of Tours)
'if it had been allowable, I would have called an angel from heaven'

== Conditional clauses of comparison ==
Expressions such as tamquam sī 'as if', aequē ac sī 'equally as if', perinde ac sī, proinde ac sī, pariter ac sī 'in the same way as if', velut sī, tamquam 'as though' introduce conditional clauses of comparison. As with ideal and unreal conditions, the verb in the conditional clause is usually in the subjunctive mood. However, the tenses differ from ordinary ideal and unreal conditionals. The main verb is usually either indicative or imperative, and the subordinate clause follows the tense of this according to the sequence of tenses rule. Thus the present subjunctive is usual if the main verb is in the present tense:

tamquam sī claudus sim est ambulandum (Plautus)
'I must walk as if I were lame'

nōlī timēre quasi assem elephantō dēs (Quintilian)
'don't be nervous as if you were giving a penny to an elephant'

hīc est obstandum, mīlitēs, velut sī ante Rōmāna moenia pugnēmus (Livy)
'here we must make a stand, soldiers, just as if we were fighting before the walls of Rome'

The perfect subjunctive can be used to refer to an imaginary past situation in a primary-context sentence:

mē iuvat, velut ipse in parte labōris ac perīculī fuerim, ad fīnem bellī Pūnicī pervēnisse (Livy)
'I am as delighted to have reached the end of the Punic War as I would be if I had been part of the struggle and danger myself'

The following example is exceptional in that the imperfect subjunctive is used in the 'as if' clause, even though the main verb is primary:

Egnātī absentis rem ut tueāre aequē ā tē petō ac sī mea negōtia essent velim (Cicero)
'I should like you to watch over Egnatius's interests while he is away just as if they were my business'

When the main verb is perfect or pluperfect, the verb in the conditional clause is imperfect subjunctive, if it imagines a situation coinciding in time with the main verb:

tantus metus patrēs cēpit velut sī iam ad portās hostis esset (Livy)
'fear overcame the senators as great as if the enemy were already at the gates'

The pluperfect subjunctive is used for an imagined event preceding the time of main verb in a historic context:

velut sī prōlāpsus cecidisset, terram ōsculō contigit (Livy)
'as if he had tripped and fallen, he touched the earth with a kiss'

dēlēta est Ausonum gēns perinde ac sī internecīvō bellō certāsset (Livy)
'the race of Ausonians was wiped out just as surely as if they had fought in a war to the death'

== 'If by chance' or 'in case' ==
A common idiom in Latin is for a conditional clause, especially one starting sī forte 'if by chance', to mean 'to see if by chance' or 'on the off chance that'. This is common in contexts such as 'go to see if', 'try to see if' and 'wait to see if':

In the following example, the present indicative is used:

ībō et vīsam hūc ad eum, sī forte est domī (Plautus)
'I'll go and visit him here, if by chance he's at home'

However, in most such sentences, since there is some idea of purpose, the subjunctive mood is used. The following uses the present subjunctive, since it follows a present tense verb:

ille extemplō servolum iubet illum eundem persequī, sī quā queāt reperīre quae sustulerit (Plautus)
'he immediately orders that same servant to make enquiries, (to see) if in any way he may be able to find the woman who picked up (the baby)'

The following use the imperfect subjunctive, since the context is historic:

hanc (palūdem) sī nostrī trānsīrent hostēs expectābant (Caesar)
'the enemy were waiting (to see) if our men would cross this (marsh)'

pergit ad proximam spēluncam, sī forte eō vestīgia ferrent (Livy)
'he headed for the nearest cave (to see) if perhaps footprints led there'

nōn recūsāvit quō minus vel extrēmō spīritū, sī quam opem rēī pūblicae ferre posset, experīrētur (Cicero)
'he did not refuse even with his last breath to try (to see) if he could bring some help to the republic'

The word sī in conditionals of this kind can also be translated 'in case':

is in armīs mīlitēs tenuit, sī opus foret auxiliō (Livy)
'he kept the soldiers in arms, in case there might later be need for help'

In the following epistolary tenses are used, so that the subjunctive is pluperfect rather than perfect:

epistulam Caesaris mīsī, sī minus lēgisses (Cicero)
'I have sent you Caesar's letter, in case you haven't read it'

== Wishes ==
The use of sī in wishes is rare in Latin, since the usual particle introducing a wish is utinam. However, occasionally in poetry a wish may be expressed with ō sī... followed by a subjunctive mood verb. The construction is described by Gildersleeve & Lodge as 'poetical and very rare':

ō mihi praeteritōs referat sī Iuppiter annōs! (Virgil)
'o, if only Jupiter would bring back for me the years which have passed!'

ō, sī solitae quicquam virtūtis adesset! (Virgil)
'o, if only something of our former courage were here!'

== Conditionals in indirect speech ==
=== Indirect present and future conditions ===
Subordinate clauses in indirect speech usually use the subjunctive mood. However, if the introductory verb is 1st or 2nd person, the indicative is sometimes retained in a conditional clause, as in the following example:

spērō, sī absolūtus erit, coniūnctiōrem illum nōbīs fore in ratiōne petītiōnis (Cicero)
'I hope that if (Catiline) is acquitted, he will work more closely with me in my election campaign'

Otherwise the verb in the protasis becomes subjunctive, as in the following:

sī adīre non possit, monet ut trāgulam cum epistolā ad āmentum dēligatā intrā munītiōnem castrōrum abiciat (Caesar)
'he advises him that, if he can't approach, he should throw a javelin inside the walls of the camp with the letter attached to the strap'

sī pāce ūtī velint, inīquum esse dē stīpendiō recūsāre (Caesar)
'(he said that) if they wished for peace, it was unfair to refuse to pay tribute'

The verbs in the above sentences are present subjunctive, despite the historic context, by a process called repraesentātiō, which makes the situation more vivid.

If the verb in an apodosis is a future perfect tense in direct speech, it cannot be expressed using an active verb, but it is possible to use or deponent or passive perfect participle with fore:

hoc possum dīcere, mē satis adeptum fore, sī nūllum in mē perīculum redundārit (Cicero)
'I can say this, that I will have achieved enough, if no danger redounds on me'

When the context is past, a future perfect tense in the protasis usually becomes a pluperfect subjunctive:

futūrum esse, nisī prōvīsum esset, ut Rōma caperētur (Cicero)
'(the voice said) that, unless some precaution was taken, Rome would be captured'

monuit Crassum quid ēventūrum esset, nisi cāvisset (Cicero)
'he warned Crassus what was likely to happen, if he wasn't careful'

templum Iovī Statōri vovet, sī cōnstitisset ā fugā Rōmāna aciēs (Livy)
'(Regulus) vowed a temple to Jupiter the Stayer, if the Roman battle-line stopped fleeing'

prōnūntiat Gracchus esse nihil quod dē lībertāte spērārent, nisi eō diē fūsī fugātīque hostēs essent (Livy)
'Gracchus proclaimed that they had no hope at all of liberty unless the enemy were routed and put to flight on that day'

However, again by repraesentātiō, the perfect subjunctive is used in the protasis below even in a past context, as if it followed a present tense verb:

haec sī Ariovistō nūntiāta sint, nōn dubitāre quīn dē omnibus supplicium sūmat (Caesar)
'they said that if these things were reported to Ariovistus, they did not doubt that he would punish them all'

In the following sentence, instead of a pluperfect subjunctive, the imperfect subjunctive restituerētur is used with a prospective or future meaning:

nec, sī illa restituerētur, dubitāvī quīn mē sēcum redūceret (Cicero)
'and I didn't doubt that, if the republican government were restored, it would bring me back with it'

The subjunctive foret (derived from the future infinitive fore), can sometimes be used in the protasis instead of esset to refer to a future situation in indirect speech (see Latin tenses#Foret):

usūrum sē eōrum operā sī bellum cum Veientibus foret (Livy)
'(he said that) he would use their help if ever one day there was a war with the people of Veii'

sī summus foret, futūrum brevem (Cicero)
'(he was confident) that even if (the pain) were going to be very great, it would be brief'

Combined with a perfect or deponent participle, foret can stand in a protasis for a future perfect tense of direct speech:

cōnsulātum petēbat spērāns, sī dēsignātus foret, facile sē ex voluntāte Antōniō ūsūrum (Sallust)
'he was seeking the consulship, hoping that if he should be elected he would easily manage Antony according to his pleasure'

timor inde patrēs incessit nē, sī dīmissus exercitus foret, rūrsus coetūs occultī coniūratiōnēsque fīerent (Livy)
'the senators then became afraid that, if the army was dismissed, once again secret gatherings and conspiracies might take place'

quasi polluī cōnsulātum crēdēbant, sī eum quamvīs ēgregius homō novus adeptus foret (Sallust)
'they believed that the consulate would be almost polluted, if a new man, however, talented, were to have obtained it'

=== Indirect ideal conditions ===
Since in indirect speech the subjunctive is usually used in a subordinate clause, the distinction between the ideal conditional and the simple future conditional disappears. In the following examples, only the context indicates that the conditional is ideal:

ait sē sī ūrātur 'quam hoc suāve!' dictūrum (Cicero)
'he says that if he were to be being burnt, he would say "how pleasant this is!"'

The perfect subjunctive can also be used if the context is present:

quem adhūc nōs quidem vīdimus nēminem; sed philosophōrum sententiīs, quālis hic futūrus sit, sī modō aliquandō fuerit, expōnitur (Cicero)
'we ourselves have never seen such a (perfectly wise) man; but it is explained in the opinions of philosophers what such a person would be like, if one were ever to exist'

As mentioned above, the perfect participle with fore represents a future perfect passive in the main clause:

metum sī quī sūstulisset, omnem vītae dīligentiam sublātam fore (Cicero)
'(the philosophers say that) if someone removed fear, all carefulness of living would have been removed too'

=== Indirect unreal conditions (present) ===
If a conditional clause in indirect speech describes a present situation contrary to fact, the verb in the apodosis is the periphrastic perfect infinitive, consisting of a future participle + fuisse (e.g. factūrum fuisse). The imperfect subjunctive in the protasis remains unchanged, even after a primary tense verb:

quid censēs? sī ratiō esset in bēluīs, nōn suō quāsque generī plūrimum tribūtūrās fuisse? (Cicero)
'what do you think? do you not think that if reason existed in wild beasts, each kind would not attribute most to its own kind?'

fatentur sē virtūtis causā, nisi ea voluptātem faceret, nē manum quidem versūrōs fuisse (Cicero)
'they confess that they would not even lift a hand for the sake of virtue, unless virtue itself gave pleasure'

an tū cēnsēs ūllam anum tam dēlīram futūram fuisse ut somniīs crēderet, nisī ista cāsū nōn nunquam forte temerē concurrerent? (Cicero)
'do you think any old woman would be so crazy as to believe in dreams if those dreams didn't come true by chance sometimes?'

quid putāmus passūrum fuisse sī vīveret? – nobīscum cēnāret! (Pliny)
'what do we think would be happening to him if he were alive?' – 'he would be dining with us!'

In the following, a present unreal situation follows from an unreal past condition:

stīpendium scītōte pependisse sociōs vestrōs Gallīs, et nunc fuisse pēnsūrōs, sī ā mē foret cessātum (Livy)
'be aware that your allies used to pay tribute to the Gauls, and they would still be paying now, if my efforts had been slackened'

If the apodosis is an indirect question, the future participle is combined with the perfect subjunctive fuerit instead of the perfect infinitive fuisse:

cōgitā quantum additūrus celeritātī fuerīs, sī ā tergō hostis īnstāret! (Seneca)
'think how much extra speed you would put on, if an enemy were pursuing you from behind!'

=== Indirect unreal conditions (past) ===
In an indirect past unreal conditional, the apodosis is also often expressed using the future participle plus fuisse, exactly as a present unreal conditional:

nōn vidētur mentītūrus fuisse, nisī dēspērāsset (Quintilian)
'it is unlikely that he would have told a lie unless he had been desperate'

hoc tamen nūntiā, melius mē moritūram fuisse sī nōn in fūnere meō nūpsissem (Livy)
'but take this message to him, that I would have died better if I had not married on the day of my funeral!'

facturum enim se fuisse dixit ut duorum patriciorum nomina reciperet, si alium quam se consulem fieri uideret (Livy)
'for he said that he would have agreed to accept the names of two patricians, if he could see anyone other than himself becoming consul'

When the indirect speech is an indirect question, or a quīn clause, rather than an indirect statement, the construction in the apodosis is the same, except that the perfect infinitive fuisse is replaced by the perfect subjunctive fuerit:

dīc agedum, Appī Claudī, quidnam factūrus fuerīs, sī eō tempore cēnsor fuissēs? (Livy)
'tell us, Appius Claudius, what you would have done if you had been censor at that time?'

When the verb is passive, futūrum fuisse ut can occasionally be used. However, this is very rare, and only two instances have been noted:

nisi eō ipsō tempore quīdam nūntiī dē Caesaris victōriā essent allātī, exīstimābant plērīque futūrum fuisse utī āmitterētur (Caesar)
'if at that very moment certain reports had not arrived bringing news of Caesar's victory, most people reckoned that the town would have been lost'

Another way of expressing a passive verb in the apodosis of an unreal conditional in indirect speech is to use the perfect infinitive of possum combined with a present passive infinitive; that is, to write 'could have been done' instead of 'would have been done', since the two are close in meaning:

at plerīque exīstimant, sī ācrius īnsequī voluisset, bellum eō diē potuisse fīnīrī (Caesar)
'but most people think that if he had been prepared to follow up the pursuit more vigorously, the war could have been finished on that day'

Similarly in an indirect question, the perfect subjunctive potuerit with the present infinitive can be used:

quaeris quid potuerit amplius adsequī Plancius, sī Cn. Scīpionis fuisset fīlius (Cicero)
'you ask what more Plancius could/would have achieved, if he had been the son of Gnaeus Scipio'

Another possibility, when the main verb in a quīn-clause is passive, is for the tense to be unchanged from direct speech. Thus in the following, the pluperfect subjunctive is retained:

id ille sī repudiāsset, dubitātis quīn eī vīs esset allāta? (Cicero)
'if he had rejected that, do you doubt that violence would have been done to him?'

Even after a historic introductory verb, the perfect subjunctive is usually still retained in a quīn clause (contrary to the usual sequence of tenses rule):

nec dubium erat quīn, sī tam paucī simul obīre omnia possent, terga datūrī hostēs fuerint (Livy)
'nor was there any doubt that if it were possible for so few to manage everything at once, the enemy would have turned their backs'

Exactly the same sequence of tenses is used if the conditional sentence is part of a consecutive clause instead of a quī-clause:

ea rēs tantum tumultum et fugam praebuit ut nisi castra Pūnica extrā urbem fuissent, effūsūra sē omnis pavida multitūdō fuerit (Livy)
'that situation caused so much panic that if the Carthaginian camp hadn't been situated outside the city, all the frightened mob would have poured out'

Similarly the perfect subjunctive potuerit, not the pluperfect potuisset, is also usually used even after an historic-tense introductory verb to express a passive verb:

haud dubium erat quīn, nisi ea mora intervēnisset, castra eō diē Pūnica capī potuerint (Livy)
'there was no doubt that if the delay had not intervened, the Carthaginian camp could/would have been captured that day'

Occasionally, however, after a historic verb the pluperfect subjunctive fuisset is used, but this is rare, and found only in Livy:

subībat cōgitātiō animum quōnam modō tolerābilis futūra Etrūria fuisset, sī quid in Samniō adversī ēvēnisset (Livy)
'it occurred to them how impossible Etruria would have been, if anything had gone wrong in Samnium'

The following example is unusual in that it envisages a future event that might one day have taken place if a past situation had been different. The tense used in the apodosis is the imperfect subjunctive:

sī tum P. Sestius animam ēdidisset, nōn dubitō quīn aliquandō statua huic in forō statuerētur (Cicero)
'if at that time Publius Sestius had died, I do not doubt that one day a statue would be set up to this man in the forum'

=== Indirect questions with sī ===
In classical Latin, indirect questions are almost never introduced by sī. Instead, after the verb quaerō 'I ask', the simple suffix -ne is usually used:

quaesīvī cognōsceretne signum; adnuit (Cicero)
'I asked if he recognised the seal; he nodded'

However, Livy sometimes uses sī:

nihil aliud locūtum ferunt quam quaesīsse, sī incolumis Lycortās equitēsque ēvāsissent (Livy)
'it is reported that he said nothing else except to ask if Lycortas and the cavalrymen had escaped unharmed'

According to Lewis and Short's dictionary, this usage derives from the meaning 'to see if by chance' described above. A sentence where this meaning after quaerō is more evident is the following:

quaero diū tōtam per urbem, sī qua puella neget: nulla puella negat (Martial)
'I have been searching for a long time through the whole city (to see) if any girl will say no; not one says no'

Another place where 'if' is used in modern languages is in expressions such as 'I don't know if ...'. However, in classical Latin after nesciō or haud sciō 'I do not know', it is usual to use the particle an:

nōn possum scīre, an eī prōfutūrus sim, quem admoneō (Seneca)
'I have no way of knowing if I am going to be of benefit to the person I am advising'

The use of sī in such sentences is very rare, although the following is cited:

sed fātīs incerta feror, sī Iuppiter ūnam esse velit Tyriīs urbem Troiāque profectīs (Virgil)
'but I am being tossed by the Fates, uncertain whether Jupiter wishes there to be one city for the Tyrians and the refugees from Troy'

The use of sī in both types of sentence is recorded in medieval Latin, however.

== Conditional clause equivalents ==
Occasionally conditional clauses can be made without a conjunction. An imperative is sometimes used:

rēs age, tūtus eris (Ovid)
'keep busy (and) you will be safe'

rem tenē, verba sequentur (Cato)
'hold the subject matter, the words will follow'

Sometimes ac 'and' is added, or (from the time of Virgil onwards) et:

perge ac facile ecfēceris (Plautus)
'go ahead, and you will easily carry it through'

dīc . . . et eris mihi magnus Apollō (Virgil)
'tell me and to me you will be great Apollo'

Sometimes the word sī 'if' or etiamsī 'even if' is simply omitted, usually with a subjunctive verb:

fīliam quis habet, pecūniā est opus (Cicero)
'(if) someone has a daughter, he needs money'

dedissēs huic animō pār corpus, fēcisset quod optābat (Pliny the Younger)
'had you given this man a body equal to his spirit, he would have done what he desired'

nātūram expellās furcā, tamen ūsque recurret (Horace)
'(even if) you expel nature with a pitchfork, nonetheless it will keep coming back'

Another possibility is a participle phrase:

nihil (potest) ēvenīre nisī causā antecēdente (Cicero)
'nothing can occur unless there is some preceding cause'

quā ratiōne sublātā omnis contrōversia quoque sublāta sit (Cicero)
'if this reason were to be removed, the whole basis of the case would also have been removed'

In other sentences a conditional is implied in an adjectival phrase:

bene nōn poterat sine pūrō pectore vīvī (Lucretius)
'life could not be lived well without a pure heart'

== Bibliography ==
- Bertocchi, Alessandra; Maraldi, Mirka (2011). "Conditionals and concessives". In: Baldi, Philip; Cuzzolin, Pierluigi.New perspectives on historical Latin syntax. Volume 4, Complex sentences, grammaticalization, typology, chapter 4. de Gruyter, pp. 93–193.
- Gildersleeve, B. L. & Gonzalez Lodge (1895). Gildersleeve's Latin Grammar. 3rd Edition. (Macmillan)
- Greenough, J. B. et al. (1903). Allen and Greenough's New Latin Grammar for Schools and Colleges. Boston and London.
- Kennedy, Benjamin Hall (1871). The Revised Latin Primer. Edited and further revised by Sir James Mountford, Longman 1930; reprinted 1962.
- Salmon, E. T. (1931). "A Note on Subordinate Clauses in Oratio Obliqua". The Classical Review, Vol. 45, No. 5 (Nov., 1931), p. 173.
- Terrell, Glanville (1904). "The Apodosis of the Unreal Condition in Oratio Obliqua in Latin". The American Journal of Philology, Vol. 25, No. 1 (1904), pp. 59–73.
- Woodcock, E.C. (1959), A New Latin Syntax.

== See also ==
- Ancient Greek conditional clauses
- Conditional sentence
- Counterfactual conditional
