= Ancient Greek conditional clauses =

Part of grammar in ancient Greek

Conditional clauses in Ancient Greek are clauses which start with εἰ (ei) "if" or ἐάν (eān) "if (it may be)". ἐάν (eān) can be contracted to ἤν (ḗn) or ἄν (ā́n), with a long vowel. The "if"-clause of a conditional sentence is called the protasis, and the consequent or main clause is called the apodosis.

The negative particle in a conditional clause is usually μή (mḗ), making the conjunctions εἰ μή (ei mḗ) or ἐὰν μή (eàn mḗ) "unless", "if not". However, some conditions have οὐ (ou). The apodosis usually has οὐ (ou).

A conditional clause preceded by εἴθε (eíthe) or εἰ γάρ (ei gár) "if only" is also occasionally used in Greek for making a wish. The conjunction εἰ (ei) "if" also frequently introduces an indirect question.

== Classification of conditional clauses ==
Conditional clauses are classified into a small number of different types, as shown on the table below.

Grammatically, there is no difference between a present general condition ("if ever it happens") and a vivid future ("if it happens"), both having ἐάν (eán) with the subjunctive. Similarly there is no difference between a past general condition ("if ever it happened") and a less vivid future condition ("if it were to happen"), both having εἰ (ei) with the optative. In this case, only the apodosis will distinguish which type of clause it is.

Those conditions which imagine a purely hypothetical situation (for example, "if I were to die", "if I was dead", "if I had died") usually have the particle ἄν (án) in the apodosis. However, ἄν (án) can sometimes be omitted, for example if the apodosis has an imperfect tense verb such as ἔδει (édei) "it was necessary" or ἐξῆν (exên) "it was possible".

Type	Example	Protasis	Apodosis
Primary tenses
Simple (open)	If it is true	εἰ + present or perfect indicative	indicative or imperative
Emotional future	If it happens (in future)	εἰ + future indicative	future indicative
Vivid future	If it happens (in future)	ἐάν + subjunctive	future indicative
General present	If ever it happens	ἐάν + subjunctive	present indicative
Historic tenses
Simple (open)	If it was true	εἰ + imperfect or aorist indicative	indicative
General past	If ever it used to happen	εἰ + optative	imperfect indicative
Less vivid future	If it were to happen	εἰ + optative	optative + ἄν
Unreal present	If it were true	εἰ + imperfect indicative	imperfect indicative + ἄν
Unreal past	If it had happened	εἰ + aorist indicative	aorist indicative + ἄν

== Simple (open) conditions ==
A simple condition uses the indicative in the protasis. The apodosis can have an imperative:

εἰ δέ τις ἄλλο ὁρᾷ βέλτιον, λεξάτω. (Xenophon)
ei dé tis állo horâi béltion, lexátō.
"if anyone sees anything better, let him say so."

εἰ βούλει, μένε ἐπὶ τῷ στρατεύματι. (Xenophon)
ei boúlei, méne epì tôi strateúmati.
"if you want to, stay with the army."

εἰ οὖν βούλεσθε, ἔξεστιν ὑμῖν ἡμᾶς λαβεῖν ξυμμάχους. (Xenophon)
ei oûn boúlesthe, éxestin humîn hēmâs labeîn xummákhous.
"if you want, it is possible for you to take us as allies."

A simple conditional may use any tense of the indicative. The following has the perfect indicative:

εἰ μέν τι ἠσέβηκα ... ἀποκτείνατέ με. (Andocides)
ei mén ti ēsébēka ... apokteínaté me.
"if I have committed any sacrilege, put me to death."

The following uses the imperfect indicative in both clauses:

εἰ ἐν ἐκείνῃ τῇ νυκτὶ ἐγὼ ἐπεβούλευον Ἐρατοσθένει, πότερον ἦν μοι κρεῖττον αὐτῷ ἑτέρωθι δειπνεῖν ἢ τὸν συνδειπνήσοντά μοι εἰσαγαγεῖν; (Lysias)
ei en ekeínēi têi nuktì egṑ epeboúleuon Eratosthénei, póteron ên moi kreîtton autôi hetérōthi deipneîn ḕ tòn sundeipnḗsontá moi eisagageîn?
"if on that night I was plotting against Eratosthenes, was it better for me to dine elsewhere or to bring that guest to my house?"

The following uses the aorist indicative followed by an aorist imperative:

εἰ ἤκουσάς τι τούτου τοῦ πράγματος τοῦ γενομένου, εἰπέ. (Andocides)
ei ḗkousás ti toútou toû prágmatos toû genoménou, eipé.
"if you heard anything about this matter which has happened, tell us."

The following, from Euripides' play Electra, has two aorist indicative tenses:

εἰ δʼ, ὡς λέγεις, σὴν θυγατέρʼ ἔκτεινεν πατήρ,
ἐγὼ τί σʼ ἠδίκησʼ ἐμός τε σύγγονος; (Euripides)
ei dʼ, hōs légeis, sḕn thugatérʼ ékteinen patḗr,
egṑ tí sʼ ēdíkēsʼ emós te súngonos?
"even if, as you say, our father killed your daughter,
how did I or my brother wrong you?"

== Future conditions ==
=== "Emotional" future conditions ===
In an open conditional the tense of the protasis can be future indicative. According to Smyth, this kind of vivid future conditional is used when the protasis expresses strong feeling: "the apodosis commonly conveys a threat, a warning, or an earnest appeal to the feelings". He refers to it as the "emotional future" conditional.

In the following, a present tense apodosis is combined with a future protasis:

οὐκ ἔστι παρελθεῖν, εἰ μὴ τούτους ἀποκόψομεν. (Xenophon)
ouk ésti pareltheîn, ei mḕ toútous apokópsomen.
'it's impossible to go past, unless we first cut down these men.'

τῇ γὰρ στρατιᾷ οὐκ ἔστι τὰ ἐπιτήδεια, εἰ μὴ ληψόμεθα τὸ χωρίον. (Xenophon)
têi gàr stratiâi ouk ésti tà epitḗdeia, ei mḕ lēpsómetha tò khōríon.
"there is no food for the army, unless we capture the fort."

In the following poetic example, the protasis has a future indicative as before, but in the apodosis instead of a future, there is an aorist indicative:

ἀπωλόμην ἄρ᾽, εἴ με δὴ λείψεις, γύναι. (Euripides)
apōlómēn ár᾽, eí me dḕ leípseis, gúnai.
"I am undone if you leave me, wife!"

=== Vivid future conditions ===
A conditional clause referring to the future usually uses the conjunction ἐάν (eán), which can be shortened to ἤν or ἄν (ḗn, ā́n) "if (by chance)" followed by the subjunctive mood. (The second vowel of ἐάν (eán) is long, as appears from examples in Sophocles and Aristophanes.)

Conditional sentences of this kind are referred to by Smyth as the "more vivid" future conditions, and are very common. In the following examples, the protasis has the present subjunctive, and the apodosis has the future indicative:

ἥξω παρὰ σὲ αὔριον, ἐὰν θεὸς ἐθέλῃ. (Plato)
hḗxō parà sè aúrion, eàn theòs ethélēi.
"I will come to see you tomorrow, if God is willing."

ἢν μὲν ἀνάγκη ᾖ, πολεμήσομεν. (Xenophon)
ḕn mèn anánkē êi, polemḗsomen.
"if it's necessary, we shall make war."

ἐὰν ζητῇς καλῶς, εὑρήσεις. (Plato)
eàn zētêis kalôs, heurḗseis.
"if you seek well, you will find."

ἐὰν μὲν γὰρ τὰ δίκαια λέγῃς, οἱ ἄνθρωποί σε μισήσουσιν, ἐὰν δὲ τὰ ἄδικα, οἱ θεοί. (Aristotle)
eàn mèn gàr tà díkaia légēis, hoi ánthrōpoí se misḗsousin, eàn dè tà ádika, hoi theoí.
'for if you say just things, people will hate you; if you say unjust things, the gods will.'

The apodosis can contain a present tense, if the verb is δεῖ (deî) "it is necessary":

τὸ γὰρ αὔτʼ, ἐὰν ἡττᾶσθε, καὶ σφὼ δεῖ παθεῖν. (Aristophanes)
tò gàr aútʼ, eàn hēttâsthe, kaì sphṑ deî patheîn.
"you two must suffer the same penalty too, if you are defeated"

The negative used in a conditional clause is usually μή (mḗ):

ἢν μὴ ’θέλωσι, ἀναγκάσουσιν. (Thucydides)
ḕn mḕ ’thélōsi, anankásousin.
"if they are not willing, they will force them."

ἐὰν γὰρ μὴ ὁμολογῇς, μάρτυρας παρέξομαι. (Plato)
eàn gàr mḕ homologêis, márturas paréxomai.
"if you don't agree, I will produce witnesses."

However, sometimes the negative οὐ (ou) is used, for example, when οὔ φημι (oú phēmi) has the force of a single word "deny":

ἐάντε σὺ καὶ Ἄνυτος οὐ φῆτε ἐάντε φῆτε (Plato)
eánte sù kaì Ánutos ou phête eánte phête
"whether you and Anytos deny it or agree with it"

In the following example, the aorist subjunctive is used in the protasis, to indicate that the action of capturing the hill must be done first before the enemy can be dislodged:

ἢν γὰρ τοῦτο λάβωμεν, οὐ δυνήσονται μένειν οἱ ὑπὲρ τῆς ὁδοῦ. (Xenophon)
ḕn gàr toûto lábōmen, ou dunḗsontai ménein hoi hupèr tês hodoû.
"if we can first capture that (hill), the men threatening the road will not be able to remain."

=== Less vivid future conditions ===
The "less vivid" future (or "ideal") conditional describes a hypothetical situation in the future. There is often an implication that the speaker does not expect the situation to actually happen. The optative mood is used in both halves of the sentence, with the particle ἄν (án) added before or after the verb in the apodosis.

The tense of the verb can be aorist (if it is an event) or present (if it describes a situation). The following three examples use the aorist optative:

καὶ ὁ Παρθένιος ἄβατος· ἐφʼ ὃν ἔλθοιτε ἄν, εἰ τὸν Ἅλυν διαβαίητε. (Xenophon)
kaì ho Parthénios ábatos; ephʼ hòn élthoite án, ei tòn Hálun diabaíēte.
"the Parthenios river also cannot be crossed, to which you would come if you crossed the Halys."

οὐδέν γε ἄτοπον εἰ ἀποθάνοιμι. (Plato)
oudén ge átopon ei apothánoimi..
"there would be nothing strange about it if I were to die."

εἰ δή τις με ἔροιτο ὑμῶν ... εἴποιμʼ ἄν ... (Aeschines)
ei dḗ tis me éroito humôn ... eípoimʼ án ...
"if one of you were to ask me ... I would say ..."

The following have present optative in the protasis, aorist optative in the apodosis:

εἰ γὰρ εἰδείης ὅσον ἀργύριον εἴργασμαι ἐγώ, θαυμάσαις ἄν. (Plato)
ei gàr eideíēs hóson argúrion eírgasmai egṓ, thaumásais án.
"if you knew how much money I have earned, you would be amazed."

ἡδέως ἂν λάβοιμι, εἰ διδοίη. (Xenophon)
hēdéōs àn láboimi, ei didoíē.
"I would gladly accept it, if he were offering it."

The following uses the present optative in the apodosis:

οὐκ ἂν θαυμάζοιμι.
ouk àn thaumázoimi.
"I wouldn't be surprised (if that were so)."

In post-classical Greek, the optative mood gradually fell out of use. In the New Testament the potential optative with ἄν (án) occurs, but rarely (e.g. Acts 8:31); εἰ (ei) with the optative also sometimes occurs (e.g. 2 Peter 3:14).

== General conditions ==
=== Present general conditions ===
A present general condition uses the same grammatical construction (ἐάν with the subjunctive) as a vivid future condition, but is much less common. The present subjunctive is used when the actions of the two clauses are contemporaneous:

γελᾷ ὁ μῶρος, κἄν τι μὴ γελοῖον ᾖ. (Menander)
gelâi ho môros, kán ti mḕ geloîon êi.
"the foolish person laughs, even if there is nothing funny."

The following has the aorist subjunctive, indicating that the first action precedes the second:

ἢν δʼ ἐγγὺς ἔλθῃ θάνατος, οὐδεὶς βούλεται θνῄσκειν. (Euripides)
ḕn dʼ engùs élthēi thánatos, oudeìs boúletai thnḗiskein.
"if ever death draws near, no one wishes to die."

The perfect subjunctive also refers to a situation existing at the time of the main verb, but as a result of something which happened earlier, as in the example below:

ἐάν τε ἑαλωκὼς ᾖ ἐάν τε μή, δηλούτω. (Xenophon)
eā́n te healōkṑs êi eā́n te mḗ, dēloútō.
"whether (the hare) has been caught or not, (the huntsman) should make it clear (to his colleagues)."

Occasionally, the verb in the apodosis is an aorist tense, but with the sense of a present. This is known as a "gnomic aorist":

ἢν δέ τις τούτων τι παραβαίνῃ, ζημίαν αὐτοῖς ἐπέθεσαν. (Xenophon)
ḕn dé tis toútōn ti parabaínēi, zēmían autoîs epéthesan.
"if a man transgress anyone one of these laws, they always impose a penalty on him."

=== Past general conditions ===
The optative mood can similarly be used after εἰ (ei) "if" in general clauses of the type "if ever it used to happen". In the following examples the present optative is used in the protasis, and the imperfect indicative in the apodosis:

εἴ πού τι ὁρῴη βρωτόν, διεδίδου. (Xenophon)
eí poú ti horṓiē brōtón, diedídou.
"If ever he saw something edible anywhere, he would pass it round."

καὶ πάνυ ἄκρατος ἦν, εἰ μή τις ὕδωρ ἐπιχέοι. (Xenophon)
kaì pánu ákratos ên, ei mḗ tis húdōr epikhéoi.
"and (the barley-wine) was completely undiluted, unless someone added water."

In the following, however, the aorist optative is used in the protasis, to indicate that the action of sharing had to come before that of being allowed near the fire:

οὐ προσίεσαν πρὸς τὸ πῦρ τοὺς ὀψίζοντας, εἰ μὴ μεταδοῖεν αὐτοῖς πῡρούς. (Xenophon)
ou prosíesan pròs tò pûr toùs opsízontas, ei mḕ metadoîen autoîs pūroús.
"they wouldn't let the late-comers come near the fire, unless they first shared some wheat with them."

In the following example, as often happens, the protasis is reduced simply to εἰ δὲ μή (ei dè mḗ) "otherwise". Here εἰ δὲ μή stands for "but if they didn't hold their weapons above the water":

καὶ οὔτʼ ἐν τῷ ὕδατι τὰ ὅπλα ἦν ἔχειν· εἰ δὲ μή, ἥρπαζεν ὁ ποταμός. (Xenophon)
kaì oútʼ en tôi húdati tà hópla ên ékhein; ei dè mḗ, hḗrpazen ho potamós.
"and it was not possible to hold their weapons in the water, otherwise the river kept snatching them away."

Sometimes in the apodosis of a past general condition, the particle ἄν án is added to an imperfect or aorist indicative tense to express repeated past action. This is called the "iterative imperfect or aorist". The following example has the imperfect indicative with ἄν án:

εἰ δέ τις αὐτῷ περί του ἀντιλέγοι ... ἐπὶ τὴν ὑπόθεσιν ἐπανῆγεν ἂν πάντα τὸν λόγον. (Xenophon)
ei dé tis autôi perí tou antilégoi ... epì tḕn hupóthesin epanêgen àn pánta tòn lógon.
"if ever anyone opposed him on anything ... he would bring the whole subject back to the beginning"

The following uses the aorist indicative with ἄν án:

καὶ εἴ τις αὐτῷ δοκοίη ... βλακεύειν, ἐκλεγόμενος τὸν ἐπιτήδειον ἔπαισεν ἄν. (Xenophon)
kaì eí tis autôi dokoíē ... blakeúein, eklegómenos tòn epitḗdeion épaisen án.
'if ever anyone seemed to him to be lagging behind, he would pick out the culprit and would beat him.'

== Unreal conditions ==
=== Present unreal conditions ===
Unreal (counterfactual) conditions referring to present time are made with εἰ (ei) followed by the imperfect indicative in the protasis, and the imperfect indicative combined with the particle ἄν (án) in the apodosis:

ταῦτα δὲ οὐκ ἂν ἐδύναντο ποιεῖν, εἰ μὴ διαίτῃ μετρίᾳ ἐχρῶντο. (Xenophon)
taûta dè ouk àn edúnanto poieîn, ei mḕ diaítēi metríāi ekhrônto.
"they wouldn't be able to do this if they weren't following a temperate diet."

εἰ ἀληθῆ ἦν ταῦτα ..., ἐμοὶ ἂν ὠργίζεσθε (Andocides)
ei alēthê ên taûta ..., emoì àn ōrgízesthe
"if these things were true, you would be getting angry with me"

=== Past unreal conditions ===
In unreal (counterfactual) past conditions, the aorist indicative is used in both the protasis and the apodosis. To give the meaning "would", the particle ἄν (án) is added in the apodosis only:

οὐκ ἂν ἐποίησεν ταῦτα, εἰ μὴ ἐγὼ αὐτὸν ἐκέλευσα. (Xenophon)
ouk àn epoíēsen taûta, ei mḕ egṑ autòn ekéleusa.
"he would not have done this, if I had not ordered him."

The following example has an apodosis only with no protasis. The tense is aorist indicative:

τίς γὰρ ἂν ᾠήθη ταῦτα γενέσθαι; (Demosthenes)
tís gàr àn ōiḗthē taûta genésthai?
"for who would have expected these things to happen?"

An imperfect tense in an unreal condition can refer to the past as well as the present, as in the following, where the verb ἠπιστάμην (ēpistámēn) is imperfect indicative. The verb in the apodosis, συνηκολούθησά (sunēkoloúthēsá), is aorist indicative:

εἰ μὲν πρόσθεν ἠπιστάμην, οὐδʼ ἂν συνηκολούθησά σοι. (Xenophon)
ei mèn prósthen ēpistámēn, oudʼ àn sunēkoloúthēsá soi.
"if I had understood before, I would not have followed you."

In the following, the first imperfect refers to the past, the second to the present time:

εἰ μὴ τότʼ ἐπόνουν, νῦν ἂν οὐκ εὐφραινόμην. (Philemon)
ei mḕ tót epónoun, nûn àn ouk euphrainómēn.
"if I had not been toiling then, I would not now be rejoicing."

The particle ἄν (án) is occasionally omitted from an unreal condition, especially if the apodosis contains an imperfect tense verb of obligation or possibility, such as ἐξῆν (exên) "it was possible":

ἐμὲ δʼ ἐξῆν αὐτῷ, εἰ ἐσωφρόνει, μὴ συκοφαντεῖν. (Aeschines)
emè dʼ exên autôi, ei esōphrónei, mḕ sukophanteîn.
"it would have been possible for him, if he had been wise, not to accuse me falsely."

However, in other examples, where the emphasis is on the possibility or the necessity rather than the dependent infinitive, ἄν (án) is added. In the following example, ἐξεγένετο (exegéneto) is the aorist tense corresponding to the imperfect ἐξῆν (exên):

περὶ ἐμοῦ μὲν γὰρ εἰ ἔλεγον ἃ οὗτος ἐβούλετο, οὐδʼ ἂν ἀπολογήσασθαί μοι ἐξεγένετο. (Lysias)
perì emoû mèn gàr ei élegon hà hoûtos eboúleto, oudʼ àn apologḗsasthaí moi exegéneto.
"if (the tortured slaves) were to say about me what he wanted them to say, it wouldn't have been possible for me to defend myself."

Some other expressions also lack ἄν (án), for example:

τούτῳ δʼ εἰ μὴ ὡμολόγουν, οὐδεμιᾷ ζημίᾳ ἔνοχος ἦν. (Lysias)
toútōi dʼ ei mḕ hōmológoun, oudemiâi zēmíāi énokhos ên.
"if (the tortured slaves) did not agree with him, he wouldn't have been liable to any penalty."

== If by chance ==
A vivid future conditional clause using ἐάν (eán) with the subjunctive can be used with the meaning "in the hope that", "in case by chance", or "to see if perhaps", "on the off chance that".

ἄκουσον καὶ ἐμοῦ, ἐάν σοι ἔτι ταὐτὰ δοκῇ. (Plato)
ákouson kaì emoû, eán soi éti tautà dokêi.
"listen to me too, in case the same things may still seem true to you."

In a historic context, this type of clause becomes a less vivid future, using εἰ (ei) or εἰ πως (ei pōs) "if by chance" with the optative mood. In the first example below, πείσειαν (peíseian) "they might persuade" is aorist optative:

πορευόμενοι ἐς τὴν Ἀσίαν ὡς βασιλέα, εἴ πως πείσειαν αὐτὸν χρήματά τε παρασχεῖν καὶ ξυμπολεμεῖν. (Thucydides)
poreuómenoi es tḕn Asían hōs basiléa, eí pōs peíseian autòn khrḗmatá te paraskheîn kaì xumpolemeîn.
"proceeding to Asia to the King, in the hope that they might persuade him to provide money and join the war."

ἔσπευδεν γὰρ εἰ δυνατὸν εἴη αὐτῷ τὴν ἡμέραν τῆς πεντηκοστῆς γενέσθαι εἰς Ἱεροσόλυμα. (Acts)
éspeuden gàr ei dunatòn eíē autôi tḕn hēméran tês pentēkostês genésthai eis Hierosóluma.
"for he was hurrying, in case it might be possible for him to reach Jerusalem by the day of Pentecost."

== Wishes ==
Wishes in Greek use tenses from the historic sequence: optative, imperfect indicative, and aorist indicative, depending on whether they refer to the future, present or past.

=== Wishes for the future ===
The optative mood alone can be used to express wishes for the future:

ὃ μὴ γένοιτο. (Demosthenes)
hò mḕ génoito.
"which may it not happen!"

The optative of wish is sometimes preceded by εἴθε (eíthe) or εἰ γάρ (ei gár) "if only". In this case it has the same construction as a less vivid future condition:

εἰ γὰρ γένοιτο. (Xenophon)
ei gàr génoito.
"if only it might happen!"

=== Wishes for the present and past ===
An unattainable wish about the present or past is expressed using the imperfect or aorist indicative, preceded by εἴθε (eíthe) or εἰ γάρ (ei gár), that is, with the same construction as for an unreal present or past condition. The imperfect indicative is used for present time:

εἴθʼ εἶχες, ὦ τεκοῦσα, βελτίους φρένας. (Euripides)
eíthʼ eîkhes, ô tekoûsa, beltíous phrénas.
"if only, mother, you had a better heart!"

The aorist indicative is used for an unattainable wish referring to past time:

εἴθε σοι, ὦ Περίκλεις, τότε συνεγενόμην. (Xenophon)
eíthe soi, ô Períkleis, tóte sunegenómēn.
"if only I had been with you then, Pericles!"

Sometimes the aorist tense of the verb ὀφείλω (opheílō) "I owe" is added:

τὸ τριώβολον δῆτʼ ἔλαβες; – εἰ γὰρ ὤφελον. (Aristophanes)
tò triṓbolon dêtʼ élabes? – ei gàr ṓphelon.
"did you get the three-obol fee?" – "I wish I had!"

Hence in the well-known opening of Euripides' play Medea:

εἴθʼ ὤφελʼ Ἀργοῦς μὴ διαπτάσθαι σκάφος
Κόλχων ἐς αἶαν κυανέας Συμπληγάδας. (Euripides)
eíthʼ ṓphelʼ Argoûs mḕ diaptásthai skáphos
Kólkhōn es aîan kuanéas Sumplēgádas.
"if only the ship Argo had not flown through
the dark blue Clashing Rocks to the land of the Colchians!"

== Conditional relative clauses ==
A common idiom in Ancient Greek is for the protasis of a conditional clause to be replaced by a relative clause. (For example, "whoever saw it would be amazed" = "if anyone saw it, they would be amazed.") Such sentences are known as "conditional relative clauses", and they follow the same grammar as ordinary conditionals. Such relative clauses are always indefinite, for example:

ὅστις ζῆν ἐπιθυμεῖ, πειράσθω νικᾶν. (Xenophon)
hóstis zên epithumeî, peirásthō nikân.
"whoever wishes to survive, let him try to conquer."

οἱ παῖδες ὑμῶν, ὅσοι ἐνθάδε ἦσαν, ὑπὸ τούτων ἂν ὑβρίζοντο. (Lysias)
hoi paîdes humôn, hósoi entháde êsan, hupò toútōn àn hubrízonto.
"your children, as many as were here (i.e. if any had been here), would have been abused by these men."

== Conditional clauses in indirect speech ==
=== Indirect statements ===
The main verbs in indirect statements are commonly changed to the infinitive, except when the quoted sentence is introduced by ὅτι (hóti) or ὡς (hōs). Subordinate clause verbs, and main verbs after ὅτι (hóti) or ὡς (hōs), may optionally be changed to the optative mood, but only when the context is historic. In some circumstances a verb is changed to a participle, and sometimes a present indicative becomes imperfect tense.

In indirect conditional clauses, in a historic context, ἐάν + subjunctive may optionally be changed to εἰ + optative. However, an imperfect or aorist indicative in the protasis of an unreal conditional sentence is not changed to the optative. In the apodosis of an ideal or unreal conditional, ἄν is retained when the verb is changed to an infinitive or participle.

The following table shows how the tenses of an original statement are changed to different tenses of the infinitive, participle, and optative when the speech is made indirect:

Original speech	Infinitive	Participle	Optative	Past
Present or imperfect	Present	Present	Present	Imperfect
Future indicative	Future	Future	Future	
Aorist indicative	Aorist	Aorist	Aorist	
Perfect or pluperfect	Perfect	Perfect	Perfect	Pluperfect

==== Indirect statements with the infinitive ====
In the four examples of indirect statement below, all the main verbs of the original speech have been changed to an infinitive.

The first example is an indirect present tense open conditional. The present infinitive ἐλευθεροῦν (eleutheroûn) represents a present indicative (ἐλευθεροῖς eleutheroîs "you are freeing") in the original speech. The present indicative verb of the protasis ("you are killing") is changed to the imperfect indicative, as if the writer were stating a fact rather than quoting a speech:

ἔλεγον οὐ καλῶς τὴν Ἑλλάδα ἐλευθεροῦν αὐτόν, εἰ ἄνδρας διέφθειρεν. (Thucydides)
élegon ou kalôs tḕn Helláda eleutheroûn autón, ei ándras diéphtheiren.
"they said that he was not freeing Greece in a good way, if he was killing men."

The following example is an indirect emotional future conditional. The two main verbs ("there is" and "it will be") have been changed to the present and future infinitive respectively. The future indicative in the protasis ("will capture in advance") has been changed into the future optative mood:

ἔφη εἶναι ἄκρον ὃ εἰ μή τις προκαταλήψοιτο, ἀδύνατον ἔσεσθαι παρελθεῖν. (Xenophon)
éphē eînai ákron hò ei mḗ tis prokatalḗpsoito, adúnaton ésesthai pareltheîn.
"he said that there was a hill-top which, unless someone captured it first, it was going to be impossible to get past."

The following is an unreal past conditional. The verb in the protasis, which would have been an imperfect indicative in the original speech, has been changed to a present participle using the genitive absolute construction. The aorist tense main verb has been changed into the aorist infinitive; the particle ἄν (án) is retained, but has been placed after the participle:

λέγοντος ἄν τινος πιστεῦσαι οἴεσθε; (Demosthenes)
légontos án tinos pisteûsai oíesthe?
"do you think that, if someone had told them, they would have believed it?" (εἴ τις ἔλεγεν, ἐπίστευσαν ἄν;)

The following is a vivid future conditional in a historic context. The main verb "I will not stop" is changed into the future infinitive. ἐάν (eán) "if" and πρὶν ἄν (prìn án) "before" with the aorist subjunctive have been changed into εἰ (ei) and πρίν (prín) with the aorist optative. The verb in the relative clause (στρατεὐομαι strateúomai "I am campaigning") is changed from present to imperfect indicative:

ὑποσχόμενος αὐτοῖς, εἰ καλῶς καταπράξειεν ἐφʼ ἃ ἐστρατεύετο, μὴ πρόσθεν παύσεσθαι πρὶν αὐτοὺς καταγάγοι οἴκαδε. (Xenophon)
huposkhómenos autoîs, ei kalôs katapráxeien ephʼ hà estrateúeto, mḕ prósthen paúsesthai prìn autoùs katagágoi oíkade.
"promising them that if he accomplished what he was campaigning for, he would not stop until he brought them back home." (εἰ καλῶς καταπράξομαι ἐφʼ ἅ στρατεὐομαι, οὐ πρόσθεν παύσομαι πρὶν ἂν ὑμᾶς καταγάγω οἴκαδε.)

==== Indirect statements with ὅτι ====
Indirect statements can also be made in Greek using the conjunction ὅτι (hóti) "that". If the context is past, the verbs may optionally be changed to the optative mood.

In the following example, the main verb ἐπιθήσοιεν (epithḗsoien) has been changed to the future optative, but the future indicative in the protasis has not been changed to the optative:

ἠπείλουν αὐτῷ ὅτι εἰ λήψονται ἀποδιδράσκοντα, τὴν δίκην ἐπιθήσοιεν. (Xenophon)
ēpeíloun autôi hóti ei lḗpsontai apodidráskonta, tḕn díkēn epithḗsoien.
"they threatened him that if they caught (lit. will catch) him running away, they would punish him."

However, in unreal conditional clauses, the indicative always remains and there is no change to the optative:

ἀπελογοῦντο ὡς οὐκ ἄν ποτε οὕτω μῶροι ἦσαν εἰ εἴδεσαν. (Xenophon)
apelogoûnto hōs ouk án pote hoútō môroi êsan ei eídesan.
"they pleaded that they would never have been so foolish if they had known."

=== Indirect questions ===
An indirect question is often introduced by εἰ (ei) "if", even though the original question does not contain a conditional clause. In a historic context, the main verb may be changed to the optative mood, as in the first example below. In this example, the 2nd person present indicative βούλει; (boúlei?) "are you willing?" has been changed to the 3rd person present optative. The aorist participle λαβών (labṓn) "having received" possibly stands for a vivid future ("if you receive") or less vivid future protasis ("if you were to receive"):

ἐγὼ δὲ Πείσωνα μὲν ἠρώτων εἰ βούλοιτό με σῶσαι χρήματα λαβών. (Lysias)
egṑ dè Peísōna mèn ērṓtōn ei boúloitó me sôsai khrḗmata labṓn.
"I asked Pison if he was willing to save me if he received some money."

An optative mood does not change in indirect speech. The presence of ἄν (án) in the following sentence shows that the original question had a potential optative ("would you give?"):

ἠρώτων ἐκεῖνοι εἰ δοῖεν ἂν τούτων τὰ πιστά. (Xenophon)
ērṓtōn ekeînoi ei doîen àn toútōn tà pistá.
"they asked if (the Greeks) would give pledges concerning these matters."

=== Indirect commands ===
In indirect commands also, the verb is generally changed to an infinitive, as in the following example:

εἰ οὖν τι βούλονται σαφὲς λέγειν, πέμψαι ἄνδρας ὡς αὐτόν. (Thucydides)
ei oûn ti boúlontai saphès légein, pémpsai ándras hōs autón.
"(the letter said that) if therefore they wished to say something clearly, they should send some men to him."

In the above sentence, although the context is historic, the writer has chosen not to use the optative but the more vivid indicative mood with the verb βούλονται "they wish". This retention of the vivid mood is typical of Thucydides's style.

== Conditional clauses in Homer ==
There are some differences between Homeric conditionals and those in classical Greek. As well as εἰ (ei) "if", Homer also uses the Aeolic dialect form αἰ (ai). As well as the particle ἄν (án), Homer also uses κέ (ké) or κέν (kén). κέ(ν) (ké(n)) is more frequent than ἄν (án), especially in affirmative sentences.

In Homer, in the protasis of a vivid future conditional, εἰ (ei) can be used on its own with the subjunctive, without κέ (ké) or ἄν (án), and without any difference in meaning. In the following, the protasis has the aorist subjunctive, while the apodosis has the future indicative:

εἴ περ γάρ σε κατακτάνῃ, οὔ σε ... κλαύσομαι. (Iliad)
eí per gár se kataktánēi, oú se ... klaúsomai.
"for if he kills you, I will not weep for you."

Another construction not found in classical Greek is to use the subjunctive with κέ (ké) in both clauses. In the following, both verbs are aorist subjunctive:

εἰ δέ κε μὴ δώῃσιν, ἐγὼ δέ κεν αὐτὸς ἕλωμαι. (Iliad)
ei dé ke mḕ dṓēisin, egṑ dé ken autòs hélōmai.
"but if he does not give her up, I will seize her myself."

In present general conditions, κέ or ἄν are often absent from the protasis. In the following example, the verb καταπέψῃ (katapépsēi) is aorist subjunctive, while ἔχει (ékhei) "he keeps" is present indicative:

εἴ περ γάρ τε χόλον γε καὶ αὐτῆμαρ καταπέψῃ, ἀλλά τε καὶ μετόπισθεν ἔχει κότον, ὄφρα τελέσσῃ. (Iliad)
eí per gár te khólon ge kaì autêmar katapépsēi, allá te kaì metópisthen ékhei kóton, óphra teléssēi.
"for even if he swallows down his anger on that day, yet later he keeps a grudge, until he fulfils it."

In the less vivid future conditional, κέ or ἄν can be added after εἰ, with no difference in meaning. In the following, both verbs are aorist optative:

οὐ μὲν γάρ τι κακώτερον ἄλλο πάθοιμι, οὐδʼ εἴ κεν τοῦ πατρὸς ἀποφθιμένοιο πυθοίμην. (Iliad)
ou mèn gár ti kakṓteron állo páthoimi, oudʼ eí ken toû patròs apophthiménoio puthoímēn.
"for I could not suffer anything worse, not even if I found out that my father had died"

In Homer, the imperfect in unreal conditionals refers only to past time. In a present unreal conditional, the protasis may have the optative in both halves, although this is very rare. In a past unreal conditional the protasis has either an imperfect or an aorist indicative, and in the apodosis either an imperfect or aorist indicative with ἄν (án) or κέ (ké), or an aorist or present optative with κέ (ké). In the following example, νόησε is aorist indicative, and ἀπολοιτο is aorist optative:

καί νύ κεν ἔνθʼ ἀπόλοιτο ... Αἰνείας, εἰ μὴ ἄρʼ ὀξὺ νόησε ... Ἀφροδίτη (Iliad)
kaí nú ken énthʼ apóloito ... Aineías, ei mḕ árʼ oxù nóēse ... Aphrodítē
"and at this point Aeneas might have perished, if Aphrodite had not quickly observed him"

== See also ==
- Latin conditional clauses
- Conditional sentence
- Counterfactual conditional
